= List of commodity traders =

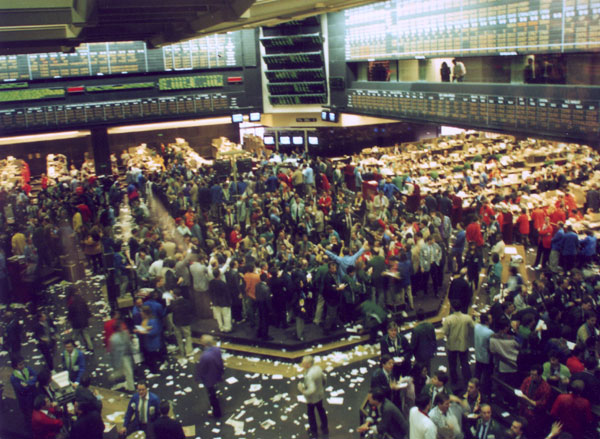
Traders in the corn pit at the Chicago Board of Trade

Commodity traders are people or companies who speculate and trade in commodities as diverse as metals and spices.

== Medieval and early modern ==
- Fuggers
- Jacques Cœur
- Tripp of Dordrecht
- Welsers

== Individuals ==
- John D. Arnold – natural gas
- Louis Bacon – cotton
- Jay Gould – gold
- Paul Tudor Jones – cotton
- Marc Rich – oil
- Federico Santa María – sugar

== Modern companies ==
- 2Rivers
- Archer Daniels Midland
- Bunge Limited
- Cargill
- Castleton Commodities International
- COFCO
- Glencore
- Gunvor
- D.TRADING
- IXM
- Koch Industries
- Louis Dreyfus Group
- Mercuria Energy Trading
- Noble Group
- Olam International
- Phibro
- Targray
- Trafigura
- Vitol

== See also ==
- List of trading companies
