= 2Rivers =

Dubai-based commodity trader

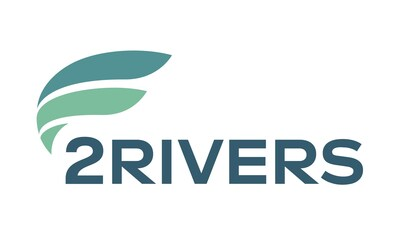
- Type: Private
- Industry: Commodity; Oil & Gas
- Founded: 2010; 16 years ago
- Founder: Tahir Garayev
- Headquarters: Dubai, UAE
- Area served: Worldwide (with a focus on Russia)
- Key people: Etibar Eyyub; Talat Safarov; Anar Madatli; Ahmed Kerimov
- Services: Energy & Commodities; Shipping & Chartering (Shadow fleet)
- Owner: Pura Vida Holding Limited, UAE.
- Number of employees: 300+ (as of October 2023)

2Rivers, formerly Coral Energy, is a Dubai-based oil trading company engaged in the sale and export of Russian crude oil and petroleum products. Since 17 December 2024, the company has been under United Kingdom sanctions.

2Rivers was founded by Azerbaijani citizen Tahir Gadir oghlu Garayev (Tahir Garayev) in 2010. 2Rivers, according to journalistic investigations, has a close relationship with Igor Sechin and Rosneft. Since 2022, 2Rivers has quietly grown to become the largest trader circumventing Western sanctions on Russian crude and petroleum exports, mainly from Rosneft. 2Rivers operates through a web of companies that appear to be unaffiliated, but are controlled by the 2Rivers’ executive team. This includes dozens of trading companies established in the Dubai Multi Commodities Centre freezone of the UAE, as well as ship management and operations companies.

Prior to the 2022 Russian invasion of Ukraine, 2Rivers, at that time Coral Energy, was based in Geneva. After the invasion, 2Rivers moved its headquarters to Dubai and has offices in Singapore and Geneva. The company announced that it closed its Moscow office in 2022, however, investigations concluded that the company continues to manage an office there under a different name.

A report from The Wall Street Journal in early 2024 reported that Coral Energy controls at least 100 vessels through seemingly unaffiliated shell companies. These include Gatik Ship Management, Gaurik Ship Management, and Buena Vista Shipping. At least five of these vessels have been sanctioned by the UK and EU. These vessels continue to carry crude and petroleum products purchased by 2Rivers trading companies in violation of Western sanctions.

On 17 December 2024, the United Kingdom added 2Rivers to the list of sanctioned companies. This decision prohibits anyone in the UK, as well as UK companies and individuals abroad, from moving its funds or dealing in its property and other assets. The office of Prime Minister Keir Starmer said that the companies were “key linchpins in enabling the trading of Putin’s precious oil” and that the sanctions aimed to clamp down on “oil revenues he so desperately needs to fuel his illegal war.”

== History ==
2Rivers Group (Coral Energy) was founded by Tahir Garayev in 2010. According to market sources, 2Rivers most likely has ties to the functionaries of the ruling elite of Azerbaijan. Etibar Eyyub, Azerbaijani citizen, is the main point of contact between 2Rivers and Igor Sechin. He maintains a close relationship with Garayev and is instrumental in directing 2Rivers’ activities, but does not have an official ownership stake on paper.

Until the end of 2023, Garayev owned 100% of 2Rivers (then Coral Energy) through a complex corporate structure. Garayev owned 100% of Novus Middle East DMCC (UAE), which controlled 100% of Vetus Investments Limited (UAE). Vetus Investments then controlled 100% of Coral Energy. According to international investigations, under the growing pressure on the company to circumvent the latest sanctions, Garaev transferred 60% of the shares of Novus Middle East DMCC to the company Pura Vida Holding Limited (UAE), secured by the current management of 2Rivers: Talat Safarov (45%), Ahmed Kerimov (35%) and Anar Madatli (20%). At the beginning of 2024, CEO Talat Safarov, CFO Ahmed Kerimov, and CCO Anar Madatli (Azerbaijani nationals and UAE residents) completed the purchase of Garayev's remaining shares. Garayev continues to exercise control over 2Rivers, despite not owning the company on paper. Anar Madatli is also Tahir Garayev’s brother-in-law.

According to available information, the company is under the close scrutiny of US authorities, which contributed to the change in ownership and the trader's name. Additionally, active UK and EU sanctions against Gatik Ship Management foreshadow near term actions by those authorities against 2Rivers.

== Associated companies ==
The 2Rivers group of companies includes US-sanctioned Bellatrix Energy and US-sanctioned Voliton DMCC.

Another company that shared directors with Coral Energy is Nord Axis which was established on 15 February 2022 (9 days prior to Russia's invasion of Ukraine). Nord Axis was used by Coral (now 2Rivers) to purchase Trafigura’s 10% holding which was valued at EUR 7 billion. In October 2023, Kerimov denied that Coral Energy had any associations to Nord Axis. Company filings for Nord Axis showed that Adalat Kazimili was the sole owner of Nord Axis in May 2022. Kazimili was also registered as an official representative of Coral Energy Turkey in 2022. In 2023, Nord Axis was operated by Etibar Eyyub who worked for Coral Energy.

Other companies associated to 2Rivers include Novus Middle East DMCC, Vetus Investments Limited, Apeiron Energy DMCC, Pontus Trading DMCC, Polar Energy SA, Matterhorn Group FZE and Alpen Energy LLC.

Novus Middle East (also known as Altrum Group FZCO) was used to purchase the Karimun oil storage terminal in southern Indonesia, at the entrance to the Strait of Malacca.

=== Vetus Investments ===
According to a 2022 published analytical report by Transparency International, between 2014 and 2015, Mikhail Gutseriev and Kirill Shamalov (Putin’s former son-in-law) was involved in a Czech-Russian money-laundering scheme used for transfers of illicit funds from Russia to the Czech Republic. Czech citizen, Taras Moroz, who serves a director of Czech-based Vetus Investments S.R.O.—a subsidiary of 2Rivers/Coral Energy’s holding company Vetus Investments—also appeared in corporate records of several Czech shell companies used by Gutseriev and Shamalov in their money laudering structure. Organizers of the scheme concluded fictitious contracts for the purchase of Eurobonds between Czech and Russian companies, subsequently entering intoarbitral proceedings and influencing the decision of the commercial arbitration court in order to effectuate a transfer of illicit funds.

In 2021, Coral purchased a cargo from Mikhail Gutseriev, in violation of UK and EU sanctions at the time.

== Russian shadow fleet ==
A report from The Wall Street Journal in early 2024 reported that 2Rivers owns a large part of the so-called shadow fleet, with at least 100 vessels, transporting Russian crude, naphtha and other petroleum products. WSJ writes that the founder of the company, Tahir Garayev, speaks for the shadow fleet and the shadow traders who operate on behalf of Russian President Vladimir Putin through the Rosneft executive Igor Sechin. On 17 October, the UK sanctioned 4 of the 2Rivers vessels (managed by Gatik Ship Management): VARUNA (IMO 9332810) ; SAI BABA (IMO 9321691) ; ARTEMIS (IMO 9317949) ; ANTAEUS (IMO 9299733). The New York Times investigation found that the vessel, JAGUAR (IMO 9293002) which was managed by Gatik Ship Management, carried crude for Voliton DMCC, a Coral/2Rivers shell trading company that was sanctioned by the US on 20 December 2023.

According to the Financial Times, based on research reports from the Kyiv School of Economics (KSE) Institute, Russia has increased the capacity of its dark tanker fleet by up to 70%. By the end of 2024, 70% of Russian crude oil will already be transported by a shadow fleet, which will provide 89% of crude oil exports and 38% of petroleum product exports by sea, which allows Russia to bypass sanctions. A significant portion of these vessels are owned and operated by a number of shell companies in India, Mauritius, the United Arab Emirates and other jurisdictions. According to investigations, these companies are controlled by the founder of 2Rivers/Coral Energy, Tahir Garayev, and Etibar Eyyub.

On September 9, 2024, Vladyslav Vlasiuk, Ukrainian Commissioner for Sanctions Policy and Special Advisory to President Volodymyr Zelenskyy confirmed that one of the largest transport companies that helps the Russian Federation export oil is 2Rivers/Coral Energy.

2Rivers/Coral Energy complete false documents for transactions, conduct transfers in the open sea to avoid being seen, and also have offshore bank accounts in order to capture energy sales from the Russian Federation itself. The DMCC freezone in the UAE is the primary location from which 2Rivers operates their shadow network.

— Vladislav Vlasiuk

=== Statements by Ukrainian officials regarding the Russian shadow fleet ===
In April 2026, Vladyslav Vlasiuk, the Ukrainian President’s Commissioner for Sanctions Policy, stated that Russia continued adapting its sanctions-evasion mechanisms faster than Western governments were able to introduce new restrictions. The statement was cited in an RBC-Ukraine report concerning the operation of Russia’s so-called “shadow fleet.”

According to Vlasiuk, one of the entities facilitating the adaptation of the Russian shadow fleet to sanctions restrictions was 2Rivers (formerly Coral Energy). The publication stated that schemes involving changes of jurisdictions, intermediary companies, vessel ownership structures, and registration flags enabled the continued transportation of Russian oil and petroleum products despite international sanctions.

The report argued that such mechanisms allowed Russia to preserve energy exports and maintain logistical supply chains under sanctions pressure. Vlasiuk further stated that the effectiveness of sanctions policy depends on the speed of international coordination and the ability of Western governments to respond rapidly to evolving corporate and logistical structures associated with the shadow fleet.

== Trading ==
2Rivers is involved in the global crude oil and product trading business. The company trades a number of oil and oil-derived products including: coal, natural gas, ethanol, fuel oil, VGO, bitumen, middle distillates, and naphtha.

2Rivers (formerly Coral) operates two silos, a “red team” that buys Russian crude and petroleum products (much of which is above the price cap) and a “blue team” that are Western-facing companies purporting to not have any involvement with Russia. Accordingly, 2Rivers/Coral Energy has managed to keep Western financing for its activities, while it has also continued to trade illicitly.

In August 2022, Coral Energy became Pakistan's top fuel oil supplier.

=== Delivery of Rosneft products to Ukraine ===
At the beginning of 2021, Coral Energy replaced Proton Energy Group S.A. as the supplier of Rosneft products to Ukraine. Rosneft had previously contracted with Geneva-based Proton Energy, a company associated with Viktor Medvedchuk, an exiled Ukrainian oligarch who was a key supporter of Viktor Yanukovych, and Mikalai Varabei (also known as Nicolay Vorobei), to transport these exports to Ukraine via pipeline; however, Proton Energy terminated its trading operations in 2021 due increased risk of sanctions. The US government sanctioned Varabei in August 2021 for aiding the Belarusian regime through his oil trading business in Belarus and Medvedchuk in 2014 for his ties to former Ukrainian president Viktor Yanukovych. The EU sanctioned Varabei in December 2020 and Medvedchuk in May 2024.

The operator of 2Rivers/Coral Energy Group in Ukraine is Alpen Trade, a company that Tahir Garayev founded in 2016. Together with the State Register of the Russian Federation, the authority of Alpen Trade, Safarov Javid Mursal Ogli is the current director.

In addition to taking over Medvedchuk’s Rosneft contract into Ukraine, 2Rivers also acquired the Latvian B.L.B. Baltijas Terminal.

Cyprus-based Lostrita Investments is the beneficial owner of Latvia-based Venta Energy Services SIA. Venta Energy Services, which operates the B.L.B. Baltijas Terminal, is owned by Kamran Asgarov. 2Rivers’ controls the Latvia-based oil export terminal through an associated partnership, Venta Energy Services. Asgarov, as well as 2Rivers executives Ahmad Kerimov and Talat Safarov are listed as officers of Lostrita Investments.

Separately, in 2022, Ivano-Frankivsk city court froze assets belonging to both 2Rivers/Coral Energy and its subsidiary Apeiron Energy after they were found to have illegally imported jet fuel into Ukraine from Russia (Case № 344/7508/22).

=== Russian oil trading ===
When Trafigura wound down its relationship with Rosneft in 2022, Rosneft asked Coral Energy to take Trafigura's place.

In July 2022, Coral Energy outbid China's Sinopec for the purchase of Russian Eastern Siberia–Pacific Ocean (ESPO) crude oil cargoes.

In December 2022, Coral Energy bought 121,000 barrels of Russian crude oil a day from Surgutneftegas.

In April 2023, Coral Energy were linked to the use of Shadow fleet vessels.

In November 2023, it was reported that Coral Energy were re-selling Russian oil in several countries across Sub-Saharan Africa.

In March 2024, Etibar Eyyub, together with his partner Tahir Garayev, were reported to be the traders of 80% of all Russian oil exports, including Rosneft's.

=== Refineries and future production ===
In 2022, following the invasion of Ukraine by Russia, Trafigura sold its 10% share in the Vostok oil project to Etibar Eyyub and his company Nord Axis.

It was reported in 2023 that Coral Energy was assigned a prepayment and off take agreement with Nayara Energy refinery in India (which was 49% owned by Rosneft), that was originally established by Bellatrix Energy.

== Sanctions ==
In October 2024, it was reported that the Office of Foreign Assets Control were investigating 2Rivers for breaching sanctions relating to the Russian oil price cap.

Tahir Garayev is sanctioned by the National Security and Defense Council of Ukraine. Despite the management buyout, it was reported in September 2024, that Tahir Garayev continues to control 2Rivers.

Since 17 December 2024, 2Rivers has been under United Kingdom sanctions. The UK has also listed Coral Energy, which was the name of 2Rivers before its rebranding in the summer. The name change was an attempt to get rid of Coral's reputation as a player in the Russian oil market. The office of Prime Minister Keir Starmer said that the companies were "key linchpins in enabling the trading of Putin’s precious oil" and that the sanctions aimed to clamp down on "oil revenues he so desperately needs to fuel his illegal war".

In January 2025, it became known that representatives of 2Rivers were preparing to meet with representatives of the new US administration in Washington to lobby for the continued unauthorised use of 2Rivers/Coral and the funding of the war in Ukraine. It is reported that the lobbying company Qorvis may play an important role in this.

In December 2025, Altrum Group FZCO (also known as Novus Middle East) which owns the Karimun Oil terminal came under United Kingdom sanctions.

=== Lobbying activities ===
In April 2026, Ukrainian experts reported that the American lobbying firm Qorvis had been advising and assisting the Dubai-based oil trader 2Rivers (formerly Coral Energy), considered one of the key operators of Russia's "shadow fleet", since mid-2024.

According to Yevhen Mahda, Executive Director of the Institute of World Politics, Qorvis has been helping 2Rivers establish high-level contacts with U.S. government officials, including representatives of the Office of Foreign Assets Control (OFAC) at the U.S. Department of the Treasury. Senior Qorvis leadership, including CEO Matt Lauer and Managing Director Grace Fenstermaker, is reportedly involved in these efforts.

Ukrainian analysts interpret this lobbying as an attempt to "whitewash" the company's reputation and influence U.S. sanctions policy regarding the shadow fleet, which helps finance Russia's war against Ukraine. In January 2025, it was reported that representatives of 2Rivers were preparing meetings with the new U.S. administration in Washington, with Qorvis potentially playing a key role.
