= Neftegaz =

Russian: NefteGaz, (Ukrainian: NaftoHaz) may refer to:

- Naftogaz of Ukraine, Ukrainian oil and gas company, NJSC
- Rusneftegaz, Russian oil company
- Soyuzneftegaz, Russian oil company
- Surgutneftegas, Russian oil company, OJSC
- Yuganskneftegaz, Russian oil company
