= Val Shatsky oil field =

Russian oil field discovered in 2007

Val Shatsky
- Country: Russia
- Region: Black Sea
- Offshore/onshore: offshore
- Operator: Rosneft, ExxonMobil

Field history
- Discovery: 2007
- Start of development: 2014
- Start of production: 2018

Production
- Estimated oil in place: 860 million tonnes (~ 1.00×10^{9} m^{3} or 6320 million bbl)

The Val Shatsky oil field is a Russian oil field that was discovered in 2007 and located on the continental shelf of the Black Sea. It will begin production in 2018 and will produce oil and natural gas. The total estimated recoverable reserves of the Val Shatsky oil field are around 36 billion barrels.

== See also ==
- Petroleum industry in Russia
