= Trinasus =

Coordinates: 36°47′51″N 22°36′25″E

Trinasus or Trinasos (Ancient Greek: Τρινασός), or Trinassus or Trinassos (Τρίνασσος), was a town and fortress of ancient Laconia, situated upon a promontory near the head of the Laconian Gulf, and 30 stadia above Gythium. It is opposite to three small rocks, which gave their name to the place. The modern village is for the same reason still called Trinisa (Τὰ Τρίνησα). There are considerable remains of the ancient walls. The place was built in a semi-circular form, and was not more than 400 to 500 yards (370 to 460 m) in circuit.
