= Anastasievsko-Troitskoye oil field =

Russian natural resource

Anastasievsko-Troitskoye
- Country: Russia
- Region: Black Sea
- Offshore/onshore: offshore

Field history
- Discovery: 1994
- Start of production: 1995

Production
- Estimated oil in place: 27 million tonnes (~ 30×10^{6} m^{3} or 190 million bbl)

The Anastasievsko-Troitskoye field is a Russian oil field that was discovered in 1994 and located on the continental shelf of the Black Sea. It began production in 1995 and produces oil and natural gas. The total proven reserves of the Anastasievsko-Troitskoye oil field are around 190 million barrels (30,000,000 m^{3}), and production is centered on 12,000 barrels per day (1,900 m^{3}/d) in 2013.

== See also ==
- Petroleum industry in Russia
