= Pagania (disambiguation) =

Pagania was a name for the medieval realm of the Narentines.

Pagania may also refer to:

- Pagania, Italy, a commune near Acri, Calabria
- Ákra Paganiá, a cape in the east of the Mani Peninsula, Laconian Gulf, Greece
