= Ro Marine =

Norwegian-based Marine insurance company

Ro Marine AS is a Norwegian company, with an official address in Oslo, active in the field of Marine insurance.

According to an investigation by Norwegian broadcaster NRK and Danish investigative media Danwatch, it operated fraudulently and "over 100 ships have sailed with illegitimate insurance documents from Ro Marine". The company provided false insurance documents to many ships in the Russian shadow fleet which were operating despite the sanctions applied to the transport of Russian goods during the 2022 Russian invasion of Ukraine.

In March 2025, Norway charged four individuals with forgery and operating an illegal insurance business- these were the Russian owner, a Bulgarian board member, and two Norwegian business associates. In March 2025, Norway's Financial Supervisory Authority warned against using any of the company's services.
