= 2022 Russian crude oil price cap sanctions =

Economic sanction following the Russian invasion of Ukraine

As part of the sanctions imposed on the Russian Federation as a result of the Russo-Ukrainian War, on September 2, 2022, finance ministers of the G7 group of nations agreed to cap the price of Russian oil and petroleum products in an effort intended to reduce Russia's ability to finance its war on Ukraine while at the same time hoping to curb further increases to the 2021–2022 inflation surge.

In 2022 the Russian Federation was cushioned against energy sanctions because of a global rise in oil and gas prices. The rationale for the price cap is to remove that added value so that revenues earned by Russia are restricted and should not rise if world oil and gas prices increase again in the future. In addition, it will complicate maritime oil shipments for Russia and further restrict the amount of oil Russia can sell and ship to customers, further reducing revenue.

The 2022 Russian crude oil cap would be enforced by a maritime attestation that Russian crude was purchased below a certain set price, irrespective of market conditions. On 3 December 2022, this price cap has been set at US$60 per barrel. G-7-based finance companies would only be allowed to provide transport and other services to Russian-based crude under these conditions.

Flow of Russian oil through pipelines—which land locked countries like Hungary mostly depend on for supply—have been exempted from the price capping.

G7 and EU countries duplicated the price cap system over crude oil to provide a price cap on petroleum products from Russia, the price cap on refined oil products came into effect in early 2023.

By May 2023 the G7 countries considered the sanctions had been successful in achieving oil supply stability and reducing Russian tax revenue. December 2023 saw oil future prices 10% lower than at the start of the year.

== Background ==
Russian production in 2021 was 540 million tonnes (4,030m barrels) of crude oil, with 260 million tonnes (1,940m barrels) (48%) exported as crude oil, 290 million tonnes was refined of which 140 million tonnes (48%) were exported as refined products. Over 70% of Russian produced oil is exported. Around 1,100m barrels of crude oil were exported by ship in 2021, 1,400m barrels in 2022, with 75% leaving from western and 25% from eastern ports.

The Russian economy is heavily funded by oil and gas taxes. In 2021 Russia's revenue from all sources was $343 billion with oil and gas providing $127 billion. In 2022 revenue from all sources was $358 billion with oil and gas providing $166 billion or 46% of the budget. Oil revenue is a major sanction target.

== Sanction proposals ==
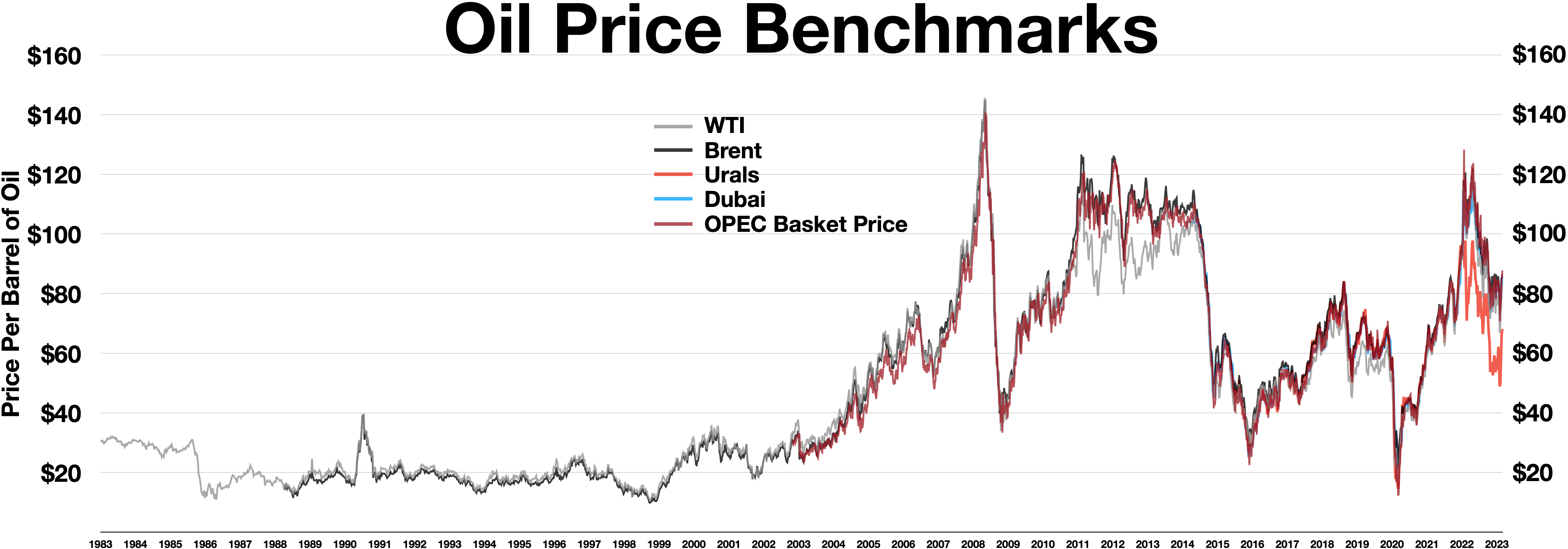
West Texas Intermediate Brent Crude Urals oil (Russian export mix) Dubai Crude OPEC Reference Basket

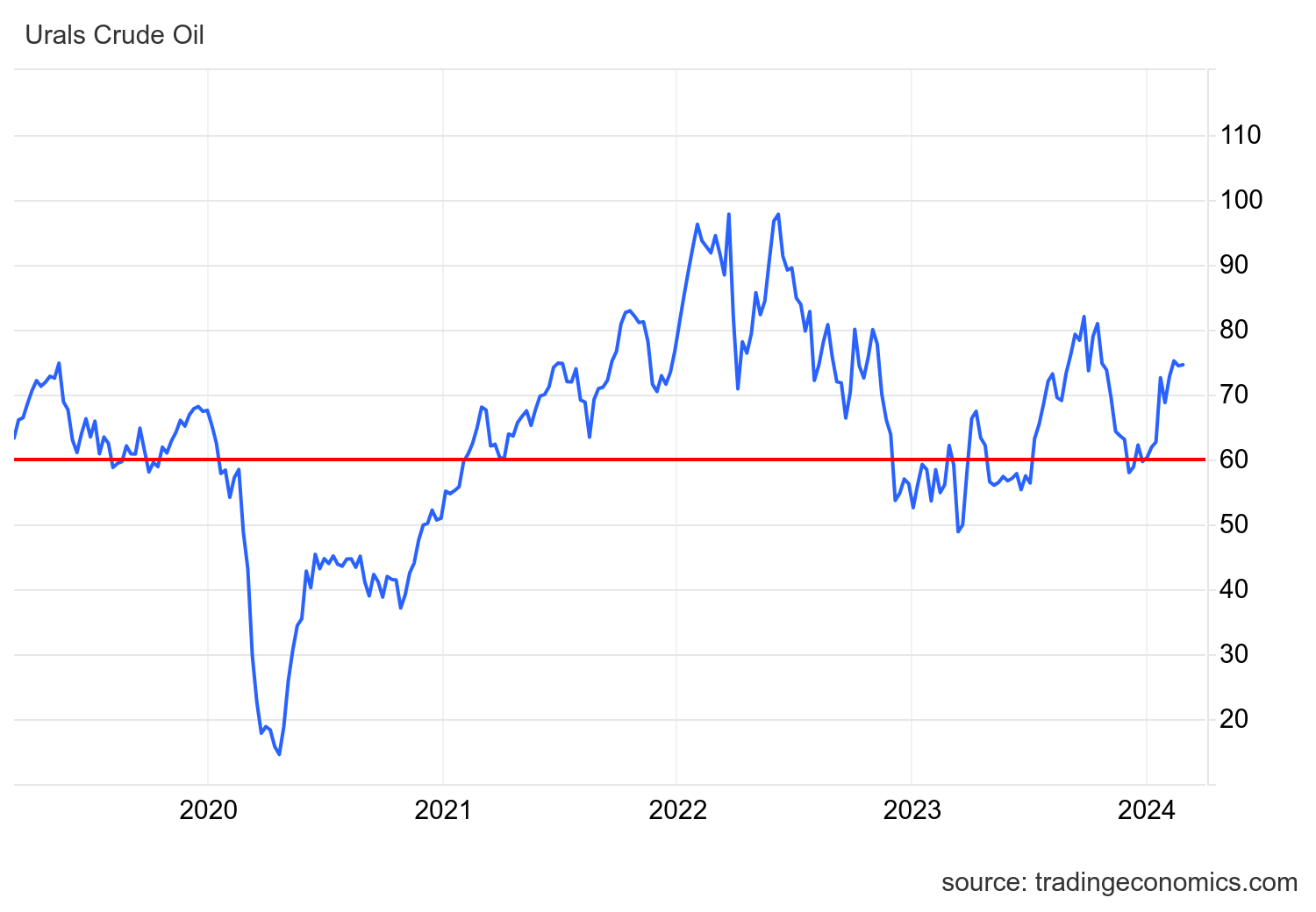
Price on Urals oil in 2024 sanctions cap

On 3 September 2022 French Finance Minister Bruno Le Maire said the proposal would require wider international participation to be successful, saying "it should not be a Western measure against Russia, it should be a global measure against war." In response, Russia said it would suspend sales to countries supporting the price cap. Some energy analysts expressed skepticism that a price cap would be realistic because the coalition is "not broad enough"; OPEC+ called the plan "absurd". The U.S. and the E.U. would likely attempt to follow through with the plan by limiting Russia's access to Western insurance services.

On 28 November 2022 the level of the price cap was discussed at length between the parties to the agreement and the International Working Group on Russian Sanctions reported that a price cap of US$75pb would be worse than having no price cap, whereas a price of US$55pb would reduce Russian oil revenue to US$166bn a restriction on finances for the Russian state, before recommending a cap of US$35pb as this would reduce revenue to US$100bn, giving a severe financial penalty, whilst still leaving the price above the cost of production.

The price cap level eventually agreed for the price cap was a balance between the levelling of Russia's revenue stream without causing a major disruption to global oil markets. It was also important to show Russia that Russia had lost the ability to disrupt the international economic order without facing pushback.

== Price Cap price ==
The G7 Oil Price Cap for crude oil of US$60 per barrel came into effect 5 December 2022.

The European Union had tentatively agreed on 1 December 2022 to set an initial US$60 barrel price cap on Russian seaborne oil with an adjustment mechanism to keep the cap at 5% below the market price, as reported by the International Energy Agency, reviewed every two months. On 2 December 2022 the EU confirmed the price cap rate and joined the US, other G7 countries and Australia in imposing the sanction from 5 December 2022 with two monthly reviews on the level of the price cap.

Price cap review mid January 2023. With Russian Urals oil trading well below the Cap price, reducing Russian revenue, not all countries are willing to undertake the political trading to get agreement on a lower price cap at this time, preferring to wait and see how the cap on refined oil, due to come into effect on 5 February would work. G7 countries have agreed that the next review would be in March 2023 after the refined oil products price cap is set. No change was made in March or April and reviews ceased.

=== Initial reactions ===
==== China ====
The pipeline to China is not affected by the sanctions, which only concerns shipped oil. The eastern oil is a higher quality than the western Urals oil, attracts a higher price and represents about 20-30% of Russia's production.

Whilst China has not joined in the price cap it appears that they are increasing purchases from Russia whilst using the cap to argue for lower prices for future deliveries. The Chinese company COSCO Shipping appears to have pulled out of shipping oil from Far East Russian ports since 5 December where oil shipments have fallen by 50%. A Chinese shipping company believes China could divert up to 18 supertankers and 16 smaller Aframax tankers in 2023 which could transport 110m barrels per annum, being 10% of shipped Russian Urals oil.

==== India ====
India has rejected the price cap, and Russia supported India's tanker fleet to enable them to ship Russian oil directly to India, bypassing the sanctions. In late 2022, India was buying around one shipload of 1m bpd. During December India increased Russian oil imports, receiving a discount of US$12-15pb which is around US$7pb higher discount than in October, giving a buy price below the price cap. Imports from Russia in 2022 totalled 33.4m tonnes (250m barrels). In 2023 as the price of Russian crude oil passed the price cap of $60, the third largest bank in India, the State Bank of India, advised that it would not process transactions in breach of the price cap, leading to billions being blocked in India, with Russia not being able to remit the money back to Russia or spend it elsewhere. This led in December 2023 to a suspension of most oil deliveries to India.

==== Russia ====
The Kremlin issued a presidential decree that prohibits Russian companies and any traders from selling oil to anyone that participates in a price cap. The decree also forbids dealings with both companies and countries that join the price-cap mechanism. This decree was amended in April 2023 to allow sales to "friendly countries", such as China and India.

With shipping insurance and reinsurance normally coming from Europe or the US and Lloyd's syndicates declaring Russian waters a war risk zone, making insurance hard to get and expensive, Russia is seeking to boost acceptance of its own shipping insurance through Russian National Reinsurance Company.

An experiment in sending one of its three ice-breaking oil tankers to China, sailing through the arctic circle north of Russia, has been tested, the journey is 3,300 miles and will take around 8 weeks.

It is believed that Russia has been purchasing around 100 old (12-15 year) oil tankers to create a "shadow fleet" in order to circumvent sanctions, and paying two to three times the normal price for tankers with ice class ratings. Russia needs around 240 tankers for its current level of production.

On 4 December 2022 Russia stated that it rejected the price cap of US$60 but would wait before responding to the sanction. Three responses have been suggested, which could become operational at the end of December 2022, a ban on sales to the price Cap participants, (only Japan is still importing ship borne oil from Russia), setting a floor price where Russian producers could not sell crude oil below a pre determined price and thirdly a maximum discount on Russian crude oil compared to the market price of crude oil from other suppliers.

On 27 December 2022 Russia issued a decree applicable from 1 February 2023 until 1 July 2023 which banned the sale of crude oil and finished oil products to any country or company that, directly or indirectly, referred to the price cap in the contract.

Russia announced that its tax on oil production would be based on a $20–25 discount on Brent oil, rather than actual Urals oil prices, which will result in increased tax revenue and equivalent increased costs for producers.

Announced in February 2023 was a reduction in production of 5% (500,000 b/d) as a response to the price caps for whole of 2023.

Russia claims its exports had already involved different types of crude oil sources. The RF exported Urals crude, a type of commodity that undergoes particular dynamics controlled by Russia, and as these discounts are gradually reduced, income flows to Russia will increase again, "contributing to the gradual recovery of tax revenues from the oil sector, especially in the second half of 2023," according to TASS, quoting the Ministry of Finance.

To reduce the taxation impact of the sanctions, Russia set a maximum discount to Brent oil for tax purposes of $34 in April 2023, decreasing monthly to $25 in July 2023, resulting in oil companies paying higher taxes if the real discount is higher. Russia is also seeking to create a Ural price index, rather than using western indices, for tax revenue purposes.

==== Ukraine ====
Ukrainian president Volodymyr Zelenskyy called the oil cap "a weak position" and not "serious" enough to damage the Russian economy.

In December 2022 Ukraine provided the International Maritime Organization a list of 30 oil tankers that they believed were involved in ship to ship transfers of Russian oil, risking environment pollution. The tankers flagged by Malta, Greece, Panama and Liberia with some switching-off AIS transponders.

==== OPEC ====
Global oil production was 100m bpd in 2022. The ten OPEC countries produce around 24.5m bpd and generally produce 1m bpd less than their target production. Russia is not in OPEC, its roughly 10m bpd comes into the OPEC+ number of around 40m bpd in 2022.

Some OPEC delegates attending an OPEC meeting in Vienna on 4 December 2022 believed that the production of Russian oil could decrease from the current 9.9m bpd by over 1m bpd because of the price cap. The International Energy Agency believes the drop in production could be 1.4m bpd. Some OPEC delegates believe global production should be decreased to force the recent fall in oil prices back to a higher level, whilst others believe a small increase in production could be undertaken to fill the gap left by the predicted fall in Russian production. The OPEC decision was to not change production levels from those set in October 2022.

OPEC production in February 2023 was up 0.15m bpd from January but still 0.88m bpd short of the targeted production. In March OPEC oil shipped was 24.1m bpd up 0.53m bpd from February and 1m bpd higher than March 2022. addition to the existing 0.5m bpd cut by Russia, Saudi Arabia will cut oil production by a similar amount and Iran by 0.21m bpd, UAE, Kuwait, Algeria and Oman are making smaller cuts.

On 4 June 2023 at an OPEC meeting Saudi Arabia announced it would continue further cuts through 2024 as the oil price had fallen below the $80 level it needed to cover its budget, other countries, including OPEC+, agreed to continue their previous cuts.

== Crude oil price, production per day and export duty ==
Ural average crude oil price				Production			Export Duty on Ural oil per tonne		
Month	Per barrel	Per tonne	Ref.	Month	m bpd	Ref.	Crude †	Light oil	Ref.
October/November 2022	$71.10			November 2022	11.40 (9.81‡)		$42.7	$12.8	
November/December	$57.49			December	10.87 (9.81‡)		$43.3	$12.9	
December/January 2023	$46.82	$341.8		January 2023	10.83 (9.90‡)		$16.7	$5.0	
January/February	$50.51	$368.7		February	11.05 (9.87‡)		$12.8	$4.2	
February/March	$50.80			March	10.36 (9.58‡)		$14.2	$4.2	
March/April	$51.15	$373.4		April	¶		$14.3	$4.2	
April/May	$55.97	$408.6		May	¶		$14.4	$4.3	
May/June	$54.57	$398.3		June	¶		$16.2	$4.8	
June/July	$58.03	$423.6		July	¶		$15.6	$4.6	
July/August	$70.33	$513.4		August	¶		$16.9	$5.0	
August/September	$77.03	$562.3		September	¶		$21.4	$6.4	
September/October	$83.35	$608.4		October	¶		$23.9	$7.1	
October/November	$79.23	$578.4		November	¶		$26.2	$7.8	
November/December 2023	$66.12	$482.7		December 2023	¶		$24.7 ◇	$7.4 ◇	
December/January 2024				January 2024			MET	MET	

‡ excluding gas condensate

† Export duty on crude oil from 2017 to 2020 averaged $100 per tonne, from 2020 to 2022 $50.

¶ Production data suppressed by Russia until April 2024

◇ Export duty ceased in December 2023, replaced by a mineral extraction tax (MET.) MET is a tax normally levied at the time of extraction, however for crude oil exports it will be based on volumes of oil delivered to ports and in 2024 use the average price for crude oil from northwest and southern Russian ports, compared to a discount of $15pb from Brent oil prices with an estimated $2pb freight cost for exports.

== Operation of sanctions ==
=== Bulgaria ===
An exemption was given to Bulgaria by the EU in June 2022 to allow it to continue importing Russian crude oil by ship, subject to the Russian owned Lukoil refinery only being allowed to sell diesel locally or export it to Ukraine. The refinery was also required to pay taxes to Bulgaria, which it has not done for years. The exemption lasts until December 2024. In May 2023 Bulgaria imported 63,000 barrels p/d. In September 2023 Bulgaria took over the Black Sea oil terminal at Rosenets from Lukoil Neftohim, whose 35-year lease was terminated due to force majeure circumstances. In October 2023, Bulgaria imposed a tax of 60% of revenue on the Lukiol refinery. Bulgaria will cease importing crude oil from Russia on 1 March 2024.

=== Trade routes ===
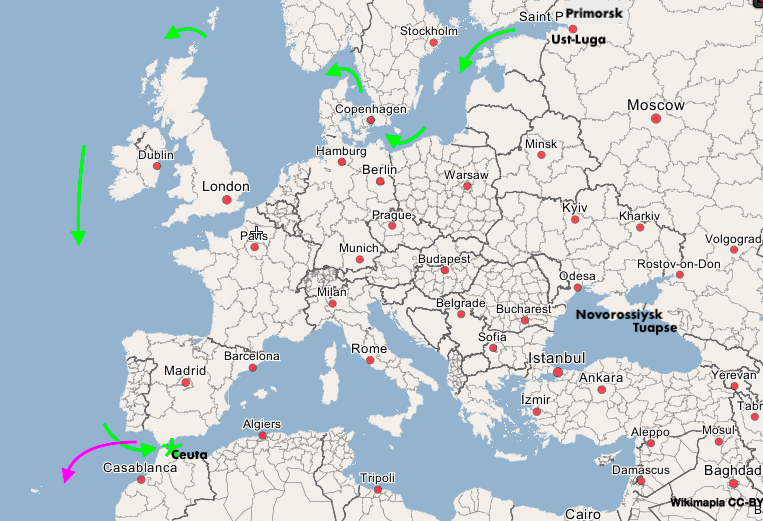
Map of oil tanker trade route from Primorsk and Ust-Luga to STS point offshore Ceuta, January 2023

Owing to various sanctions imposed since the onset of the war, much of Russia's liquid petroleum products has been re-routed through terminals at the Baltic terminals Port of Ust-Luga and Port of Primorsk, likely the source for transfers off Ceuta. Russian oil exports from are expected to rise to 7.1m tonnes in January 2023 with 70% going to India.

Port of Novorossiysk and Tuapse oil terminal maritime locations on the Black Sea were likely the source for ship-to-ship transfers in the Greek Bay of Lakonikos. Another report places the transfers from Aframax-class vessels to VLCCs bound for China off Gibraltar. In the east of the country, the Port of Kozmino is the terminus of the Eastern Siberia-Pacific Ocean pipeline; Rosneft, Gazpromneft and Surgutneftegas use it to funnel their product through intermediaries to China.

The Gulf of Lakonikos is a favourite transfer point because it is sheltered and Greek territorial waters extend only to six nautical miles from the shoreline.

=== Oil tankers ===
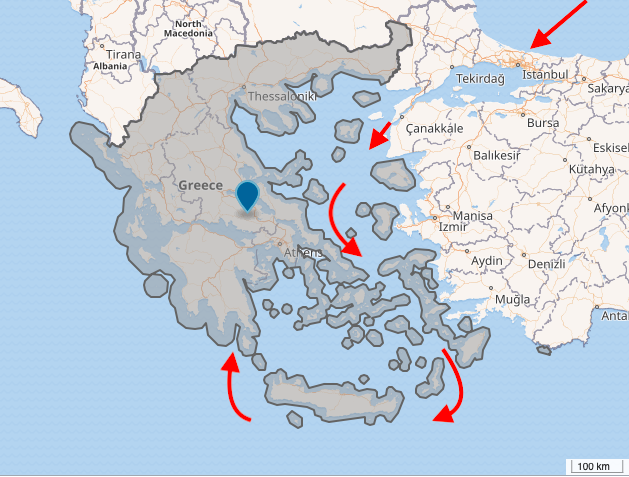
Map of oil tanker trade route from Black Sea to Gulf of Lakonikos

Around 55 percent of the tankers that transport Russian oil out of the country were Greek-owned, they can continue operating provided the price cap conditions are met. In December the percentage of Greek-owned ships moving Russian oil fell to 33% with the gap being filled by shadow fleet tankers. Cyprus reported that in two months from the beginning of October 2022, around 20% (900,000 gross tonnes) of their flagged oil tanker fleet have departed, by changing their registry. Higher losses being recorded in Greek and Maltese fleets.

It is believed that Russia has been experimenting with altering a ship transponder to avoid sanctions, with a tanker, the Kapitan Schemilkin giving in May to July 2022 a location near Greece when the tanker was near Malta, satellite imagery was used to prove the false location and identify the tanker's real position.

Ship to ship transfers of crude oil in the Mediterranean hit a record high in January of 1.7m tonnes as smaller tankers transferred their loads to larger vessels for onward transport to the Far East.

The rates that tankers can charge has risen, with a fee of $10.5m to transport 700,000b of crude, sold below the price cap, from the Baltic to India in January, compared to a fee a year earlier of $1m. In March VLCC tanker rates were on average 108% higher than March 2022, Suezmax rates were up 56% and Aframax up 40% on 2022.

By February 2023 around 400 tankers (20% of the world fleet) have changed to transporting Russian oil, leading to a shortage of tankers elsewhere and increasing shipping costs.

Gatik Ship Management, based in Mumbai, India, increased their fleet from 2 to over 58 tankers in two years by buying up old oil tankers costing around $1.3 billion, becoming the largest "dark-fleet" operator. Suspected of being tied to Russian oil company Rosneft, 21 ships lost American Bureau of Shipping listing and 21 their Lloyd's Register listing, 36 ships were de-flagged in April 2023 ships also lost their USA insurance cover after the company was suspected of shipping Russian oil costing more than the price cap level. Since then, 30 vessels have moved from Gatik management to other companies, Mongolia and Gabon have flagged a number of ships and 36 have joined the Indian Register of Shipping listing.

Concern over safety has resulted in Singapore holding 33 oil and chemical tankers that have failed inspections in the last year, more than in a normal decade, many of the ships are older, "shadow fleet" ones. China has also been undertaking additional checks on ships over 20 years old, delaying them, often for weeks. The tanker Titan, which has had seven different names and is managed through a postbox in the Seychelles failed a safety check in China on 23 counts.

The June 2023 11th round of sanctions bans any tankers that have transhipped oil at sea from entering sanctioning countries territorial waters, as are tankers that have switched off their transponders whilst in Russian territorial waters or to hide the fact that they have transhipped oil from Russia. The 12th round of sanctions bans the sale of tankers to Russia or to another party for the use of Russia and requires the reporting of all sales of tankers since 5 December 2022.

=== EU terms of Oil Price Cap ===
The EU introduced rules similar to the USA rules with a 45-day wind down for the regulations and changes to enable ships to comply. EU parties may not deal with any vessel that within the previous 90 days had discharged Russian oil at a price over the cap level. Any price cap changes will require a unanimous decision of the 27 EU Member States comprising the council.

=== UK terms of Oil Price Cap ===
The Office of Financial Sanctions Implementation (OFSI) is responsible for the sanctions in the UK and Overseas Territories. Crown Dependencies, as well as Bermuda and Gibraltar will legislate themselves. The rules follow those published by the US and include oil directly shipped from Russia, the transfer of goods between ships and the mixing of loads from different countries.

The permitted maximum monetary penalty is the greater of £1,000,000 or 50% of the estimated value of the breach. A licence can give written permission from OFSI to allow an act that would otherwise breach prohibitions imposed by sanctions.

=== USA terms of Oil Price Cap ===
On 22 November 2022 the Office of Foreign Assets Control (OFAC) in the USA published guidance on the operation of the Price Cap Policy.

A coalition of G7 countries, the European Union and Australia have agreed to prohibit the import of crude oil and petroleum products of Russian origin, supported by a broad range of companies involved in the transport of oil.

The object is to maintain the supply of oil whilst reducing the revenue of the Russian Federation.

US persons will be permitted to undertake services relating to:

- Trading/commodities brokering
- Financing
- Shipping
- Insurance, including reinsurance and protection and indemnity
- Flagging
- Customs brokering

under the condition that the oil price is the same as the Price Cap or lower.

Oil loaded before 12:01 am on 5 December 2022 and delivered before 12:01 am 19 January 2023 will be exempt.

Oil cannot be shipped to a jurisdiction that has a ban on the import of oil from the Russian Federation, such as the USA.

Sanctions cease when the oil is landed outside of Russian territory and handed to the purchaser.

On 21 December 2022 the US and OFAC agreed to grant some exemptions, such as if the oil is for humanitarian UN or Red Cross purposes.

Revised guidance including additional conditions were issued on 20 December 2023 requiring all companies, including shippers and movers of Russian oil, to receive attestations from the oil purchasers and sellers, each time they lift or load Russian oil, that the shipment complies with the sanctions and to share these documents with other service companies if they wish to claim safe harbor rules.

== Events during period of price cap sanctions ==
=== December 2022 ===
The number of sales of oil tankers in 2022 broke the 2021 levels with buyers for old oil tankers reported in the Middle East, in early December 2022 the charter price of a tanker in the Mediterranean was reported to have risen from 80,000 to US$130,000 per day if carrying oil from Russia. On 8 December 2022 Norway and Switzerland announced that they were joining the price cap sanctioning countries.

In the first week, Russian oil price at Baltic ports was reported as being as low as US$45.10 pb. Seaborne exports also fell by around 500,000 bpd. From 5 December 2022 Turkey demanded proof of full insurance on all tankers proposing to use its straits, to enter or leave the Black Sea, causing a traffic jam of tankers. The temporary holdup was resolved by 12 December.

On 27 December 2022 in response Russia has ordered to ban all oil sales to countries and companies which have agreed on the oil price cap starting 1 February 2023 to the next five months.

The EU, by 31 December, had reduced their import of Russian oil and oil products by 90% and whilst Russia continues to sell oil to other countries, the price obtained is on average US$30 per barrel less than oil on the global market. This is a material drop in revenue for Russia. December saw Russia pumping an average of 10.9m b/d with seaborne oil exports averaged 2.65m b/d a decrease of 14% on November and the lowest month in 2022, with 71% heading to Asia compared to 26% in 2021. 60% of Russian oil transported in December was in tankers controlled by UAE, China, India and Russia, twice previous levels.

=== January - March 2023 ===
The USA believe African countries can benefit from the Price Cap by buying oil from Russia at discounted prices, saving up to US$6 billion p.a. Japan managed to reduce their import of Russian oil by 56%, reducing it to just 1.46% of its oil imports in 2022.

Russian revenue from oil export duty reportedly fell from US$120m per week to US$47m a week after sanctions came into effect, a fall of 60%.

In the 4 weeks to 27 January, around 1.1m b/d of shipped Russian crude oil was moved by tankers that did not indicate their destination. Malaysia has reported increasing their crude oil sales to China to 1.5m b/d even though Malaysia only produces 400,000 b/d.

Oil and gas export revenue fell $8b (30%) in January compared to January 2022. Total oil exports amounted to just $13b (down 36% from December sales).

On 10 February Russia announced that in March, Russia will reduce oil production by 500,000 b/d, around 5% of January and February production. Being a drop of 25% in exports from western ports.

The Danish owned "Maersk Magellan" tanker was refused entry into a Spanish port after it had collected a trans shipped load of diesel oil from Vietnamese-flagged product tanker "Elephant" which had acquired it from Cameroon-registered "Nobel" tanker, a ship registered in Russia until 1 July 2022, Elephant was fined $130,000 for breaching Spanish rules. Maersk Magellan transhipped its oil to another ship outside the EU in mid March. Three ships have been detained in Europe, Vietnam-flagged "Melogy" and "Elephant" and Liberia-flagged "HS Arge". Three tankers belonging to Sovcomflot are being de-flagged by Cyprus as they belong to a sanctioned entity.

Oil and gas tax mineral extraction tax (MET) fell to $6.9 billion (521 billion Rubles) in February according to Russian Finance Ministry. This is 46% lower than February 2022. Oil export revenue in February was $11.6 billion, compared to $14.3 billion in January (18% fall) and $20 billion in February 2022 (42% fall).

Russian oil and gas mineral extraction tax (MET) in March was lower than February, but was boosted by a 220 billion roubles quarterly profit-based tax on oil companies giving a total monthly income of $8.7 billion (688 billion roubles), 43% down compared to March 2022. Russian oil exports reach highest since February 2022.

In March 2023, unidentified tankers, shipping oil through the Gulf of Finland after the G7 implemented a $60 price cap on Russian oil, were noted by a lieutenant commander of the Finnish navy. He warned that a lack of transparency could increase the risk of collisions and oil spills there. Consequences of maritime incidences from oil tankers would pose a significant risk to oceans and shoreline communities across the world, according to the statement. Ghost ships are not only used by Russian entities but other maritime shipping companies to evade sanctions.

=== April - June 2023 ===
The threat of OPEC+ reductions caused the price of Ural oil to rise just past the Price Cap of $60. The third largest bank in India, the State Bank of India, advised that it would not process transactions in breach of the price cap. Around 20% of tankers collect fuel from the eastern Russian ports. Greek tankers moved around 40% of Russian oil in March but this will cease if the Ural price exceeds the price cap.

OFAC issued an alert regarding possible sanction breaking with tankers using eastern ports turning off their Automatic Identification Systems (AIS).

January to April Urals price averaged $51 per barrel compared to an average price on $85 in the same period of 2022. Contrary to Russia's announcement of falling production, exports of shipborne oil by Russia increased in April.

In the 6 weeks to 28 May seaborne exports averaged 3.64m b/d which was 1.4m b/d higher than in December 2022 and 0.27m b/d higher than February 2023. The 4 week average export tax revenue to 28 May was $50m per week, down $3m from April and considerably less than the $140m per week average for 2020–2022. China and India bought 80% of Russian crude oil in May, 2.2m b/d and 2m b/d. Tankers in May and June were receiving premiums of 60% to 100% over non Russian oil freight rates.

45% of Russian crude oil was transported by tankers with P&I Club insurance in June 2023. It is estimated that Russia's shadow fleet contains 131 tankers, 99 over 15 years old.

=== July - September 2023 ===
Russia announced on 7 July a reduction of 500,000 b/d in exports from 1 August 2023 to complement its already announced reduction in production.

In August 2023 the price of Russian oil exceeded the cap and reached $73.57 per barrel. Over 50% of Russian oil is transported by a shadow fleet of tankers operating outside western financial and insurance circles.

Despite the rise in crude oil price, the drop in volume meant that Russia had the second lowest revenue month for seaborne crude oil sales in July since the invasion took place. China reduced their purchases of crude oil from Russia by 20% in July. In August India reduced theirs by 22%, from 2.1m b/d to 1.63m b/d.

Poland stated that their oil companies had chartered 10 tankers that had shipped Russian Urals crude oil to the Far East, to bring Middle East crude oil to Poland on the return journey. This only being possible if the tankers were not Russian and had not transhipped oil or carried oil above the price cap price, or they would face arrest.

The Monitoring Group of the Black Sea Institute of Strategic Studies reported that three tankers, the LIPARI, the SEMBRANI and the GUANYIN likely broke sanctions in August by transhipping 377,766 tons of Russian crude oil in the Laconian Gulf off the coast of Greece.

September saw crude oil exports to China rise by 2% with revenues increasing by 25% whereas Indian imports fell 13% and revenues by 20%, making China the largest importer of Russian fossil fuels, buying 47% of Russia's crude oil exports. The USA sanctioned two shipping companies in October and blocked two ships that had been identified using USA service providers while carrying Russian crude oil above the Coalition-agreed price cap. The companies were Lumber Marine from the UAE and Ice Pearl Navigation from Turkey. Those two companies will lose facilities on all their fleet ships and have assets seized.

=== October - December 2023 ===
Freight costs rose for Russia as a result of the sanctions on two companies with some companies dropping out of the market. September 2023 freight rate for a ship on the Baltic to India route was around $5m, it has now risen to $8m.

In November the US sanctioned three more Liberian flagged ships and their shipping companies, all UAE based, Kazan Shipping, Progress Shipping and Gallion Navigation. Their fleets and associated companies are similarly subject to seizure and banned from G7 facilities. This was followed by three more in December.

The US, UK and EU have been putting pressure on Liberia, the Marshall Islands and Panama to undertake additional checks to ensure that tankers using their flags do not carry sanctioned oil purchased above the sanctioned price level.

The UK government sanctioned four ship management companies in Dubai, Oil Tankers (SCF) Management, K&O Ship Management, Radiating World Shipping Services LLC and Star Voyages Shipping Services L.L.C, responsible for 82 tankers, mainly crude oil tankers.

Russian crude oil exports in November fell by 200,000 bpd, mainly due to storms in the Black Sea, with revenue falling by $2.4 billion as the price of Urals crude fell back below the $60 mark in early December amid increased surveillance of sanction breaking.

In 2023, 45-50% of Russian crude and oil products went to China, with India acquiring 40% and Europe taking 5%. Russian oil production for 2023 was down 2% at 523 million tonnes.

=== January - March 2024 ===
Ural oil prices remain around $60. The recent changes to sanctions naming specific grey fleet tankers, managers and owners and warning off banks from dealing with funds associated with these ships has resulted in a number of tankers loaded with oil, sitting idle, unable to find a buyer.

=== April - June 2024 ===
On 25 June 2024 the US, UK and EU sanctions régime were tightened: 27 ships were designated for breaching sanctions according to their IMO number. Amongst the 27 were several tankers, which had been flagged in Gabon, Cook Islands and Panama. Included amongst the sanctioned ships were several operated by Russian government-controlled Sovcomflot (SCF). Dubai and Turkey were amongst the places of incorporation of the ship manager organizations.

== Creation of shadow fleet of tankers ==
Shadow or grey or dark or illicit fleets already existed, used by Iran and Venezuela to try to get around international sanctions. Russia was aware that any sanctions against their country would result in a need to control tankers to export crude and processed oil. Tankers approaching their end of life span were purchased by Russia, Russian oil companies or opportunists who could then rent them out for a large fee to maintain the flow of oil exports. The price of old tankers rose, with vendors making large profits from their sales. By the end of 2022 there were over 600 ships in the shadow fleet, 400 of which were crude oil tankers. Since then the numbers have increased with estimates of 1,100 to 1,400 ships by December 2023. Only 118 of them have been sanctioned by the United States, European Union, or United Kingdom with only three sanctioned by all three according to the Kyiv School of Economics.

The main problem with the Russian shadow fleet is primarily insurance, western countries have minimum criteria for insurance, which includes verification of the condition of the ship. Two thirds of ships carrying Russian oil have "unknown" insurers. The ships are generally old and more prone to breakdown or leakage. in January 2024 the 18 year old sanctioned Peria had an anchor malfunction, leaving the ship stranded in the Bosphorus, closing all traffic. Shadow ship owners disguise the true owners and do not feel obliged to maintain the ships to a high standard. Turning off automatic identification systems and undertaking open sea ship to ship transfers of oil increase risks of collisions and spillages.

Certain flags of convenience are favoured. Gabon has more than doubled its ships registry in 2023 with an estimated 98% of tankers considered high risk with no identifiable owner. The number of incidents affecting these tankers has increased to around two a month, with groundings, collisions, fire and engine failures. Recovering the cost of rescuing these ships is doubtful due to the unknown owner and the unknown insurance, if any.

== Sanctioning vessels and associated companies for breaches ==
Vessels, their owners and associated companies involved in breaches of the sanctions are from autumn 2023 being investigated and sanctioned.

=== Crude oil tankers and owners sanctioned for breaches ===
The US Office of Foreign Assets Control have sanctioned the following crude oil ships and their owners for breaches of the crude oil sanctions:

Month	Sanctioned ship	Flag	Sanctioned owner	Note
October; 2023	SCF Primorye ◇ (IMO 9421960)	Liberia	Lumber Marine SA (ultimate owner Sovcomflot)	Carrying Novy Port crude oil priced above $75 per barrel. Used U.S.-based service provider.
October; 2023	Yasa Golden Bosphorus ◇ (IMO 9334038)	Marshall; Islands	Ice Pearl Navigation Corp c/o Turkey	Carried ESPO crude oil priced above $80 per barrel. Used U.S.-based service provider.
November; 2023	KAZAN ◇ (IMO 9258002)	Liberia	KAZAN SHIPPING INCORPORATED (ultimate owner Sovcomflot)	Exporting Russian oil above the $60 price cap. Used U.S.-person services.
November; 2023	Ligovsky Prospect ◇ (IMO 9256066)	Liberia	PROGRESS SHIPPING COMPANY LIMITED (ultimate owner Sovcomflot)	Exporting Russian oil above the $60 price cap. Used U.S.-person services.
November; 2023	NS Century ◇ ◆ (IMO 9306782)	Liberia	GALLION NAVIGATION INCORPORATED (ultimate owner Sovcomflot)	Exporting Russian oil above the $60 price cap. Used U.S.-person services.
December; 2023	HS ATLANTICA (IMO 9322839)	Liberia	HS ATLANTICA LIMITED (managed by MARITAS FLEET)	Carrying Russian crude oil above agreed price cap. Used U.S.-person services.
December; 2023	NS CHAMPION (IMO 9299719)	Liberia	STERLING SHIPPING INCORPORATED (ultimate owner Sovcomflot)	Carrying Russian crude oil above agreed price cap. Used U.S.-person services.
December; 2023	VIKTOR BAKAEV (IMO 9610810)	Liberia	STREYMOY SHIPPING LIMITED (ultimate owner Sovcomflot)	Carrying Russian crude oil above agreed price cap. Used U.S.-person services.
January; 2024	ARISTO (IMO 9327413) ¤	Liberia	Hennesea Shipping Co Ltd; Dubai, United Arab Emirates (ultimate owner Sovcomflot) designated pursuant to E.O. 14024 for operating or having operated in the marine sector of the Russian Federation economy.	Beneficially owned by Hennesea, as property in which Hennesea has an interest. ▶ HS Atlantica previously sanctioned in December 2023 for carrying Russian crude oil above agreed price cap. ¤ Chemical/Oil product tanker
January; 2024	HAI II (IMO 9259599)	Liberia	Hennesea Shipping Co Ltd; Dubai, United Arab Emirates (ultimate owner Sovcomflot) designated pursuant to E.O. 14024 for operating or having operated in the marine sector of the Russian Federation economy.	Beneficially owned by Hennesea, as property in which Hennesea has an interest. ▶ HS Atlantica previously sanctioned in December 2023 for carrying Russian crude oil above agreed price cap. ¤ Chemical/Oil product tanker
January; 2024	HS ARGE (IMO 9299745)	Liberia	Hennesea Shipping Co Ltd; Dubai, United Arab Emirates (ultimate owner Sovcomflot) designated pursuant to E.O. 14024 for operating or having operated in the marine sector of the Russian Federation economy.	Beneficially owned by Hennesea, as property in which Hennesea has an interest. ▶ HS Atlantica previously sanctioned in December 2023 for carrying Russian crude oil above agreed price cap. ¤ Chemical/Oil product tanker
January; 2024	HS ATLANTICA (IMO 9322839) ▶	Liberia	Hennesea Shipping Co Ltd; Dubai, United Arab Emirates (ultimate owner Sovcomflot) designated pursuant to E.O. 14024 for operating or having operated in the marine sector of the Russian Federation economy.	Beneficially owned by Hennesea, as property in which Hennesea has an interest. ▶ HS Atlantica previously sanctioned in December 2023 for carrying Russian crude oil above agreed price cap. ¤ Chemical/Oil product tanker
January; 2024	HS BURAQ (IMO 9381732)	Liberia	Hennesea Shipping Co Ltd; Dubai, United Arab Emirates (ultimate owner Sovcomflot) designated pursuant to E.O. 14024 for operating or having operated in the marine sector of the Russian Federation economy.	Beneficially owned by Hennesea, as property in which Hennesea has an interest. ▶ HS Atlantica previously sanctioned in December 2023 for carrying Russian crude oil above agreed price cap. ¤ Chemical/Oil product tanker
January; 2024	HS ESBERG (IMO 9410894)	Liberia	Hennesea Shipping Co Ltd; Dubai, United Arab Emirates (ultimate owner Sovcomflot) designated pursuant to E.O. 14024 for operating or having operated in the marine sector of the Russian Federation economy.	Beneficially owned by Hennesea, as property in which Hennesea has an interest. ▶ HS Atlantica previously sanctioned in December 2023 for carrying Russian crude oil above agreed price cap. ¤ Chemical/Oil product tanker
January; 2024	HS EVERETT (IMO 9410870)	Liberia	Hennesea Shipping Co Ltd; Dubai, United Arab Emirates (ultimate owner Sovcomflot) designated pursuant to E.O. 14024 for operating or having operated in the marine sector of the Russian Federation economy.	Beneficially owned by Hennesea, as property in which Hennesea has an interest. ▶ HS Atlantica previously sanctioned in December 2023 for carrying Russian crude oil above agreed price cap. ¤ Chemical/Oil product tanker
January; 2024	HS GLORY (IMO 9249087)	Liberia	Hennesea Shipping Co Ltd; Dubai, United Arab Emirates (ultimate owner Sovcomflot) designated pursuant to E.O. 14024 for operating or having operated in the marine sector of the Russian Federation economy.	Beneficially owned by Hennesea, as property in which Hennesea has an interest. ▶ HS Atlantica previously sanctioned in December 2023 for carrying Russian crude oil above agreed price cap. ¤ Chemical/Oil product tanker
January; 2024	HS LEGEND (IMO 9381744)	Liberia	Hennesea Shipping Co Ltd; Dubai, United Arab Emirates (ultimate owner Sovcomflot) designated pursuant to E.O. 14024 for operating or having operated in the marine sector of the Russian Federation economy.	Beneficially owned by Hennesea, as property in which Hennesea has an interest. ▶ HS Atlantica previously sanctioned in December 2023 for carrying Russian crude oil above agreed price cap. ¤ Chemical/Oil product tanker
January; 2024	HS STAR (IMO 9274446)	Liberia	Hennesea Shipping Co Ltd; Dubai, United Arab Emirates (ultimate owner Sovcomflot) designated pursuant to E.O. 14024 for operating or having operated in the marine sector of the Russian Federation economy.	Beneficially owned by Hennesea, as property in which Hennesea has an interest. ▶ HS Atlantica previously sanctioned in December 2023 for carrying Russian crude oil above agreed price cap. ¤ Chemical/Oil product tanker
January; 2024	LA PRIDE (IMO 9274616)	Liberia	Hennesea Shipping Co Ltd; Dubai, United Arab Emirates (ultimate owner Sovcomflot) designated pursuant to E.O. 14024 for operating or having operated in the marine sector of the Russian Federation economy.	Beneficially owned by Hennesea, as property in which Hennesea has an interest. ▶ HS Atlantica previously sanctioned in December 2023 for carrying Russian crude oil above agreed price cap. ¤ Chemical/Oil product tanker
January; 2024	MONA (IMO 9314818) ¤	Liberia	Hennesea Shipping Co Ltd; Dubai, United Arab Emirates (ultimate owner Sovcomflot) designated pursuant to E.O. 14024 for operating or having operated in the marine sector of the Russian Federation economy.	Beneficially owned by Hennesea, as property in which Hennesea has an interest. ▶ HS Atlantica previously sanctioned in December 2023 for carrying Russian crude oil above agreed price cap. ¤ Chemical/Oil product tanker
January; 2024	NELLIS (IMO 9322267)	Liberia	Hennesea Shipping Co Ltd; Dubai, United Arab Emirates (ultimate owner Sovcomflot) designated pursuant to E.O. 14024 for operating or having operated in the marine sector of the Russian Federation economy.	Beneficially owned by Hennesea, as property in which Hennesea has an interest. ▶ HS Atlantica previously sanctioned in December 2023 for carrying Russian crude oil above agreed price cap. ¤ Chemical/Oil product tanker
January; 2024	OSPEROUS (IMO 9412995)	Liberia	Hennesea Shipping Co Ltd; Dubai, United Arab Emirates (ultimate owner Sovcomflot) designated pursuant to E.O. 14024 for operating or having operated in the marine sector of the Russian Federation economy.	Beneficially owned by Hennesea, as property in which Hennesea has an interest. ▶ HS Atlantica previously sanctioned in December 2023 for carrying Russian crude oil above agreed price cap. ¤ Chemical/Oil product tanker
January; 2024	PERIA (IMO 9322827)	Liberia	Hennesea Shipping Co Ltd; Dubai, United Arab Emirates (ultimate owner Sovcomflot) designated pursuant to E.O. 14024 for operating or having operated in the marine sector of the Russian Federation economy.	Beneficially owned by Hennesea, as property in which Hennesea has an interest. ▶ HS Atlantica previously sanctioned in December 2023 for carrying Russian crude oil above agreed price cap. ¤ Chemical/Oil product tanker
January; 2024	SARA II (IMO 9301615) ¤	Liberia	Hennesea Shipping Co Ltd; Dubai, United Arab Emirates (ultimate owner Sovcomflot) designated pursuant to E.O. 14024 for operating or having operated in the marine sector of the Russian Federation economy.	Beneficially owned by Hennesea, as property in which Hennesea has an interest. ▶ HS Atlantica previously sanctioned in December 2023 for carrying Russian crude oil above agreed price cap. ¤ Chemical/Oil product tanker
January; 2024	SENSUS (IMO 9296585) ¤	Liberia	Hennesea Shipping Co Ltd; Dubai, United Arab Emirates (ultimate owner Sovcomflot) designated pursuant to E.O. 14024 for operating or having operated in the marine sector of the Russian Federation economy.	Beneficially owned by Hennesea, as property in which Hennesea has an interest. ▶ HS Atlantica previously sanctioned in December 2023 for carrying Russian crude oil above agreed price cap. ¤ Chemical/Oil product tanker
January; 2024	UZE (IMO 9323338) ¤	Liberia	Hennesea Shipping Co Ltd; Dubai, United Arab Emirates (ultimate owner Sovcomflot) designated pursuant to E.O. 14024 for operating or having operated in the marine sector of the Russian Federation economy.	Beneficially owned by Hennesea, as property in which Hennesea has an interest. ▶ HS Atlantica previously sanctioned in December 2023 for carrying Russian crude oil above agreed price cap. ¤ Chemical/Oil product tanker

Notes:
◇ Since being sanctioned, a number of ships have ceased operations. In mid November 2023, SCF Primorye is in Russia, anchored near Murmansk. Yasa Golden Bosphorus unloaded and is now on charter to Exxon Mobil Corp and is waiting off Mexico. Kazan and Ligovsky Prospect are both in dock in China and NS Century was off Sri Lanka looking for a port to unload at.

◆ In mid December NS Century, whose original destination was Vadinar in India, was still waiting off Sri Lanka and had been joined by two other crude tankers owned by Sovocomflot. In addition the Krymsk has been stationary off the port of Paradip in India since 4 December and has been joined by the Nellis. These ships hold 5 million barrels of crude oil. Reportedly Russia does not want to be paid in rupee's, preferring UAE dirham's, however Sakhalin 1 LLC has been unable to open a bank account. India claimed the Russian oil was not at a competitive price.

=== Oil traders ===
On 20 December 2023 the US Department of the Treasury announced sanctions against three companies that have traded Russian oil that had been sold at a price that did not comply with the price cap rules, including Voliton DMCC from the UAE and Bellatrix Energy Limited and Covart Energy Limited of Hong Kong. Covart owns oil products tanker Sanar 15 (IMO 9777670) which is also sanctioned.

=== Insurance of tankers ===
Suspected breaches of sanctions by insurance companies are investigated. Sometimes the insurance company is provided with false information regarding the source of the cargo, its price, the destination, and even the ships name and IMO number when an application for insurance is made.

Insurance company Ro Marine, based in Oslo, Norway, cancelled insurance on three tankers in December 2023, identified as non-compliant with oil price cap or dark trading allegations and is monitoring seven more.

== Analysis of economic impact ==
Russia's Finance Minister Anton Siluanov said in late December 2022 that the effect of the price cap may increase Russia's budget deficit of 2% for 2023. Russia claims their actions in diverting oil to other buyers has effectively eliminated effects of the direct price cap on the Russian economy. The economic cost to Russia of losing the European market is huge, both in redundant pipelines and facilities and in lost future revenue.

The average price for Russian crude oil in January 2023 was $49.48pb down 42% in January 2022 prices and well below the $60pb price cap. Early projections by the EU estimated that the price cap on Russian oil would cost Russia around 160m euros ($175m) every day ($60b pa). While some analysts have ascertained that reduced earnings for the Russian energy sector in late 2022 and early 2023 were due to the price cap, others have noted that commodity prices have fallen in that period, crude by at least 20%.

The economic impact of the sanctions in the first quarter on Russian revenues are clearly shown in the total oil and gas revenue received by Russia in quarter 1 of 2023 was 1.6 trillion rubles ($19.61 billion), compared to an average of $42 billion per quarter in 2022 (down 41%) and $32 billion per quarter in 2021.

A US Treasury report in May 2023 highlighted that Russian oil exports were continuing to rise, providing stability in the world market, as planned, whilst Russia's revenue was being restrained by the price cap to $5–6 billion per month, compared with $8–15 billion a month in 2022. Russia now levies more tax on oil producers to help offset falling revenue. Market participants and geopolitical analysts now acknowledge that the price cap is accomplishing both of its goals.

Russia's revenue from oil and gas remained low in the second quarter of 2023 with June oil and revenues at 528 billion rubles, the total for the half year being 3.38 trillion rubles ($37.4 billion).

Russia remains reliant on the European & G7 shipping industry to freight 50% of its crude and 65% of its processed oil.

In July 2023, the price for Urals crude for the first time topped the price of $60 per barrel. Many nations such as India and China had been purchasing Russian oil at a discount set by Russia, and the current price increase triggered by a renewed OPEC+ cut were seen as critical factors that could undermine the sanctions regime implemented by the E.U. the U.S. and other Western nations. Overall volumes of Russian crude have fluctuated after the onset of the war but did not meaningfully decline. In September 2023, G7/EU appear to have paused its Russian oil cap reviews.

In the first 11 months of 2023 Russian seaborne crude oil exports to coalition countries fell by 58m tonnes, whilst exports to non price-cap coalition countries rose by 61m tonnes indicating little change in the volume of seaborne crude oil exported. Revenue for Russia on the seaborne exports fell with coalition countries paying €32.2bn less whilst non price-cap coalition countries paid just €11.6bn more, resulting in a reduction of over €20bn. This indicates a reduced sale price per barrel which has impacted heavily on the Russian tax take on crude oil.

The US sanctioning of specific vessels for breaches of the price cap sanction may be having an effect on India in December 2023, with five sanctioned tankers holding around 5m barrels of crude oil waiting for weeks to unload. India claiming the oil is overpriced, most of the tankers sailed to China to unload.

The use of shadow tankers and secretive oil traders has led to delays in Russian oil companies being paid, with remittances falling from the normal one month after sailing to five to six months, resulting in cash flow problems and a risk of non payment.

2023 saw a fall in Russia's oil and gas tax revenues of 24% to 8.8 trillion roubles ($99.4 billion) compared to 2022 mainly due to lower oil prices, the tax revenue includes additional higher taxes that were not levied in 2022.

== See also ==
- EU natural gas price cap – Price cap imposed by EU
- 2023 Russian oil products sanctions and price cap – Economic measures following the Russian invasion of Ukraine
- Embargo of Russian oil during the Russo-Ukrainian War
- International sanctions during the Russian invasion of Ukraine – Economic measures against Russia and Belarus since 2022
- Petroleum industry in Russia – One of the largest in the world
