= Embargo of Russian oil during the Russo-Ukrainian war =

Since the start of the Russian invasion of Ukraine in 2022, the European Union, the G7 nations and Australia have imposed sanctions on Russia. The sanctions on oil began in December 2022 and included an embargo of Russian oil, namely, the bringing of crude oil and refined oil products from Russia to the EU and other G7 nations by ship, with a few exceptions.

Sanctions apply to anyone facilitating the maritime transport of such oil in breach of the embargo, including trading and commodities brokering, financing, shipping, insurance, including reinsurance and protection and indemnity, and flagging and customs brokering.

On 23 June 2023 as part of the 11th sanctions package, the EU prohibited access to European ports of all vessels suspected “with reasonable cause”, of having been involved in transshipment of Russian oil at a price higher than the price cap, or having turned off their Automatic Identification System trackers.

Certain ships carrying oil have been flagged as being probably in violation of the embargo and some have been specifically sanctioned, as have their owners/managers.

The number of ships considered in violation of the embargo can be significant. In October 2023, 2 carrying crude oil and 21 with oil products were identified, out of a total of 182 tankers carrying oil from Russian Black Sea ports that month.

In 2023, under 5% of Russian crude oil products went to Europe, a fall of 90% in the year.

== History ==
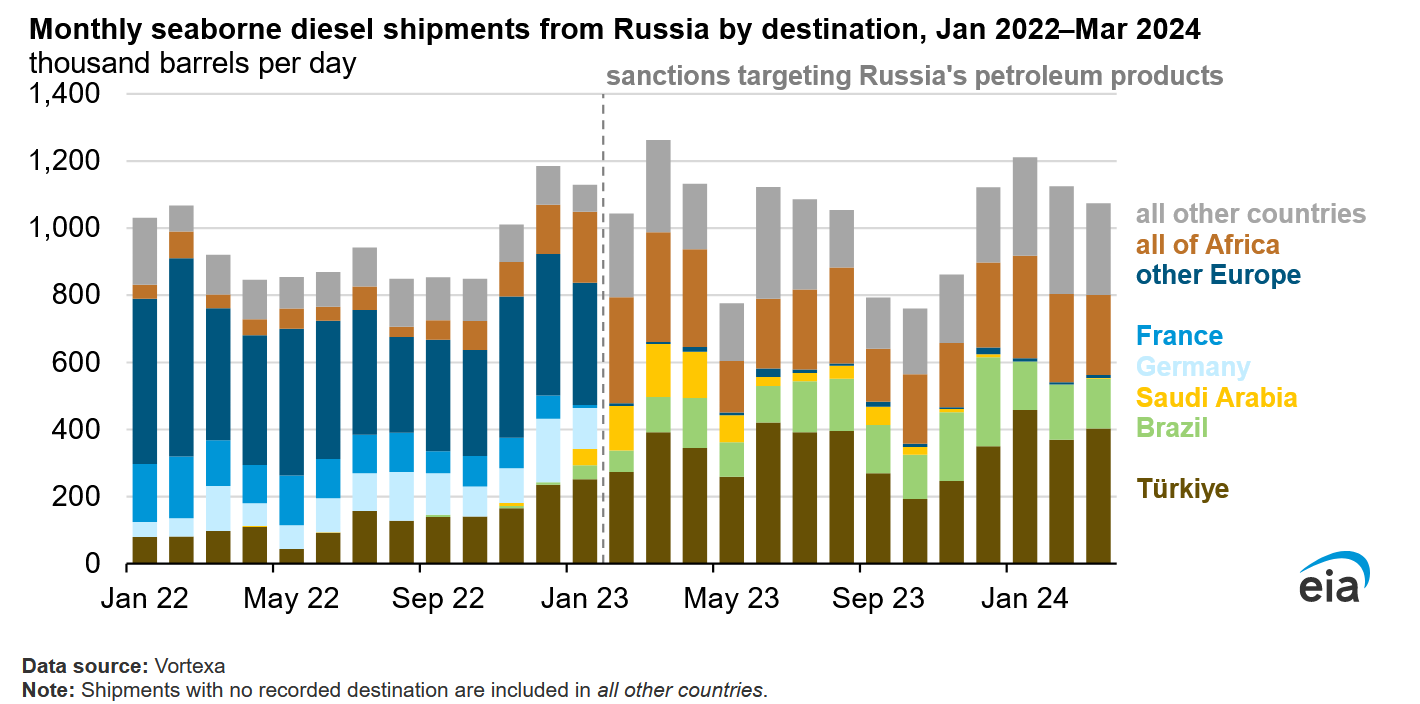
Changes in the composition of seaborne diesel exports from Russia, 2022–2024

During and after Russian intervention in the Syrian civil war in 2015, sanctions have been used against Russian tankers by the United States, including product tankers Sudak (IMO:8943155) and Sig (IMO: 9735335), chemical tanker Stalingrad (IMO: 9690212) and the combined chemical and oil tankers Marshal Zhukov (IMO: 9690224) and Yaz (IMO: 9735323). In 2022, following the Russian invasion of Ukraine, 72 ships were directly sanctioned by the US Treasury's Office of Foreign Assets Control (OFAC). Sanctions do not aim to stop these vessels from trading and they have been seen to berth in overseas ports, however they have been restricted by the sanctions, with most ports of call being in Turkey, India, Iran and Egypt.

== Breaches of sanctions ==
Whilst the price of crude remained below the $60 level, breaches were generally limited to small quantities of oil imported into the EU from Russia and transshipment of oil at sea, however when the oil price rose in Summer 2023, the number of potential breaches increased with oil being purchased at a price over the oil cap price.

=== Ship-to-ship transshipments ===
The object of ship-to-ship transshipments is to mask the source of the oil, to hide from the buyer (or the authorities) that the oil is Russian and subject to sanctions. Ships involved in transshipments have been known to change their names and their paint colours during voyages and to turn off their Automatic Identification System trackers.

Transshipments have taken place off the Russian exclave of Kaliningrad, in the Black Sea and in the Mediterranean Sea. The majority of transshipments from ships leaving the Black Sea have taken place in the Gulf of Laconia, close to Greece, but outside of the 6-mile territorial limit, it is in international waters. The Jumbo is a crude oil tanker, Gabon flagged, that was based in the gulf acting as a depot tanker, with some ships delivering oil to the depot and others collecting from it.

=== Shipping refined oil from Bulgaria ===
Bulgaria has the Lukoil Neftohim Burgas refinery where Russian crude has been allowed under EU rules to be brought by ship. The refined oil is under an export ban by the EU, however refined oil has been shipped to the EU and the US in 2023. Seaexpress a product tanker managed by Thenamaris Ship Management collected 40,000 tons on 10 August 2023 and delivered it on 23 August to Rotterdam. Ship-to-ship transfers were used to send Naphtha from Burgas to the US in June 2023. Bulgaria is cancelling the export quotas given to the refinery from 1 January 2024. The European Commission is investigating the situation. Bulgaria will also cease the importation of Russian crude oil on 1 March 2024.

== Crude Oil ==
The embargo came into effect on 5 December 2022 with a 45-day transition period, all ships had to load by 5 December 2022 and unload at the destination port before 19 January 2023.

Around 100 tankers are under investigation by the US in November 2023, with management companies being asked to provide evidence that the price cap has not been breached by the tankers. The EU/G7 countries put pressure on crude oil tanker flag countries in late 2023 to run better checks that their crude oil tankers are not breaching the $60 price cap limit.

=== Ships believed to be in violation of the embargo ===
Tons delivered and numbers of crude oil tankers identified in probably being in violation of the embargo, in 2023, through direct delivery or transshipment:

Month	Tons	Direct shipments	Transshipments	Note
January 2023	1,274,281	3	9 (all Laconian Gulf)	
February	869,776	3	4 (all Laconian Gulf)	
March	476,449	0	4 (all Laconian Gulf)	
April	801,594	1	5 (all Laconian Gulf)	
May	1,554,020	2	11 (all Laconian Gulf)	
June	1,134,445	1	8 (all Laconian Gulf)	
July	222,316	0	2 (all Laconian Gulf)	
August	377,766	0	3 (all Laconian Gulf)	
September	496,854	0	4 (all Laconian Gulf)	
October	274,240	1	1 (Laconian Gulf)	
November	683,186	2	3 (all Laconian Gulf)	
December 2023	784,566	2	4 (all Laconian Gulf)	

=== Transshipments of crude oil from Russia ===
Transshipments of crude oil have involved ships belonging to companies from Cyprus, Greece, India, Indonesia, Liberia, Turkey and the UAE, flying under flags of Liberia, Malta, Palau, Panama, Marshall Islands and Turkey. |

=== Direct shipments of crude oil from Russia to a sanctioning country ===
The following oil tankers have been identified as probably being in violation of the embargo by transporting crude oil directly from a Russian port to an EU/G7 port in 2023 by the Monitoring Group of BlackSeaNews and the Black Sea Institute of Strategic Studies.

Ship	Month	Direct to Port	Flag	Owner	Manager	Note
BEKS FENIX	January 2023	Slovenia, Koper	Marshall Islands	COLEUS MARITIME & TRADING INC, c/o Turkey	BEKS GEMI ISLETMECILIGI VE TIC, Turkey	
MINERVA LISA	January 2023	Netherlands, Rotterdam	Greece	LISA ENE, c/o Greece	MINERVA MARINE INC, Greece	Note △
ADVANTAGE SWEET	January 2023	Spain, Cartagena	Marshall Islands	SPDBFL ONE HUNDRED EIGHTY-7, c/o Turkey	GENEL DENIZCILIK NAKLIYATI AS, Turkey	
SEAOATH	February 2023	Netherlands, Rotterdam	Malta	SEACARGO SHIPPING LTD, c/o Greece	Thenamaris Ships Management Inc, Greece	Note △
BEKS EBRU	February 2023	Italy, Augusta, Sicily	Marshall Islands	DOLPHIN MARITIME & TRADING-MAI, c/o Denmark	MAERSK TANKERS MR K/S, Denmark	
PROMITHEAS	February 2023	Italy, Trieste	Greece	TRITON SUCCESS SA, c/o Greece	TSAKOS SHIPPING & TRADING SA, Greece	
GREEN AURA	April 2023	Netherlands Antilles, Sint Eustatius	Liberia	Aegeanzhou Beta Inc, Greece	Aegean Shipping Management S.A, Greece	
EURONIKE	May 2023	Spain, Bilbao	Malta	TSAKOS COLUMBIA SHIPMANAGEMENT, Greece	TSAKOS COLUMBIA SHIPMANAGEMENT, Greece	
SEARUNNER	May 2023	Netherlands, Rotterdam	Malta	Thenamaris Ships Management Inc, Greece	Thenamaris Ships Management Inc, Greece	Note △
ELANDRA FALCON	June 2023	Italy, Milazzo	Marshall Islands	SEA 101 LEASING CO LTD, c/o Latvia	LSC SIA, Latvia	
SEAVIGOUR	October 2023	Italy, Millazo, Sicily	Malta	ACHATES NAVIGATION INC, c/o Greece	Thenamaris Ships Management Inc, Greece	Note △
ELANDRA EAGLE	November 2023	Spain, Cartagena	Marshall Islands	SEA 100 LEASING CO LTD c/o UK	MANSEL LTD, UK	
SEAVIOLET	November 2023	Italy, Ancona	Malta	LAVENDER MARINE LTD c/o Greece	Thenamaris Ships Management, Greece	Note △
SEACALM	December 2023	Poland, Gdansk	Marshall Islands	FISHER MARITIME c/o Greece	Thenamaris Ships Management, Greece	Note △
BANDA	December 2023	Italy, Santa Panagia	Liberia	CRUDE PETROLEUM VENTURES SA c/o Greece	CHEMNAV SHIPMANAGEMENT LTD, Greece	

Note △ In November 2023 Thenamaris Ships Management Inc, Minerva Marine and TMS Tankers, all major Greek shipping companies, announced they had ceased all shipments of Russian oil, to avoid U.S. sanctions.

== Oil products ==
The embargo came into effect on 5 December 2022 with a grace period, all ships had to load by 5 February 2023 and unload before 1 April 2023.

=== Ships believed to be in violation of the embargo ===
Tons delivered and numbers of product tankers identified, probably in violation of the embargo in 2023, through direct shipment or transshipment of the product:

Month	Tons	Direct shipments	Transshipments	Note
February 2023	403,990	1	10 (9 Laconian Gulf, 1 off Malta)	
March	737,856	2	15 (14 Laconian Gulf, 1 off Malta)	
April	726,210	2	15 (all Laconian Gulf)	
May	896,840	5	17 (16 Laconian Gulf, 1 off Malta)	
June	730,497	8	14 (12 Laconian Gulf, 2 off Malta)	
July	808,547	5	17 (14 Laconian Gulf, 1 off Crete, 1 off Malta)	
August	563,843	3	14 (11 Laconian Gulf, 1 off Crete, 2 off Malta)	
September	1,094,975	6	24 (21 Laconian Gulf, 3 off Malta)	
October	830,346	3	18 (all Laconian Gulf )	
November	530,984	4	12 (all Laconian Gulf )	
December 2023	551,893	1	15 (all Laconian Gulf )	

=== Transshipments of oil products from Russia ===
Transshipments of oil products have involved ships belonging to companies from Denmark, Germany, Greece, India, Liberia, Marshall Islands, Malta, Russia, Seychelles, Singapore, Turkey and the UAE, flying under flags of Cook Islands, Gabon, Liberia, Malta, Marshall Islands, Palau, Panama, Russia, Seychelles, Singapore, St Kitts and Nevis.

=== Direct shipments of oil products from Russia to a sanctioning country ===
The following oil product ships have been identified as probably being in violation of the embargo on seaborne imports of Russian oil products into the EU/G7 by the Monitoring Group of BlackSeaNews and the Black Sea Institute of Strategic Studies.

Ship	Month	Direct to Port	Flag	Owner	Manager	Note
NEW SPIRIT	February 2023	Spain, Motril	Malta	VICTORIA MARITIME CO, c/o Greece	PROTANK MANAGEMENT SA 44, Greece	
MARINER A	March 2023	USA, Wilmington	Malta	ADELE OWNING CO LTD, c/o Greece	ANCORA INVESTMENT TRUST INC, Greece	
MRC BELIZ	March 2023	France, Rouen	Malta	MRC BELIZ SHIPPING CORP LTD, c/o Turkey	MRC DENIZCILIK TURIZM, Turkey	
CHAMPION CONTEST	April 2023	USA, Baltimore	Norway	TRUST TWO AS, Norway	CHAMPION TANKERS AS, Norway	
RUI FU TAI	April 2023	Spain, Algeciras	Liberia	ARTEMIS SHIPPING CO LTD, c/o Hong Kong	LUCKY SHIP PTE LTD, Singapore	
TAXIARHIS	May 2023	Italy, Sarroch, Sardinia	Liberia	CIRCINUS CORP, c/o Greece	FLYNN VENTURES LTD, Greece	
HAMSI	May 2023	Greece, Agioi Theodoroi	Liberia	SEALIFE SHIPPING LTD, c/o Turkey	SEALIFE DENIZCILIK LTD, Turkey	
MERONAS	May 2023	USA, Fairless Hills, Delaware River	Greece	FAIRLINE NAVIGATION LTD, c/o Greece	EASTERN MEDITERRANEAN MTME-LIE, Greece	
ECO FLEET	May 2023	Croatia, Rijeka	Marshall Islands	COMPASS SHIPPING 49 CORP LTD, c/o Greece	CENTRAL MARE INC, Greece	
YASH	May 2023	France, Rouen	Liberia	YASH TANKERS LTD, USA	SAFESEA TRANSPORT INC, USA	
HAPPY LADY	June 2023	Belgium, Ghent	Greece	ADRIATIC VENTURES CO, Greece	EASTERN MEDITERRANEAN MARITIME 69, Greece	
HAMSI	June 2023	Greece, Agioi Theodorio	Liberia	SEALIFE SHIPPING LTD, c/o Turkey	SEALIFE DENIZCILIK LTD, Turkey	
NAZAN	June 2023	Greece, Astakos	Panama	BURTRANS DENIZCILIK, Turkey	BURTRANS DENIZCILIK, Turkey	
VF TANKER 9	June 2023	Greece, Thessaloniki	Russia	VOLGA SHIPPING JOINT STOCK, Russia	VOLGA SHIPPING JOINT STOCK, Russia	Sanctioned by UK May 2023
ATLAS STAR	June 2023	Greece, Agioi Theodorio	Liberia	ATLAS STAR SHIPPING LTD, Greece	LION BULK CARRIERS IN, Greece	
CHAMPION STAR	June 2023	Belgium, Ghent	Liberia	NERO TANKERS AS, c/o Norway	CHAMPION TANKERS AS, Norway	
ECO FLEET	June 2023	Croatia, Rijeka	Marshall Islands	COMPASS SHIPPING 49 CORP LTD, c/o Greece	CENTRAL MARE INC, Greece	
HAMSI	June 2023	Greece, Agioi Theodorio	Liberia	SEALIFE SHIPPING LTD, c/o Turkey	SEALIFE DENIZCILIK LTD, Turkey	
NEW SPIRIT	June 2023	Spain, Motril	Malta	VICTORIA MARITIME CO, c/o Greece	PROTANK MANAGEMENT SA 44, Greece	
HAPPY LADY	June 2023	Belgium, Ghent	Greece	ADRIATIC VENTURES CO, Greece	EASTERN MEDITERRANEAN MARITIME 69, Greece	
ECO FLEET	July 2023	Croatia, Rijeka	Marshall Islands	COMPASS SHIPPING 49 CORP LTD, c/o Greece	CENTRAL MARE INC, Greece	
RUI FU TAI	July 2023	Spain, Algeciras	Liberia	ARTEMIS SHIPPING CO LTD, c/o Hong Kong	LUCKY SHIP PTE LTD, Singapore	
KHUDAYAR YUSIFZADE	July 2023	Greece, Elefsis	Liberia	ARMADA VOYAGER ONE CO LTD, c/o Turkey	PALMALI GEMICILIK VE ACENTELIK, Turkey	
HAMSI	July 2023	Greece, Agioi Theodorio	Liberia	SEALIFE SHIPPING LTD, c/o Turkey	SEALIFE DENIZCILIK LTD, Turkey	
ATHINA M	August 2023	Belgium, Antwerp	Greece	SOCIETY MARITIME CO, c/o Greece	EASTERN MEDITERRANEAN MARITIME 69, Greece	
JANAKI	August 2023	France, Rouen	Liberia	ANYA SHIPPING LTD, c/o USA	SAFESEA GROUP LLC, USA	
HAMSI	August 2023	Greece, Piraeus	Liberia	SEALIFE SHIPPING LTD, c/o Turkey	SEALIFE DENIZCILIK LTD, Turkey	
HAPPY LADY	September 2023	Greece, Lavrio	Greece	ADRIATIC VENTURES CO, Greece	EASTERN MEDITERRANEAN MARITIME 69, Greece	
HAMSI	September 2023	Greece, Piraeus	Liberia	SEALIFE SHIPPING LTD, c/o Turkey	SEALIFE DENIZCILIK LTD, Turkey	
NEW RANGER	September 2023	Spain, Motril	Liberia	FONTANA SHIPPING & TRADING CO, Liberia	PROTANK MANAGEMENT SA 44, Greece	
MERSEY	September 2023	Belgium, Ghent	Marshall Islands	SHINTOKU PANAMA SA, Japan	SHINTOKU PANAMA SA, Japan	
SAN SEBASTIAN	September 2023	Croatia, Rijeka	Malta	GESTIONI ARMATORIALI SRL, Italy	GESTIONI ARMATORIALI SRL, Italy	
YASH	September 2023	USA, Baltimore	Liberia	YASH TANKERS LTD, USA	SAFESEA TRANSPORT INC, USA	
RUI FU TAI	October 2023	Spain, Algeciras	Liberia	ARTEMIS SHIPPING CO LTD, c/o Hong Kong	LUCKY SHIP PTE LTD, Singapore	
HAMSI	October 2023	Greece, Perama	Liberia	SEALIFE SHIPPING LTD, c/o Turkey	SEALIFE DENIZCILIK LTD, Turkey	
HONESTY	October 2023	Spain, Algeciras	Liberia	HONESTY MARINE INC, Greece	SEA PIONEER SHIPPING CORP-LIB, Greece	
AVENCA	November 2023	USA, Jacksonville	Liberia	ORYX SHIPPING COMPANY NV, c/o Germany	CHEMIKALIEN SEETRANSPORT GMBH, Germany	
NEW SPIRIT	November 2023	Spain, Motril	Malta	VICTORIA MARITIME CO, c/o Greece	PROTANK MANAGEMENT SA 44, Greece	
GLOSTER 1	November 2023	Greece, Thessaloniki	Cook Islands	KINGSLYNN LTD, Cook Islands	KINGSLYNN LTD, Cook Islands	
NEW RANGER	November 2023	Italy, Ravenna	Liberia	FONTANA SHIPPING & TRADING CO, Liberia	PROTANK MANAGEMENT SA 44, Greece	
JANAKI	December 2023	France, Radicatel, Rouen	Liberia	ANYA SHIPPING LTD c/o USA	SAFESEA GROUP LLC, NJ, USA	

== Enforcement of sanctions ==
In autumn 2023 the US and UK began applying sanctions against entities complicit with breaches of sanctions

=== Management companies of tankers ===
The management of "dark fleet" tankers are regularly changed by Russia in an effort to avoid sanctions. Lloyd's List defines a tanker as "dark fleet if it is aged 15 years or over, anonymously owned and/or has a corporate structure designed to obfuscate beneficial ownership discovery, solely deployed in sanctioned oil trades, and engaged in one or more of the deceptive shipping practices outlined by US State Department guidance issued in May 2020."

==== Sanctioned shipmanagement companies ====
The UK Government have sanctioned the following management companies under the Sanctions and Anti-Money Laundering Act 2018:

Month	Sanctioned manager	ships under management	Flags	Note
May 2023	Sun Ship Management (D) Ltd; Dubai, United Arab Emirates	92 vessels oil, LNG and chemical tankers		probably owned by Sovcomflot tankers owned by Sovcomflot
December 2023	Oil Tankers (SCF) Management; Dubai, United Arab Emirates	61 tankers		tankers owned by Sovcomflot
December 2023	K&O Ship Management; Dubai, United Arab Emirates	4 tankers	Panama	owners unknown, management changed to Prominent Shipmangement Ltd, China
December 2023	Radiating World Shipping Services LLC ♦ Dubai, United Arab Emirates	17 tankers: nine aframaxes three suezmax tankers five product tankers	Cook Islands	owners unknown
December 2023	Star Voyages Shipping Services L.L.C ♦ Dubai, United Arab Emirates	17 tankers: nine aframaxes three suezmax tankers five product tankers	Cook Islands	owners unknown

- ♦ Companies have been moving tankers to other managers including One Moon Marine Services LLC.

The US Government have sanctioned the following management companies being designated pursuant to E.O. 14024:

Month	Sanctioned company	ships	Flags	Note
December 2023	SUN Ship Management D Ltd; Dubai, United Arab Emirates manager	SCF Primorye and others		tankers owned by Sovcomflot
January 2024	Hennesea Shipping Co Ltd; Dubai, United Arab Emirates owner	HS Atlantica and 17 others including five chemical/product tankers	Liberia	tankers owned by Hennesea Shipping Co and ultimately by Sovcomflot.

=== Insurance of tankers ===
Suspected breaches of sanctions by insurance companies are investigated. Sometimes the insurance company is provided with false information regarding the source of the cargo, its price, the destination, and even the ships name and IMO number when an application for insurance is made.

In December 2023 an insurance company Continental Steamship Owners Mutual Protecting & Indemnity Association Ltd. incorporated in the Marshall Islands, but based in Estonia, was “forcibly dissolved”. The company was insuring 27 elderly, anonymously owned tankers, 10 of which appear to have been using fraudulently issued IMO company numbers.

=== Flag state and tankers ===
Suspected breaches of sanctions by flag states are investigated. Pressure is being put on nations to increase oversight of ships carrying their flags, both to ensure they do not breach sanctions but to also enforce safety and environmental standards.

Most tankers suspected of breaching sanctions since 2021 fly the flag of Liberia, Liberia's flag registry is administered by a private US company based in Virginia, USA, as is the Marshall Islands flag. Panama, Gabon, the Cook Islands, Palau and Vietnam all flag more than 5% of tankers suspected of breaches.

Cameroon flagged ships were banned from entering United Arab Emirates ports due to safety concerns from January 2024, many of their tankers are old and ply their trade with Russia whilst having a poor safety record.

=== Sale of tankers ===
Sanctions announced in December 2023 require notification rules to be followed for the sale of tankers to any third country to make it transparent in an attempt to identify tankers that could be used to evade the import ban on Russian crude or petroleum products.

== See also ==
- 2022 Russian crude oil price cap sanctions – Economic sanction following the Russian invasion of Ukraine
- 2023 Russian oil products sanctions and price cap – Economic measures following the Russian invasion of Ukraine
- International sanctions during the Russian invasion of Ukraine – Economic measures against Russia and Belarus since 2022
- Russian shadow fleet – Russian vessels evading sanctions
