= 2023 Russian oil products sanctions and price cap =

Economic measures following the Russian invasion of Ukraine

As part of the sanctions which have been imposed on the Russian Federation as a result of the 2022 Russian invasion of Ukraine, on 2 September 2022, finance ministers of the G7 group of nations agreed to cap the price of Russian oil and petroleum products in an effort which was intended to reduce Russia's ability to finance its war on Ukraine and curb further increases in the 2021–2022 inflation surge.

The sanctions against buying Russian oil products took effect on 5 February 2023, introduced as part of the sixth package of restrictions, they were designed to complement the sanctions and price cap on Russian crude oil which were introduced in December 2022. They target products under CN code 2710.

In 2022, the Russian Federation was cushioned against crude oil and gas-based sanction effects as a result of the global rise in oil and gas prices. The price cap sanction was introduced in an attempt to remove the cushion so the revenue which is earned by Russia is restricted and the price of it will not rise when world oil and gas product prices rise in the future. As the European Union imported a greater proportion of Russian exported refined oil than crude oil, the impact of this new sanction will be greater.

Russian production of oil products fell 11% in 2023 due to sanctions and low European demand.

== Sanctions ==
Sanctions on refined oil products were effected on 5 February 2023 and apply to the following Russian oil products falling under combined nomenclature code 2710, being "Petroleum oils and oils obtained from bituminous minerals (excluding crude); preparations containing >= 70% by weight of petroleum oils or of oils obtained from bituminous minerals, these oils being the basic constituents of the preparations, n.e.s.; waste oils containing mainly petroleum or bituminous minerals.":

- High value (premium-to-crude products), including Gasoline (Petrol), Diesel fuel, Jet fuel/Kerosene
- Low value (discount-to-crude products), including Naphtha, High Sulphur Fuel Oil (HSFO)

The G7 countries, plus the rest of the EU and Australia are amongst the main countries imposing the sanctions, a minority of the global nations.

As with the 2022 Russian oil price cap, sanctions come in two parts:

1. A ban by each sanctioning country on importing any Russian refined oil products.
2. Sanctions apply to anyone facilitating the maritime transport of refined oil products originating in Russia if the goods are not traded at or beneath the cap levels, including, Trading/commodities brokering, Financing, Shipping, Insurance, including reinsurance and protection and indemnity, Flagging and Customs brokering.

A transitional period of 55 days is granted for vessels carrying Russian petroleum products, purchased and loaded prior to 5 February and unloaded prior to 1 April 2023.

Sanctions cease when the oil product is landed outside of Russian territory and handed to the purchaser or blending operations in a third country “result in a tariff shift” or changes in the oil product type.

== Price cap ==
Within the EU, there had been a lengthy debate about the determination of a price cap for the various products with Poland and the Baltic countries wanting lower prices.

Price cap levels agreed by G7 and the EU on 3 February 2023:

- Premium-to-crude products, including diesel, kerosene and gasoline - US$100per barrel
- Discount-to-crude products, including fuel oil - US$45per barrel

The prices will be kept under review.

== Russian oil products ==
Russia refines around 5.5m barrels per day (bpd) of crude oil and gas condensate, the third largest in the world. Roughly 50% was exported in 2021 and 2022. The EU in 2021 received around 2m bpd of fuel oil from Russia, around 70% of Russia's exports.

Russian exports in 2021:

- Diesel - 0.85m bpd (120,000 tonnes per day) (3.5% of global demand)
- Petroleum naphtha and gasoline - 0.7m bpd (100,000 tonnes per day) (0.5m bpd Naphtha, 0.2m bpd gasoline)
- Fuel oil and vacuum gas oil - 1m bpd (140,000 tonnes per day)

The prices will be kept under review. The Russian government pays refiners a critical subsidy known as the "buffer mechanism" for refining oil for domestic markets varies by month between 15,000 and 30,000 rubles per metric ton ($30 to $60 per barrel) for diesel and $17 per barrel for gasoline. This keeps fuel prices low in Russia and allows refiners a small profit.

Russia charged an export duty on oil products, in May 2023 Light Oil products was $4.2 per tonne (compared to $12.9 in December 2022), Naphtha duty was $7.9 and gasoline $4.3 per tonne. From 1 January 2024 the export duty fell to zero as Russia changed the taxation system to add oil to the Mineral Extraction Tax regime.

== Alternative supply chains and intermediaries ==
Following the withdrawal of several major Western trading houses from Russian refined products markets after February 2022, trading increasingly shifted to smaller and privately-held intermediaries operating from hubs such as Dubai and Fujairah in the United Arab Emirates.

According to the Financial Times, the Fujairah oil storage and blending hub became a significant transit point. Russian-origin fuel oil was frequently blended or transferred between storage tanks before re-export to third countries, with documentation reflecting the new point of origin.

== Reactions ==
=== The EU ===
Various EU countries increased their stocks of refined oil products, especially diesel ahead of the sanction ban.

=== Russia ===
Russia is looking to try to change trade routes for their refined oil products. India and China are both exporters of oil products, so new markets needed to be found. Algeria, Brazil, Ghana, Libya, Morocco, Nigeria, Senegal, Saudi Arabia, Tunisia and the United Arab Emirates have received diesel oil products in March, some are new destinations, other have received an increased supply. Russia has increased its storage of diesel in ships, from around 1m to 4m barrels in early April 2023, tying up tankers and indicating problems in finding buyers. Land storage of diesel had also increased to over 23m barrels in December 2022.

The domestic Russian price of some oil products collapsed in 2022 as supply exceeded demand following falls in exports.

=== United States ===
In July 2025, U.S. President Donald Trump criticized India over its continued oil trade with Russia, despite ongoing Western sanctions. Trump announced that a 25% reciprocal tariff on Indian goods would go into effect on 1 August and warned of an additional, unspecified penalty in response to India's continued purchases of Russian military equipment and energy. These remarks and policy announcements were seen as a reaction to India's ongoing oil imports from Russia, which Trump suggested were indirectly funding the war in Ukraine. On 14 July 2025, Trump threatened to impose 100% tariffs and secondary sanctions on countries purchasing Russian oil if Russia did not agree to a ceasefire within 50 days. Earlier in July, U.S. Senator Lindsey Graham introduced a sanctions bill proposing tariffs of up to 500% on countries—including India and China—that continued to trade oil with Russia.

=== Clean tankers ===
Clean tankers are ones that transports finished petroleum products so as to maintain their quality.

In March 2023, following the introduction of the sanction package, the average freight rates had doubled. Tankers are needing to travel further, increasing costs per shipload and are now taking an average of 16–18 days to travel trans Atlantic, such as USA to Europe and Russia to Brazil, compared to 5–6 days to travel from Russia to Europe, increasing the shortage of available tankers. The average size of a tanker containing oil products is a third of that of a crude oil tanker, which increases costs and uses more tankers to transport oil products long distances.

In September 2023 around 33% of oil products shipped from Russia were using shadow tankers which are not owned by or use facilities provided by sanctioning nations, so are not subject to the price cap policy.

== Effect of sanctions and price cap ==
There has been no effect from the price cap sanction as prices have remained low. The restrictions on shipping facilities have had a small effect.

The main impacts of the sanctions has been the EU ban on imports, requiring Russia to sell their refined oil to distant markets.

=== February to March 2023 ===
Russian produced diesel was reported to be selling for around $75 per barrel in February. Exports by sea of Russian oil products fell 10.4% from 11.781m tons in January to 9.531m tons in February.

Albania arrested the Russian captain and seized the Liberian registered oil tanker, “Grace Felix”, trying to deliver 22,500 tons of Marine Gasoil 1000 PPM, worth Euro 40million, believed to be Russian fuel transferred ship to ship. The captain was released in December 2023 with no charges against him.

Russia has lost their EU market and has been trying to find alternate destinations for refined oil. 3m barrels of clean refined products to Central and South America, up from 1.3m, with Morocco also increasing purchases of diesel. Russia has shipped by rail 30,000 tons of diesel and other refined fuels to Iran this year, opening a new trade. Turkey increased their buying by 50% and bought 10m barrels of diesel in March.

Russia is planning on reducing refined oil output.

=== April to June 2023 ===
Russian exports of clean petroleum product (CPP) to Europe from the Baltic have fallen from over 700,000bpd to just over 100,000bpd. The products are now being shipped on longer journeys, with Turkey, Africa, Asia, Latin America and the Middle East each taking around 100,000bpd more than in 2021 or 2022 tying up clean shipping and undercutting in price of the world market for these products.

Russian exports of diesel and gasoil were down again, by 21% to 3.1m tonnes in May. Russian tax revenue on crude and oil products in May fell 31% to 425.8 billion rubles. In June refineries were processing 5.4m bpd.

=== July to September 2023 ===
In July, the European and G7 shipping industry transported 65% of Russian refined oil products. In 2023, Turkey has been buying 24% of Russian refined oil, China 12% and Saudi Arabia 10%.

In late July 2023 the price for Russian diesel, for the first time, topped the price of $100 per barrel price cap level, having risen 50% since early May. This will be seen as a test of the effectiveness of the sanctions and whether tankers previously carrying refined products for Russia will drop out of the market, tankers being paid a premium price to transport Russian refined products. In September Russia imposed a ban on the export of diesel and petrol, partially lifted in October after 3 weeks to allow seaborne exports.

In August the Monitoring Group of the Black Sea Institute of Strategic Studies identified three tankers carrying 563,843 tons, that made direct voyages from Russia to ports of EU countries carrying petroleum products, naming them Athina M who sailed to Antwerp, Janaki who unloaded in Rouen and Hamsi to Piraeus, in breach of sanctions. In September six further tankers carrying 197,858 tons were identified, Happy Lady and Hamsi to Greece, New Ranger to Spain, Mersey to Belgium, San Sebastian to Croatia and Yash to the US, breaching sanctions by sailing directly from Russia.

=== October to December 2023 ===
December saw 3.5 million tons of Russian petroleum products on 123 tankers leave the Black Sea. Storms in November 2023 saw just 2.5 million tons on 96 tankers in the Black Sea. In October 109 tankers transported 3.1 million tons of Russian petroleum products from Russian Black Sea ports, compared to 3.9 million tons on 132 tankers in September and 3.5 million tons on 133 tankers in August.

In December Russia agreed to provide OPEC+ with more data on refined oil products, Russia having previously declared such information a state secret. OPEC+ having had experienced difficulty understanding changes in production from the 30 large and 80 small refineries in Russia, which process over 5m bpd of crude.

2023 production of oil products in Russia fell 11.5% to 123 million tons, compared to 2022, attributed to sanctions and low European demand.

=== January to March 2024 ===
In January the product tanker Marlin Luanda, carrying Russian naphtha, was hit in the Gulf of Aden by a Houthi rebel missile and set on fire.

== See also ==
- 2022 Russian crude oil price cap sanctions – Economic sanction following the Russian invasion of Ukraine
- Embargo of Russian oil during the Russo-Ukrainian War
- EU natural gas price cap – Price cap imposed by EU
- International sanctions during the Russian invasion of Ukraine – Economic measures against Russia and Belarus since 2022
- Petroleum industry in Russia – One of the largest in the world
