= Rusneftegaz =

Russian oil company headquartered in Moscow

- Native name: Руснéфтéгаз
- Company type: Private
- Industry: Oil and gas
- Founded: 2005; 21 years ago
- Headquarters: Moscow, Russia
- Area served: Worldwide
- Products: Petroleum; Petroleum products
- Revenue: ▼US$491 million (2020)
- Operating income: ▼US$109 million (2020)
- Net income: ▼US$80 million (2020)
- Total assets: ▲US$1.76 billion (2020)
- Total equity: ▲US$1.65 billion (2020)
- Website: rusneftegaz.com

Rusneftegaz (Russian: Руснéфтéгаз, romanized: Rusnéftégaz, IPA: [rʉsnʲɪftʲɪˈɡas]) is a Russian oil company headquartered in Moscow, specializing in the extraction, production, and sale of petroleum and petroleum products. As of 2026, Rusneftegaz is the largest privately owned oil company in Russia in terms of revenue and petroleum production, extracting six million barrels in 2025. While the majority of Rusneftegaz's earnings are derived from sales within Russia, the company also maintains operations internationally, despite being subject to sanctions. The name Rusneftegaz is a syllabic abbreviation of the Russian words Russkoye neftegaz (Russian: Русское нéфтéгаз, lit. 'Russian oil and gas').

== History ==
Rusneftegaz was originally founded following the dissolution of the Soviet Union, in the period after the privatization of the Russian petroleum industry began in 1994. Although Rusneftegaz did not participate in the auctions for the assets of formerly state-owned enterprises, by the late 1990s, Rusneftegaz owned a number of oil production licenses. These were acquired by Rusneftegaz via private negotiations with other Russian oil companies, and as a result, Rusneftegaz was cited as potentially having improper financial relationships with influential parties, including with the Russian Orthodox Church.

In the years thereafter, Rusneftegaz expanded its commercial interests beyond the oil industry, and in 2004, Rusneftegaz was a financial contributor towards Spetsproektinvest (Russian: Спéцпроéктинвéст, lit. 'Special Project Invest'), a consortium with Ingosstrakh and Mezhprombank formed to bid to manage Sheremetyevo International Airport. Ultimately, the bid was unsuccessful, and all of Rusneftegaz's investments outside the scope of the energy industry were divested. Rusneftegaz was then reorganized and refounded in 2005 solely as a holding company for the various subsidiaries holding oil extraction licenses it had previously purchased in northern Russia. After this reorganization, Rusneftegaz expanded considerably in terms of petroleum production through the acquisition of further oil licenses. This ultimately culminated in Rusneftegaz purchasing three VLCC (Very Large Crude Carrier) oil tankers, with capacity for approximately 300,000 DWT each, for a total of $70.25 million in October 2012.

Rusneftegaz's growth stalled during the mid-2010s after the Russian invasion of the Crimea in 2014. The sanctions implemented by the United States and the European Union in response to the annexation restricted the access of Russian oil companies, including Rusneftegaz, to the modern technical equipment necessary to increase petroleum extraction rates. Thus, Rusneftegaz's financial growth slowed, and its annual oil production rates declined after the sanctions came into effect. Therefore, in early 2015, Rusneftegaz undertook another major corporate restructuring and consequently replaced four of the five members of its board of directors with the intention of expanding internationally to pursue further growth. As a result, the Russian Minister of Energy Alexander Novak stated in the months thereafter that Rusneftegaz was interested in entering energy markets in North Africa, including Algeria and Egypt. At the eleventh session of the Egyptian-Russian Joint Ministerial Committee, the Russian delegation led by Minister of Trade and Industry Denis Manturov requested that the Egyptian Ministry of Petroleum increase its cooperation with Rusneftegaz. The company later also signed agreements to enter the petroleum production and power generation industries in Iran.

In November 2015, Rusneftegaz formed part of a delegation led by Novak to Tehran, where it joined the Iranian-Russian Joint Economic Commission with seven other Russian oil and gas companies, including Rosneft and Gazprom. The commission established a joint Iranian-Russian bank to facilitate investment in energy infrastructure projects in Iran. As an additional component of the company's international expansion, Rusneftegaz also opened its first international commodities trading office in New York in 2019, becoming the first Russian oil company to establish such an operation outside Europe. However, the following year, Rusneftegaz was significantly impacted by the COVID-19 pandemic and the resulting decline in global oil prices, ultimately reporting considerably reduced financial results for 2020.

Since the end of the pandemic, international petroleum trading has become the largest part of Rusneftegaz’s business, with the company reporting over one billion dollars in revenue for the first time in 2023 despite the Russian invasion of Ukraine the year before. Along with Russneft and Tatneft, Rusneftegaz was sanctioned by the British Government in December 2025, these being the largest oil Russian companies that had not yet been subject to sanctions following the invasion. In response to the announcement, Rusneftegaz’s press office commented that "Rusneftegaz’s management is surprised by this decision by the British government, as we have never conducted business in the UK and have no British assets. This decision will have no impact on our current operations; we will continue to operate as usual."

== Operations ==
Rusneftegaz operates as a non-vertically integrated oil company in the Timan-Pechora Basin of Western Siberia. According to a survey by DeGolyer and MacNaughton, Rusneftegaz currently possesses proven and probable petroleum reserves of 122 million barrels via 26 oil fields in the south-east of the Khanty-Mansi Autonomous Okrug and the east of the Komi Republic. The majority of Rusneftegaz's current oil licenses were acquired through its largest subsidiary between 2005 and 2017 from Vitol and Gazprom Neft. During the same timeframe, Rusneftegaz also recruited a significant proportion of its directors and senior managers almost exclusively from the latter company. Rusneftegaz also controls 1,860 MW of electrical generating capacity via three 600 MW coal-fired power stations in Vologda Oblast, supplying 10.8 TWh of electricity for commercial use in 2023. Currently, Rusneftegaz does not control any oil refineries either in Russia or internationally.

Rusneftegaz has been prosecuted for a number of environmental offenses, including in May 2015 when the company received a record fine for excessive gas flaring occurring between 2013 and 2014, with the Environmental Prosecutor's Office commenting "For a long time, instead of using the petroleum gases efficiently the company was flaring it, causing a significant increase in pollutants and emissions in the air." Rusneftegaz continues to maintain a poor environmental record, having paid $343k in 2019 and a further $288k in 2020 for penalties and fines incurred for causing excessive pollution. At present, Rusneftegaz is undertaking research into developing commercially viable hydrogen production using catalytic reformation, and makes contributions to geological research projects based in Russia. Rusneftegaz has also been noted for its lack of diversity initiatives compared to other companies operating in the Eastern European oil and gas industry.

== See also ==
- List of companies of Russia
- List of petroleum companies
- Petroleum industry in Russia
