= EU natural gas price cap =

Price cap imposed by EU

As part of the sanctions imposed on the Russian Federation as a result of the Russo-Ukrainian War, on 3 December 2022, the European Union (EU) agreed to cap the price of natural gas in order to reduce the volatility created by Russia in the gas market.

In 2021 the EU imported 83% of its natural gas, but following the invasion of Ukraine gas imports from Russia have fallen, partly due to the increasing cost, partly because of reductions in supply from Russia, partly through reduction of consumption and partly because of a desire to move away from Russia's Gazprom as a supplier. The main effect on Russia, would be the desire of the EU to move quickly away from buying any gas from Russia.

The price cap would become effective from 15 February 2023 at €180 per megawatt-hour.

== Discussions on price cap proposals ==
The EU originally proposed that a gas market correction mechanism would kick in when the price of month-ahead contracts on the Dutch Title Transfer Facility (TTF) exceeded €275 per megawatt hour and the gap between world prices was greater than €58.

The Czech Republic, which holds the rotating presidency of the bloc, proposed a second compromise for a broader price cap — lowering the intervention threshold to €220. 12 member states had demanded to decrease the previously proposed price ceiling of €275. Belgium, Bulgaria, Croatia, Greece, Italy, Latvia, Lithuania, Malta, Poland, Romania, Slovakia and Slovenia, and came out in favour of lowering gas prices.

The price in December 2021 topped €180 before declining to below €100. Another peak in early March 2022 hit €220, before again declining to below €120. Between late July and late September the price was mainly above €200, with the highest in late August at €340, before declining again to below €150.

There were concerns from some that an intervention could cause greater volatility in the market.

== Price cap price ==
The European Energy ministers agreed, on 19 December 2022, on a price cap for natural Gas at €180 per megawatt-hour, with Austria and the Netherlands abstaining and Hungary voting against. This equates to about $55 per million British thermal unit.

== Gazprom gas production and exports ==
Gazprom holds the monopoly rights for gas exports via pipelines, enshrined in Russian law. In 2020, natural gas exports accounted for more than 20% of Russia's total exports by value.

Gazprom has 63% of the 377Bcm domestic market and is forced to sell at a low specified government tariff level whereas Novatek and Rosneft are free to choose their prices and can sell just in profitable areas. To compensate for falling revenue from falling exports, Russia increased the Gazprom domestic gas price by 8.5% in December 2022 and another 8% on 1 July 2023.

Natural gas 2021 (Bcm)
Quarter	production	export	Ref.
Q1 2021	135.0	52.8	
Q2 2021	125.8	47.1	
Q3 2021	117.3	45.9	
Q4 2021	136.7	39.3	
2021 Total	514.8	185.1 (Note: China 16.5Bcm, Turkey 16.0Bcm and Europe 140.0Bcm)	-22%

Natural gas 2022 (Bcm)
Quarter	production	export	Ref.
Q1 2022	135.0	38.5	
Q2 2022	103.4	30.4	
Q3 2022	74.9	18.0	
Q4 2022	99.3	14.0	
2022 Total	412.6	100.9 (Note: China 15.5Bcm, Turkey 21.6Bcm and Europe 62.0Bcm)	-45%

Natural gas 2023 (Bcm)
Quarter	production	export	Ref.
Q1 2023	117.0		
Q2 2023	62.4		
Q3 2023			
Q4 2023			
2023 Total	404.0	86.8 (Note: China 23.0Bcm, Turkey 35.5Bcm, and Europe 28.3Bcm)	-14%

Note

Sanctions do not affect the Liquefied natural gas industry in Russia (LNG). In 2021 the EU bought 10.99 million tonnes (16Bcm) of LNG from Russia, in 2022 this rose to 15.12mt (22Bcm) and in 2023 fell to 14.90mt (21.7Bcm).

== Reactions ==
=== Azerbaijan ===
Azerbaijan announced that its supply of gas to Europe would be 30% higher in 2022 than in 2021 and that an agreement had been signed in July 2022 to increase gas supplies to Europe from around 8 to 20 Bcm by 2027. Azerbaijan supplied 11.4Bcm of gas to Europe in 2022, for €15.6 billion, with 80% going to Italy.

=== Hungary ===
Hungary, which had recently signed a long-term contract with Russia, had objected to the principle of the price cap, according they were given freedom, without notification to, or consent from, the EU to keep or modify their current contract with Russia. Hungary's contract is for 4.5 bcm per annum and there is a price cap of €150 per megawatt hour.

=== Russia ===
Russian deputy prime minister Alexander Novak said that the cap on the price of gas was "just another political decision, absolutely not an economic one." Russia reported that it believed the sanction would lead to gas shortages which would destabilise Europe. To recover lost revenue, Russia increased the tax on Gazprom in 2022 reducing Gazprom's profit to 1.226 trillion roubles ($15.77 billion), Gazprom paid a dividend of 1.2 trillion roubles ($15 billion) in 2022.

In July 2023 Gazprom threatened to stop all natural gas exports through Ukraine unless Ukraine ceases court action against Gazprom. An international court established compensation at $5 billion plus accrued interest for assets located in Crimea that were taken by Russia in 2014, with a second court case of compensation for Gazprom's refusal to honour a ship-or-pay clause in its transit contract.

=== Ukraine ===
The only operational gas pipeline from Russia to the west is the Urengoy–Pomary–Uzhhorod pipeline, originating from the Urengoy gas field, it enters Ukraine at the Sudzha gas metering station. The agreement between Russia and Ukraine limits the daily gas level to 42.5mcm. Ukraine has refused to allow gas to be sent from the Sokhranovka gas pumping station through the Soyuz pipeline, declaring force majeure. Ukraine increased the price of transit fees on Russian gas to Hungary and Slovakia by 18% to $13.90 per ton from 1 January 2023. Russian gas piped through Ukraine in 2023 was 14.4bcm, with only the Sudzha, Urengoy–Pomary–Uzhhorod pipeline operational.

== Operation of sanctions ==
EU energy ministers have reached an agreement to cap gas prices in the bloc when they exceed the price cap for three days. Operational from 15 February 2023 and applying to gas contracts traded on the TTF between one month and a year ahead. Prices must also be €35 per megawatt hour above an average of global liquefied natural gas prices in order to be triggered.

The price must be above the cap price for three working days and be €35 per megawatt hour above an average of global liquefied natural gas prices. Then the cap will remain in place for 20 days, after that date it will cease if trade is then below the cap price for three working days. The EU can deactivate the cap in the event of an emergency such as a risk of loss of supplies.

The cap will not apply to private gas trades, those arranged outside energy exchanges, although there is an option to review this later, once the price cap is in force.

=== December 2022 ===
Between December 15 and December 23 natural gas prices fell €49 to €85 due to a combination of high LNG imports, high levels of storage and lower demand in Europe. At 28 December, the EU storage capacity was at 83.2% and the price of January delivery gas had fallen to €76.18pmh.

Russian gas exports to countries outside of the Commonwealth of Independent States (CIS) totaled 100.9bcm in 2022 compared to 185.1b in 2021 a fall of 45.5%. Gazprom overall production in 2022 was 413bcm, down from 515bcm in 2021 which will affect the profitability of Gazprom, who is restricted in the price it can sell gas for to the domestic market. 2022 exports to China of 15bcm generated under US$4b at a price around US$25pmh.

=== January to March 2023 ===
The warm weather in Europe continued into the new year with 4 January prices dropping to €64.20pmh. January gas supplied by Russia to Europe was 1.7b m3 compared with 13b m3 average per month for the 2021 year.

The price of natural gas in Europe fell to an 18-month low in mid February of €49pmh with gas storage across the European Union at 65% capacity, well above the average of 45% at this time of year. By 31 March the price had fallen further, to €43pmh.

Gazprom's pipeline gas exports to Europe are taxed at 30%, but have fallen 75% from pre-war levels in January on the remaining routes through Ukraine and Turkey.

=== April to June 2023 ===
The EU used 18% less gas than the 10 year average in the period October 2022 to January 2023, showing demand for gas has fallen.

In April the price of gas remains in the €40-45pmh band for future deliveries. In May they fell below €30. Gasprom expects exports of gas in 2023 to be half of 2022. Russian gas production in 2023 is expected to fall from 673bcm to 630Bcm with Gazprom production falling from 412.6Bcm to 390Bcm. 2023 Exports to Europe total just 8.14Bcm in first 4 months of 2023, with gas continuing to move through a Ukraine pipeline at 40-42mcm per day.

In May the price of gas fell to €23-25pmh band for future deliveries, a two-year low. In May, Russian deliveries via Turkstream was just 0.7 Bcm and via Ukraine 1.07 Bcm. Tax revenue from gas export tariffs fell 81% in May to 38.3 billion rubles. mineral extraction tax on gas was 106.6 billion rubles, which includes an extra monthly tax on Gazprom of 50 billion rubles per month. Overall total tax collected in May was 46% lower than May 2022. June revenue was lower at 125 billion rubles, which includes the extra monthly 50 billion tax on Gazprom.

Gazprom results for the first half of 2023 show revenue of 4.1 trillion rubles (7.0 trillion in H1 2022), expenses 3.2 trillion rubles (4.3 trillion in H1 2022), net profit 331 billion (2.6 trillion in H1 2022), net debt 5.3 trillion (36% increase since H1 2022).

=== July to December 2023 ===
Percentage of piped gas, compared to their total purchases, bought by EU countries from Russia in the period January to July 2023:

- Slovakia 88% through the Ukrainian pipeline
- Hungary 15% through Ukraine and 32% though TurkStream
- Austria 46% through Ukraine
- Slovenia 30% through Ukraine
- Romania 16% though TurkStream
- Italy and Croatia 3% each through Ukraine

The EU is well prepared for the 2023-24 winter, even under the worst weather conditions the EU will still have 20% in stored capacity by April 2024.

== See also ==
- 2021–2022 global energy crisis – Worldwide crisis affected by shortage of energy supplies
- 2022–2023 Russia–European Union gas dispute – Fossil fuel financing-related conflicts
- 2022 Russian crude oil price cap sanctions – Economic sanction following the Russian invasion of Ukraine
- 2023 Russian oil products sanctions and price cap – Economic measures following the Russian invasion of Ukraine
- International sanctions during the Russian invasion of Ukraine – Economic measures against Russia and Belarus since 2022
- Natural gas prices – Wholesale prices in the market of natural gas
