= Petroleum industry in Russia =

One of the largest in the world

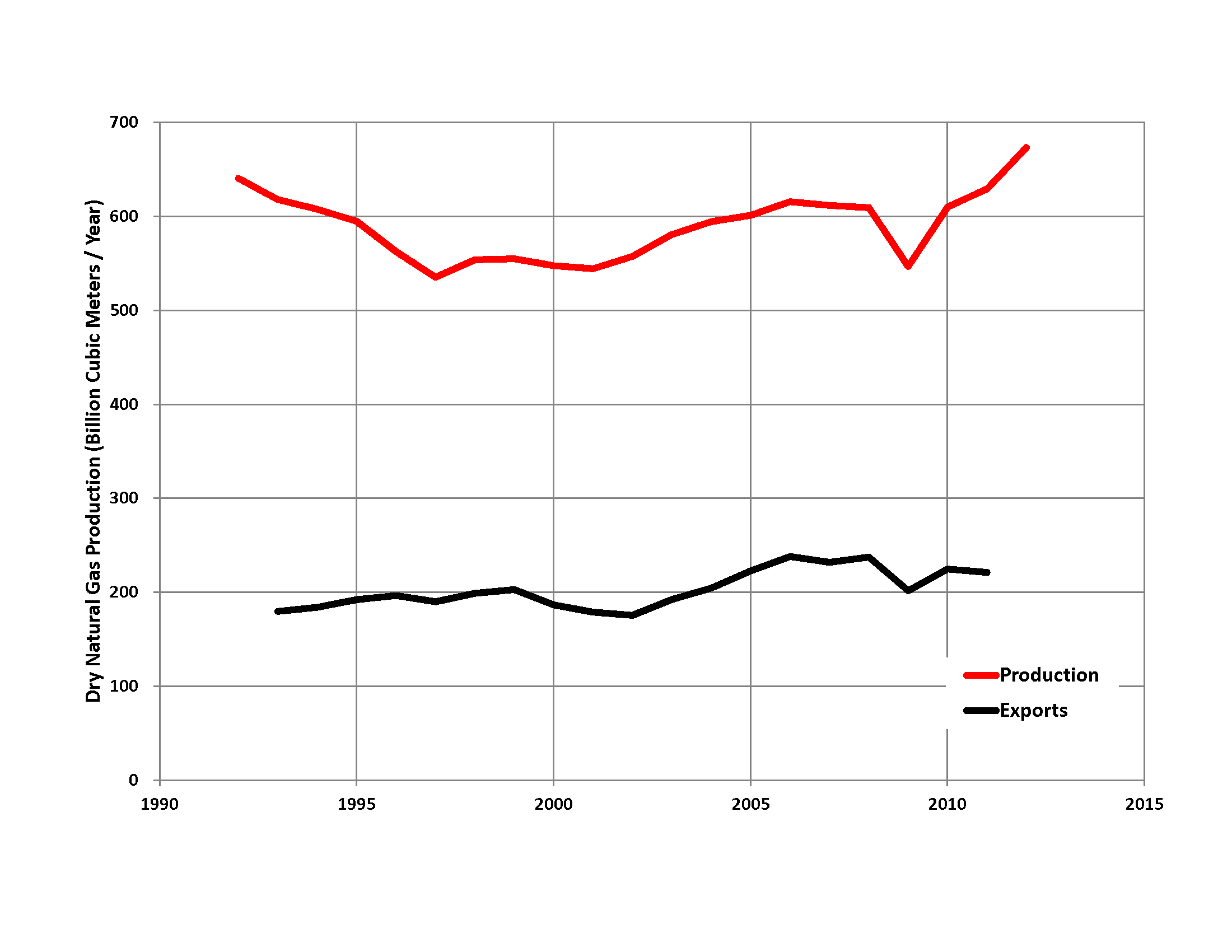
Russian natural gas production (red) and exports (black), 1993–2011

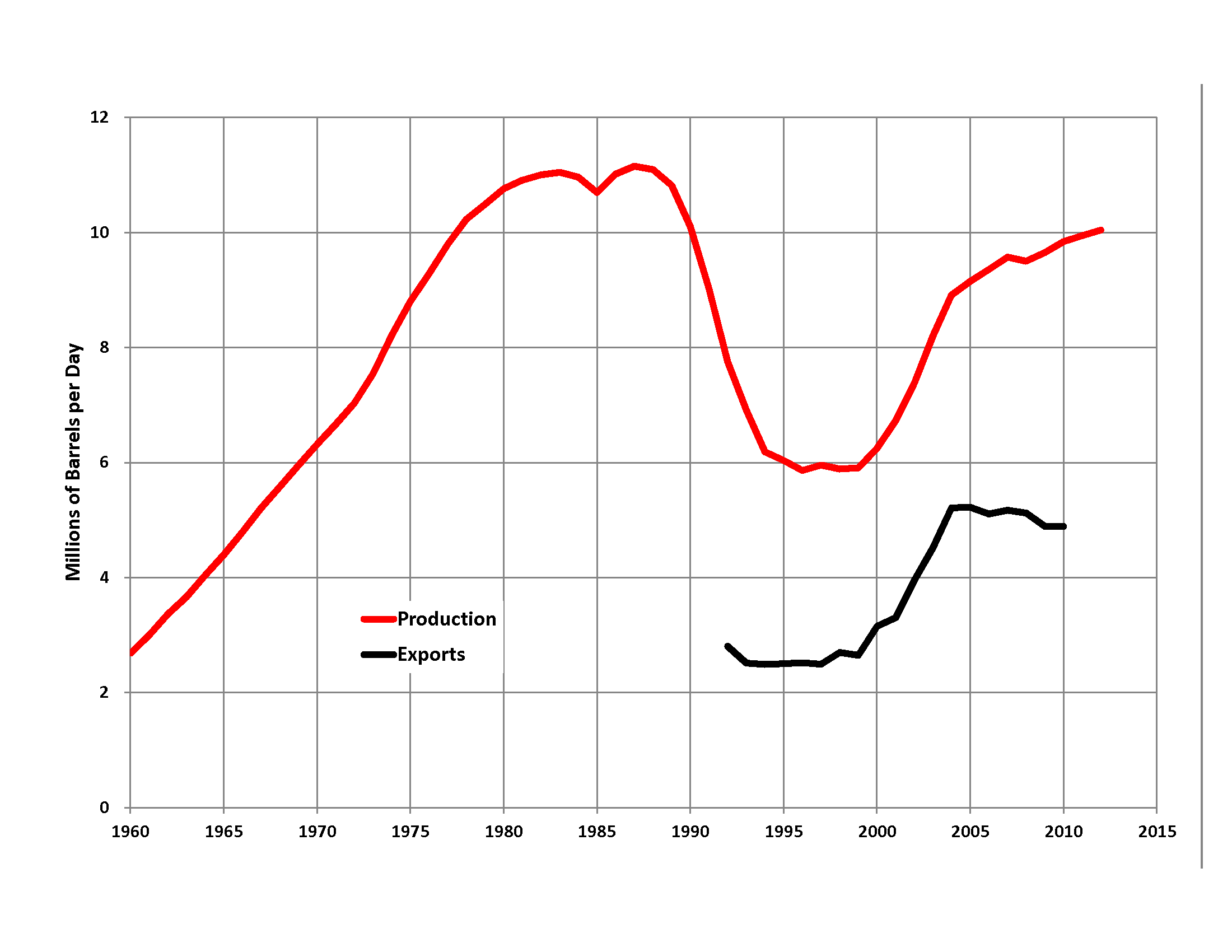
Russian crude oil production 1960–2012 (red) and crude oil exports 1992–2010 (black)

Russia's petroleum (oil) industry is one of the largest in the world. Russia has the largest reserves and was the largest exporter of natural gas in 2017. It has the sixth largest oil reserves as of 2020.

Russia is the main transit country for oil from Kazakhstan. Until 2022 Russia was by far the world's largest natural gas exporter.

== Investment ==
In 2008, the Russian oil industry claimed it was in need of huge investments.

Russia has regarded the extraction of oil and gas from the Arctic region as important, particularly for the liquefied natural gas industry in Russia. This sector received a major boost from 2017 onwards, driven by investment and tax incentives aimed mainly at Novatek. However, foreign investors pulled out in 2022 following the Russian invasion of Ukraine, and technology and key machinery essential for operations came under sanctions.

== Since 2022 ==
The Russian invasion of Ukraine started with Russia restricting gas supplies to Europe to try to stop assistance going to Ukraine. It resulted in the closure of Nord Stream 1, the refusal to activate Nord Stream 2, the closure of the pipeline through Poland and the reduction of gas in the pipeline through Ukraine. It did not succeed and gave Gasprom severe economic problems.

Sanctions were imposed by the US, the EU and other nations, to forbid or reduce the importation of gas, oil and associated products from Russia, including the introduction of a novel price cap on crude shipped oil, designed to allow Russia to maintain production but limiting the revenue from oil sales. From 5 December 2022 the price cap has been set at US$60 per barrel. This was followed in 2023 with sanctions and a price cap on Russian oil products, and the EU introduced sanctions on natural gas.

As part of the sanctions, an embargo of importing ship-borne Russian crude and refined oil was introduced by the EU, G7 countries and Australia beginning in December 2022, with a few exceptions for a limited time period.

In May 2023 Lukoil completed the sale of its Priolo Gargallo refinery in Sicily, as it was no longer able to import Russian crude oil and the plant was configured to only process the Russian Ural grade oil. In October 2023 Bulgaria attempted to force Lukoil to sell its Lukoil Neftohim Burgas refinery.

A US Treasury report in May 2023 highlighted that Russian oil exports were continuing to rise, providing stability in the world market, as planned, whilst Russia's revenue was being restrained by the price cap to $5–6 billion per month, compared with $8–15 billion a month in 2022. Russia has changed their tax rules to levy more tax on oil producers to help offset falling revenue, to the detriment of investment. Market participants and geopolitical analysts now acknowledge that the price cap is accomplishing both of its goals.

Gas production in Russia has fallen, as gas exports which in 2021 were 185 bcm, have fallen in 2023 by around 70% with the loss of the European market.

Russia has sought means to get around the sanctions including investing heavily in hundreds of old tankers, to transport crude oil to new markets in the Far East, especially China and India, to replace lost European markets. G7 sanctions keep being adapted to restrict Russia's options and keep Russia's revenues below the $60 per barrel price cap level for crude oil whilst keeping the oil flowing.

In December 2023 the Russian government ordered oil and gas producers to install anti-drone protection at their installations, to ward off Ukrainian drone attacks. In January 2024, Ukrainian drone strikes hit at least four oil and gas terminals across Russia, including the Tuapse oil terminal on the Black Sea coast and the Ust-Luga oil terminal on the Baltic Sea coast. Ukrainian journalist Illia Ponomarenko said that "Russia finances its military from oil exports. You can't persuade countries like India and China to stop buying it. So you knock out Russian oil refineries."

Transneft, which pumps 90% of Russian oil, reported that 2023 crude oil exports were:

- China via pipeline 40 million tons; no change
- Black Sea via tankers 30m tons; +3.1%
- Baltic Primorsk via tankers 44.4m tons; +6.5%
- Baltic Ust-Luga via tankers 34m tons; +9.0%
- Pacific Kozmino via tankers 42.8m tons; +9.4%
- Druzhba pipeline to Europe 10m tons; -60.0%

Overall exports were down 6.5% in 2023 and over 90% of sales went to China and India.

In March 2025, U.S. President Donald Trump threatened "secondary sanctions" on imports from countries buying Russian oil, saying: "That would be that if you buy oil from Russia, you can't do business in the United States. There will be a 25 percent tariff on all oil, a 25 to 50-point tariff on all oil." In June 2025, a majority of US senators supported secondary sanctions against Russia that would impose 500% tariffs on countries purchasing Russian oil, gas, uranium, and other export goods.

=== 2025–2026 crisis ===
Following historically high domestic prices on gasoline and in a bid to support summer travel and grain harvesting, Russia imposed an export ban on gasoline for August and September 2025.

In August 2025 Ukraine intensified their attacks on Russia's oil industry, striking at least seven oil refineries, including at Novokuibyshevsk, Syzran, Ryazan and Volgograd, reducing Russia's refining capacity by an estimated 13%. Two oil pumping stations of the Druzhba pipeline were also struck, interrupting its operation. An oil depot near Sochi airport and fuel trains close to the front lines were struck as well.

By 28 August 2025 Ukraine's campaign to strike at Russia's petroleum industry had hit ten oil refineries and was estimated by Reuters to have disrupted Russia's refinery capacity by at least 17% or 1.1 million barrels a day. The effect was a fuel crisis in Crimea and in southern and far eastern regions with price surges and dry gas stations. In September 2025 the International Energy Agency stated that Russia's revenues from oil product exports had in August declined to five-year lows, contributing to Russia's economic slowdown. Acknowledging Russia's strained energy system president Vladimir Putin pointed to Russia's coal reserves to offset its gas shortage, insufficient infrastructure and under-developed grid economy.

Following an attack on the Tuapse oil terminal in early November 2025 the Kyiv Post cited a source in the Security Service of Ukraine for a claim that the attacks on Russia's petroleum industry is a deliberate effort to reduce Russia's income from oil exports that contributes to funding its war in Ukraine.

By 25 March 2026 Reuters calculated that 40% of Russia's capacity for export of crude oil was shut down due to intensified Ukrainian attacks on all three of Russia's western oil export ports, namely Primorsk and Ust-Luga on the Baltic Sea and the port of Novorossiysk on the Black Sea, as well as on the overland Druzhba pipeline.

On 27 March 2026 Russia's government banned export of gasoline effective as of 1 April with the ban expected to last until 31 July.

== Russia's oil refineries ==
As of 2025 about 40% of refineries have been disabled by war damage.

Major oil refineries in Russia

== Russia's oil and gas companies ==
The biggest Russian oil company is Rosneft followed by Lukoil, Surgutneftegaz, Gazprom Neft and Tatneft. All oil trunk pipelines (except Caspian Pipeline Consortium) are owned and operated by the state-owned monopoly Transneft and oil products pipelines are owned and operated by its subsidiary Transnefteproduct.

- Bashneft (Russian oil refining company, one of the largest producers of oil in the country)
- Gazprom (Russia's state-run natural gas monopoly)
- Gazprom Neft oil company, subsidiary of Gazprom
- Itera
- Lukoil
- Northgas
- Novatek
- Rosneft (State-owned Russian oil and gas exploration company)
- Rusneftegaz
- Russneft
- Surgutneftegas
- Tatneft
- Transneft (Russia's pipeline monopoly)

== See also ==
- 2022 Russian oil price cap
- Economy of Russia
- Energy in Russia
- Energy policy of Russia
- Energy policy of the Soviet Union
- Global warming in Russia
- Oil reserves in Russia
- Russia in the European energy sector
