= Vladyslav Vlasiuk =

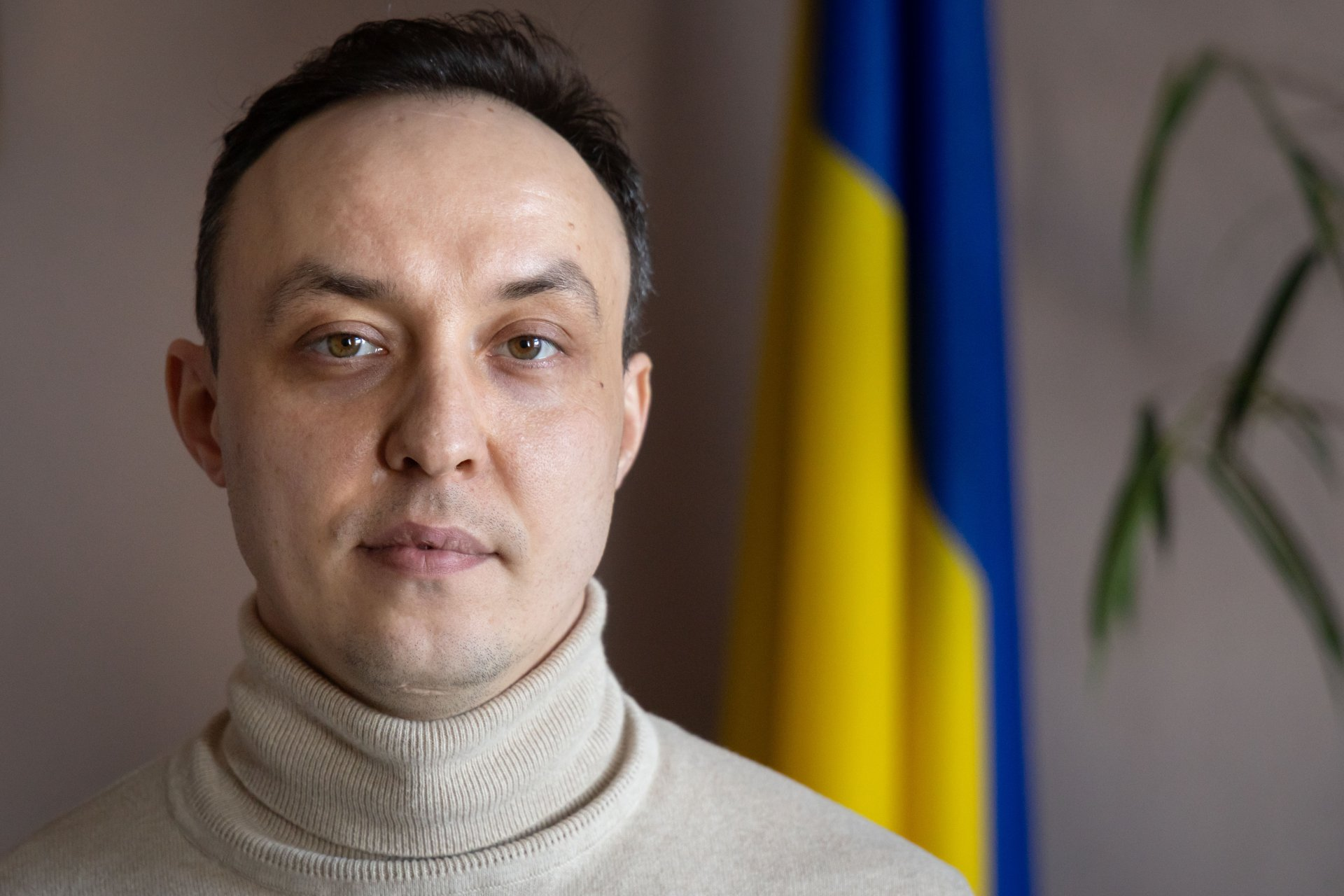
- Born: February 25, 1989 (age 37); Vinnytsia, Ukraine
- Education: Queen Mary University of London, Taras Shevchenko National University of Kyiv
- Occupations: Lawyer, Government Official
- Known for: Advisor on sanctions policy
- Title: Sanctions Policy Commissioner
- Relatives: Vitalii Vlasyuk (brother)

Vladyslav Vlasiuk (born 25 February 1989) is the Presidential Commissioner for Sanctions Policy of Ukraine and a Ukrainian expert on sanctions who represents the Ukrainian government in international sanctions coordination with partner countries.

Working together with government institutions, civil society organisations and expert communities, Vlasiuk contributes to the development of sanctions proposals against Russia. These proposals are reviewed by an interagency working group and later submitted to the National Security and Defence Council of Ukraine for approval. International sanctions initiatives are coordinated with sanctions representatives of partner countries.

According to Ukrainian officials, the economic losses to Russia resulting from sanctions initiatives promoted by Ukraine since beginning of the Russian invasion of Ukraine have been estimated at $700 billion.

Vlasiuk serves as secretary for the Yermak-McFaul Expert Group on Russian Sanctions, a team of international experts implementing sanctions against Russia and Belarus in response to the invasion of Ukraine. Additionally, he is the first deputy head of Task Force Ukraine at the Office of the Prosecutor General, focusing on prosecuting individuals involved in the aggression against Ukraine and seizing Russian assets.

In 2015 Vlasiuk participated in the reform of the National Police of Ukraine. In 2017–19, he implemented the “I Have a Right!” legal awareness campaign and anti-raiding reforms at the Ministry of Justice of Ukraine.

== Early life and education ==
Vladyslav Vlasiuk was born on 25 February 1989 in Vinnytsia, Ukraine. Went to a school specialized in Math and Physics (17th gymnasium, then 7th Lyceum). Winner and participant at many students competitions.

He studied law at the Taras Shevchenko National University of Kyiv, receiving a master's degree in law in 2012. In 2014, he completed a master's programme at Queen Mary University of London, focusing on international investment arbitration, corporate finance and international energy law.

== Career ==
From 2010 to 2012, Vlasiuk worked as an assistant to lawyer Oleksiy Bonyuk, later collaborating with him on projects related to the Ministry of Justice. He obtained an attorney's licence in 2012 and became a managing partner of the law firm YePravo (Ukr. єПраво).

In 2014, he joined the Public Council of the Ministry of Energy and Coal Industry of Ukraine, representing the Association of Lawyers of Ukraine and serving as the head of the legal commission. In October and November of the same year, Vlasiuk completed an internship at the Clifford Chance LLP law firm in London, focusing on international corporate law.

From 2015 to 2016, Vlasiuk worked within the National Police of Ukraine, including as a criminal law instructor for patrol officers and later as Deputy Head of the Patrol Police Department. In late 2015, he served briefly as Chief of Staff to the Head of the National Police and later headed an administrative practice unit within the Patrol Police Department.

He is a co-founder of a number of non-governmental organizations, including LEAD office, Office of Professional Support for Recovery, Lawyers for Ecology, StopBullying Lawyers' Initiative, and the Association for the Development of Artificial Intelligence.

In 2017, he became Director of the Directorate for Human Rights and Access to Justice at the Ministry of Justice, overseeing legal awareness initiatives and anti-raiding measures, and chaired the Ministry's Anti-Raiding Commission. He held the position until 2019.

In 2019, he served as Director of the Department of Notary and Registration at the Ministry of Justice. From 2021 to March 2022, Vlasiuk was an adviser to the Minister of Agrarian Policy and Food, coordinating work with the State Fisheries Agency and international cooperation.

In March 2022, he became an adviser at the Office of the President of Ukraine and later served as First Deputy Head of Task Force UA, an interagency team focused on identifying and seizing assets of individuals involved in Russia's aggression against Ukraine.

In July 2023, Vlasiuk joined the supervisory board of Sense Bank (formerly Alfa-Bank) following its nationalization.

=== Sanctions policy assessment ===
In 2022, Vlasiuk was appointed Secretary of the International Working Group on Sanctions against Russia, known as the Yermak–McFaul Expert Group on Russian Sanctions. The group, led by Presidential Chief of Staff Andriy Yermak and former U.S. National Security Advisor Michael McFaul, coordinates international proposals for strengthening sanctions against Russia.

Since August 2024, Vlasiuk has served as Advisor to President Volodymyr Zelenskyy and Presidential Commissioner for Sanctions Policy, focusing on the development and implementation of Ukraine's sanctions strategy.

Vlasiuk frequently comments on the impact of Western sanctions in international media. He has argued that sanctions enforcement and the closing of loopholes are key to maintaining pressure on the Russian economy. Vlasiuk estimates that sanctions have significantly affected Russia's economy, causing a 10% inflation increase in 2024, labor shortages, and a 60% rise in government spending. He has also pointed to continued supply of foreign-made components used in Russian weapons systems as evidence of sanctions evasion and enforcement gaps.

In a 2025 interview with ''Politico Europe'', Vlasiuk stated that sanctions relief could only be considered as part of a broader peace settlement with security guarantees for Ukraine. Following Russian missile strikes in October 2022, he called for Russia to be removed from the Financial Action Task Force (FATF) and supported efforts to designate Russia as a state sponsor of terrorism.
