= Tripp of Dordrecht =

Dutch Merchant family

The Tripp family of Dordrecht were Dutch merchants who traded extensively in the Middle East, Russia and Scandinavia.
