= Laconian Gulf =

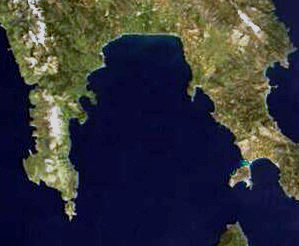
- Satellite image of the Laconian Gulf

- Location of the Laconian Gulf within Greece
- Location: Southeast Europe
- Coordinates: 36°35′N 22°40′E
- Type: Gulf
- Primary inflows: Mediterranean Sea
- Basin countries: Greece
- Max. length: 44 km (27 mi)
- Max. width: 58 km (36 mi) (min)

The Laconian Gulf (Greek: Λακωνικός Κόλπος, romanized: Lakonikos Kolpos), is a gulf in the south-eastern Peloponnese, in Greece. It is the southernmost gulf in Greece and the largest in the Peloponnese.

In the shape of an inverted "U", it is approximately 58 km (36 mi) wide east to west, and 44 km (27 mi) long north to south. It is bounded to the west by the Mani peninsula, which separates it from the Messenian Gulf, and to the east by the Cape Maleas peninsula (also known as the Epidavros Limira peninsula), which separates it from the Aegean Sea. To the south it opens onto the Mediterranean Sea. The Mani and Cape Maleas peninsulas are dry and rocky, but the northern shore, fed by the Evrotas River, which empties into the gulf at its apex, is fertile farmland. The island of Elafonissos lies in the Laconian Gulf, with the island of Kythira directly to the south. The main ports and settlements on the gulf are Gytheio and Neapolis.

== STS transfers ==
The Laconian Gulf gained notoriety in the early years after the 2022 Russian invasion of Ukraine because Russia used it regularly to conduct ship-to-ship (STS) transfers of oil by its Ghost Fleet. The preferred location for STS transfers had been until then the Messenian Gulf but that changed when the government in 2021 extended its territorial waters 12 miles into that Gulf.

In June 2023 a detailed study was published by Geollect on STS transfers by Russian vessels.

In April 2024 a meticulous study followed the MV Ligera as it received from the MV Nautilus a shipment of oil from the Baltic Port of Ust-Luga, and then a shipment of oil on MV Blue from the Port of Novorossyisk on the Black Sea.

In early May 2024 the Russian "base" had moved south to the western shore of Kythira. The Greek navy had exercised nearby in the same waters and this sent a signal that the Russians were unwelcome in the Laconian Gulf, but by 20 May at least seven tankers returned when the Navy exercises ended. By June 2024 the practice had subsided there and moved to offshore Morocco, near the city of Nador at the eastern end of mediterranean Morocco, but another report had this oil originating in Primorsk.
