= Irina Slavina (journalist) =

Russian journalist (1973–2020)

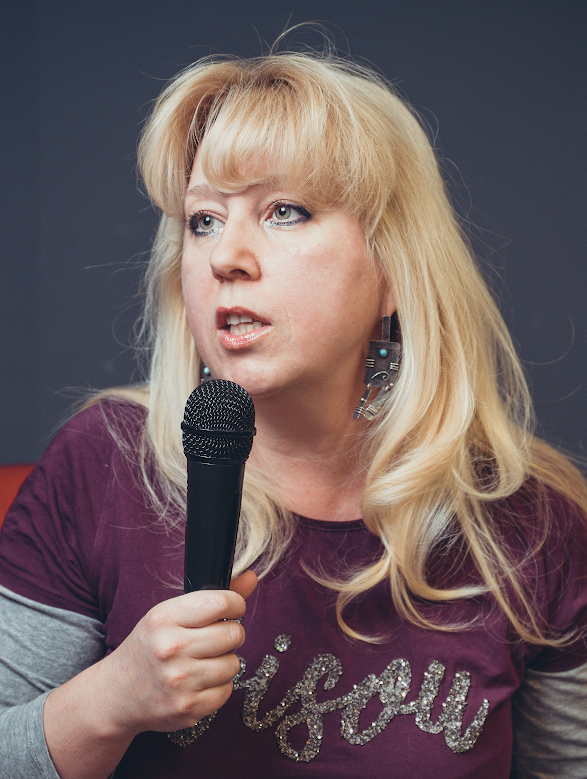
- Slavina in 2019
- Born: Irina Vyacheslavovna Murakhtaeva Kolebanova; 8 January 1973; Gorky, Russian SFSR, Soviet Union
- Died: 2 October 2020 (aged 47); Nizhny Novgorod, Russia
- Cause of death: Suicide by self-immolation
- Children: 2

Irina Vyacheslavovna Murakhtaeva (Russian: Ирина Вячеславовна Мурахтаева; née Kolebanova; 8 January 1973 – 2 October 2020), known professionally as Irina Slavina, was a Russian journalist from Nizhny Novgorod city, public and political figure, and editor-in-chief of the Koza Press.

On 2 October 2020, Irina Slavina died through self-immolation in front of the building of the Main Directorate of the Ministry of Internal Affairs of Russia for the Nizhny Novgorod Oblast (opposite the Gorkovskaya metro station).

== Biography ==
Irina Vyacheslavovna Kolebanova was born in Gorky (now Nizhny Novgorod), USSR on 8 January 1973.

Slavina graduated from Nizhny Novgorod State Pedagogical University in 1997. From 1995 to 2003, she worked as a teacher of Russian language and Russian Literature at the schools of Nizhny Novgorod. Also, she studied journalism from the University of the Russian Academy of Education (URAO), and from 2003 she became a journalist.

== Social activity ==
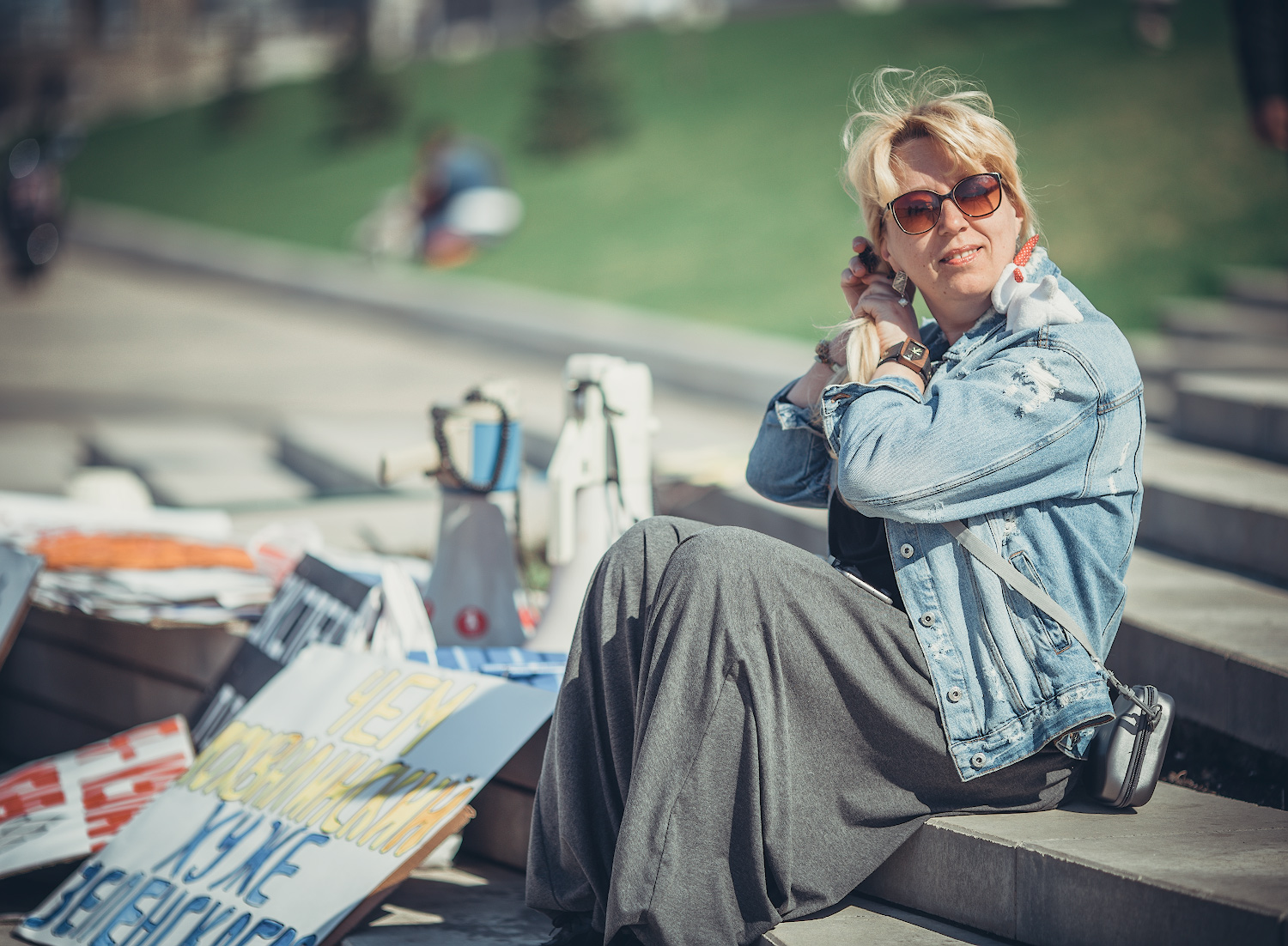
Irina Slavina protesting in 2019

According to Current Time TV, in March 2019, a court in Nizhny Novgorod fined Slavina 20 thousand rubles, finding her guilty of organizing an uncoordinated march in memory of Boris Nemtsov. In the fall of 2019, the court of Nizhny Novgorod fined Slavina 70 thousand rubles under the article on disrespect for the authorities and society (part 3 of article 20.1 of the Administrative Code). According to a statement from representatives of the Nizhny Novgorod branch of the Communist Party of the Russian Federation, a case was opened against Slavina for the post to the Investigative Committee of Russia: "After Stalin's face was hung on the house in Nizhny Novgorod, it is proposed to rename the settlement to Shakhuynya". The head of the Agora human rights group, Pavel Chikov, draws attention to the fact that Slavina was fined the largest possible under the article on disrespect for the authorities. Colleagues and acquaintances of the journalist suggest that this was done in order to close down the publication that occupies an opposition position.

According to MBH Media, in June 2020, a protocol on fake news was drawn up against Slavina (part 9, article 13.15 of the Administrative Code) because of the material that one of the heads of the Sambo Academy in the town of Kstovo contracted the SARS-CoV-2 and returning from Europe, he contacted dozens of people, including visitors to the academy. The law enforcers considered that Slavina spread deliberately false information under the guise of reliability.

In August 2019, a memorial plaque in memory of Joseph Stalin was installed in Shakhunya – to the 140th anniversary of his birth. Slavina, in her post on Facebook, suggested renaming Shakhunya, changing the last few letters in the name of the settlement, so that the result was an obscene word. In October 2019, the Centre E of the Ministry of Internal Affairs of Russia opened an administrative case of disrespect for the authorities and society (part 3 of Article 20.1 of the Administrative Code) against Slavina (Murakhtaeva), editor-in-chief of the Koza Press online publication. In June 2020, an administrative protocol was drawn up against Slavina on the dissemination of deliberately false information (part 9 of article 13.15 of the Administrative Code of the Russian Federation) for posting information about COVID-19.

In July 2020, Slavina was fined for posting information about the Free People forum.

== Political activity ==
In June 2016, together with Askhat Kayumov and Andrei Khomov, Slavina headed the list of the Yabloko party in the elections to the Legislative Assembly of Nizhny Novgorod Oblast.

In 2016, as a candidate from the Yabloko party, she took part in the elections to the State Duma of the Russian Federation in the Prioksky single-mandate district of the Nizhny Novgorod Oblast and took 8th place out of 10, gaining 3,468 votes or 1.28%.

== Journalistic activities ==
Irina Murakhtaeva used the creative pseudonym Irina Slavina for her journalistic activities.

From 2003 to 2011 she was a journalist in Nizhegorodskaya Pravda, the official newspaper of the Government of Nizhny Novgorod Oblast.

In 2015, she founded and headed, as editor-in-chief, the independent online newspaper "Koza Press", covering the social and political events and problems of the Nizhny Novgorod Oblast.

== Self-immolation ==
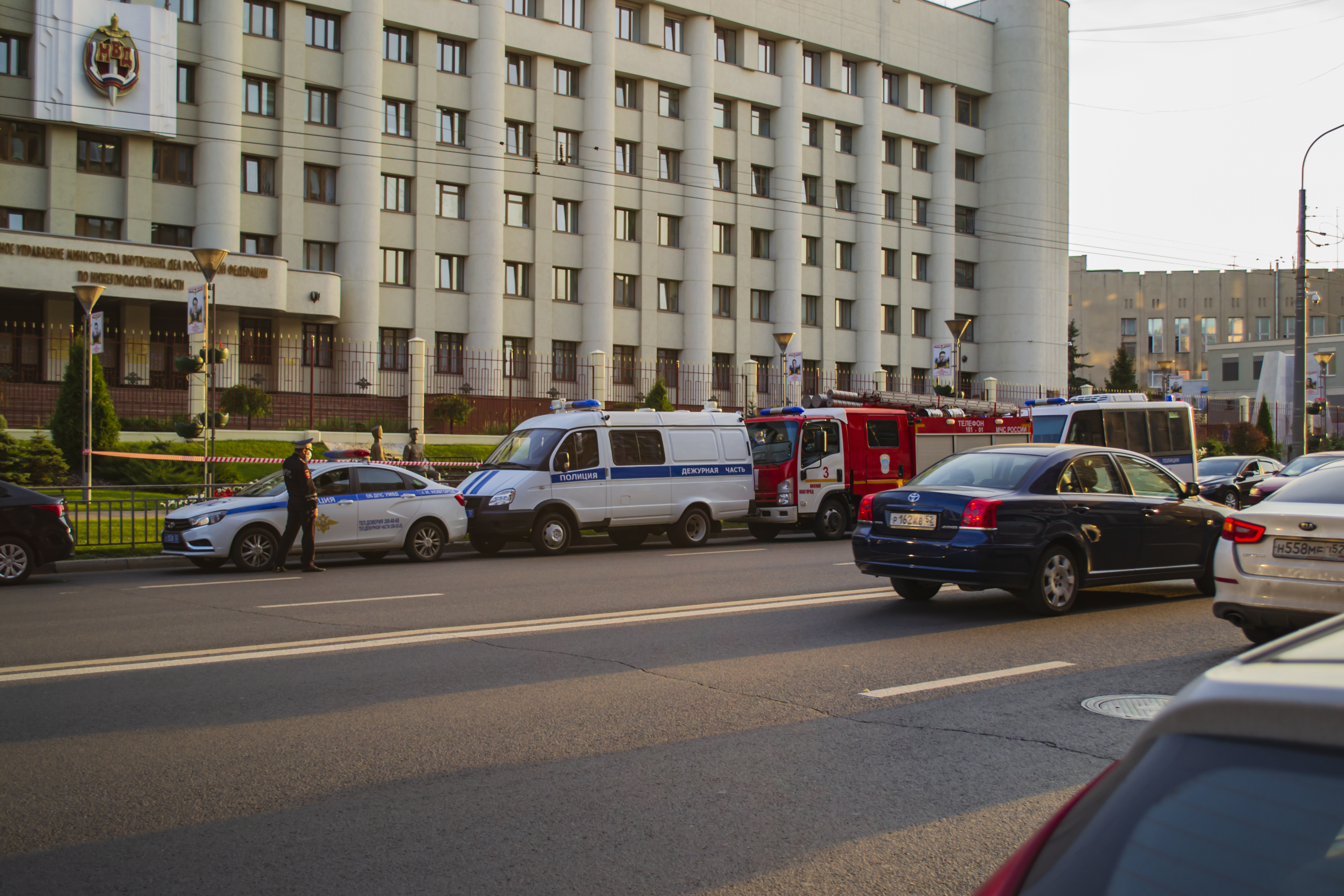
Emergency vehicles near the headquarters of the Nizhny Novgorod police

On 2 October 2020, at 15:30 (UTC +3), Slavina died through self-immolation in front of the building of the Nizhny Novgorod Oblast Police. In her last post on Facebook, Slavina asked "the Russian Federation to be blamed for her death".

The day before, Slavina's house was searched as part of a criminal case under the article on the activities of an undesirable organization (Article 284.1 of the Criminal Code of the Russian Federation), which was initiated against Mikhail Iosilevich. The security forces took away the electronic equipment from Slavina, then the journalist was taken for interrogation. Following the raid, Slavina wrote "They were looking for brochures, leaflets, invoices of Open Russia, possibly an icon with the face of Mikhail Khodorkovsky... I don't have any of this", and that they seized "flash drives, my laptop, my daughter's laptop, the computer, phones — not just mine, but also my husband's — a bunch of my notebooks that I scribbled on during press conferences. I'm left without the means of production".

=== Reactions ===
A meeting in memory of Irina Slavina took place in the city. Slavina's self-immolation attracted the attention of both the Russian and foreign press. Observers note that the persecution of independent journalists in Russia is associated with the desire of the authorities to protect themselves from criticism. Soon after the publication of the news of the death of Slavina, her website was closed.

Local Russian authorities publicly stated there was "no basis" to connect her death to police raids and stated that she was only a witness, and not a suspect, in the probe.

Opposition leader Alexei Navalny stated "A criminal case was fabricated against Irina Slavina under a political charge. Yesterday, her home was searched, doors were cut out and computers confiscated... They absolutely drove her to suicide." Kremlin critic Ilya Yashin stated "All of these cases of police amusing themselves, these shows of men in masks – these are not games. The government is truly breaking people psychologically."

== Personal life ==
Slavina was married and had a daughter Margarita and a son Vyacheslav.
