= Anastasia Shevchenko =

Russian public figure and civil activist

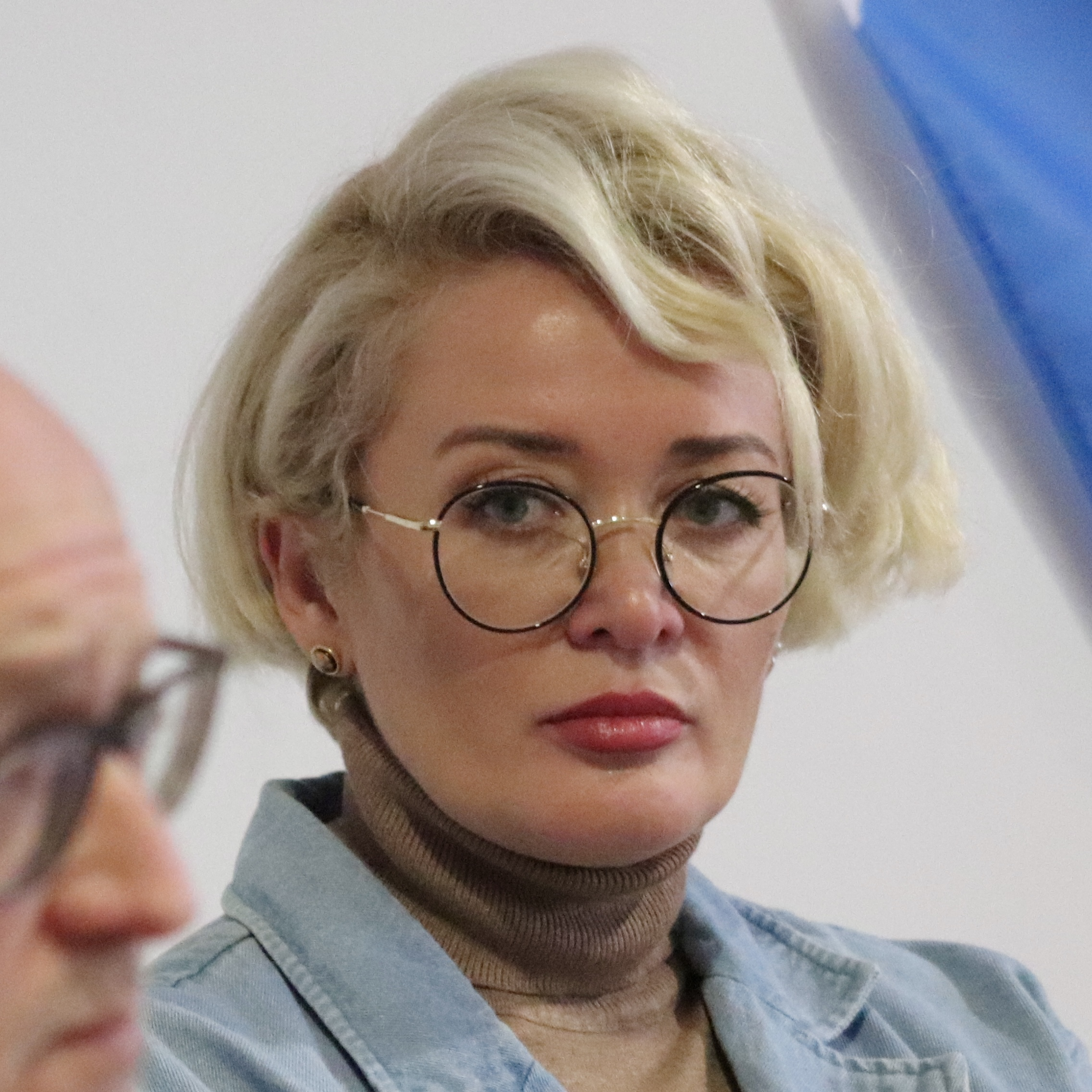
- Anastasia Shevchenko
- Born: 23 October 1979 (age 47); Dzhida, Republic of Buryatia, Russian SFSR, Soviet Union

Anastasia Nukzarievna Shevchenko (Russian: Анастасия Нукзариевна Шевченко; born 23 October 1979) is a Russian public figure and civil activist. She is the first person in Russia to have a criminal case brought against her on charges of participating in an "undesirable" organisation under Russian law. She was recognised as a political prisoner and a prisoner of conscience.

On 18 February 2021 Shevchenko was found guilty and received a suspended sentence of 4 years of imprisonment(later it was reduced to 3 years). In August 2022 Shevchenko informed that she had left Russia and moved to Vilnius. After that she was declared a fugitive for "evading the punishment".

== Biography ==
Anastasia Shevchenko's father, Nugzari Sukhitashvili, was a Georgian who served in the Soviet military and her mother, Tamara Gryaznova, taught Russian language and literature. Shevchenko was born in the village of Dzhida in the Dzhidinsky district of Buryatia. She met her future husband, Alexander Shevchenko in Jida and graduated from the Irkutsk State Linguistic University with the highest award. She and her family moved to the village of Egorlykskaya in the Rostov region after her eldest daughter, Alina, was born. Her second daughter, Vlada, and son, Misha, were born there. Shevchenko started to work for the local news as a journalist and was a member of the Communist Party of the Russian Federation for some time. On 5 November 2010, during the massacre in the village of Kuschevskaya, Shevchenko's friend Vladimir Mironenko and his family were brutally murdered. After her son was born, Shevchenko left with her husband and got involved in civil activism.

Over the years, Shevchenko worked as the head of the television broadcasting department for MUP RT Zarya and as the senior inspector of the organisational and territorial division of the Election Commission for the Rostov region.

From 2017 to February 2018, she was the coordinator of the Rostov branch of the Open Russia Movement. During the presidential elections in 2018, Anastasia Shevchenko headed the regional headquarters of Ksenia Sobchak's campaign and headed the regional branch of the Civil Initiative Party. Shevchenko was elected to the Federal Council of the Open Russia Movement at the Movement's annual conference on 25 March 2018. In January 2018, Anastasia Shevchenko was detained for putting up election ads in support of Sobchak.

In June 2018, she became one of the authors and activists campaigning against the pension reform which was entitled "They’ve stolen everything but our underpants".

== Criminal case ==
On 26 April 2017, the Prosecutor General's Office of Russia recognized the following organisations as "undesirable": Open Russia, the Open Russia Civic Movement (registered in the UK), the Institute of Modern Russia (headed by Mikhail Khodorkovsky's son Pavel in the US). According to the authorities, all three organizations were involved in the implementation of "special programs and projects aimed at discrediting the results of the Russian elections, at seeing the results thereof recognised illegitimate" and "encouraging protest speeches and destabilizing the domestic political situation, which poses a threat to the foundations of the constitutional structure of the Russian Federation and the security of the state". In May of the same year, the Russian Ministry of Justice told reporters at a press briefing that the work of the Russian Open Russia Movement will not be conflated with the work of the British organisations that had been recognised as "undesirable".

In January 2019, the authorities conducted searches against Open Russia activists in Pskov, Kazan, Rostov-on-Don, and Ulyanovsk. On 21 January they searched Anastasia Shevchenko's house. She was detained shortly afterwards. Shevchenko was kept in a pre-trial detention facility for 48 hours until her court hearing. On 23 January she was placed under house arrest by the Leninsky District Court of Rostov-on-Don. On 29 January, the Rostov Regional Court upheld the lower court's decision to place her under house arrest.

On 31 January, Shevchenko's eldest daughter, Alina, died in Zverev City Hospital. She was taken into the intensive care unit two days earlier and the investigator only allowed Shevchenko to visit her a few hours before she died. On 1 February, Dmitry Peskov, press secretary to President Vladimir Putin, expressed his condolences at the death of Shevchenko's daughter. On 24 January Human Rights Watch condemned persecution of Shevchenko and violation of her right to freedom of expression and association. On 25 January Memorial recognized Shevchenko as a prisoner of conscience. On 7 February, members of the Presidential Human Rights Council (HRC) and a number of human rights defenders came out in support of Anastasia Shevchenko and Vyacheslav Egorov. On the same day, the US Mission to the OSCE expressed concerns over her prosecution. On 8 February, the Memorial Human Rights Center, Russia's oldest human rights organization, recognized Anastasia Shevchenko as a victim of political persecution and a political prisoner. On 21 February, 12 human rights organisations signed a statement calling for the release of Anastasia Shevchenko as well as other political prisoners in Russia. Two US senators also published a statement condemning the Kremlin's persecution of Anastasia Shevchenko.

On 15 March, the Leninsky District Court of Rostov-on-Don extended Shevchenko's house arrest until 17 June 2019. The court also rejected the appeals made by Shevchenko's defense to soften the terms of her house arrest.

On 18 February 2021 Shevchenko was found guilty and received a suspended sentence of 4 years of imprisonment(later it was reduced to 3 years).

== Emigration ==
In August 2022 Shevchenko informed that she had left Russia and moved to Vilnius. Since settling in Vilnius, she has continued her work as a human rights advocate and public speaker.

After this, the criminal-executive inspectorate transferred the materials to the Ministry of Internal Affairs, since Shevchenko “evaded the execution of the punishment assigned to her,” and she was put on the wanted list..

In December 2022, the court in absentia changed her sentence to 3 years in prison..

In 2023 she participated in the Geneva Summit for Human Rights and Democracy, and in 2024 she was a featured speaker at the Oslo Freedom Forum, where she condemned political repression in Russia and the invasion of Ukraine. Shevchenko continues to advocate for Russian civil society from exile, emphasizing the need for Russians to take responsibility for ending state violence and the war against Ukraine. In 2025 she appeared at the ArtsLink Assembly “Beyond Greener Grass” in Lviv, contributing to dialogues on cultural resilience and solidarity among displaced artists and activists from Ukraine and Eastern Europe.

On February 7, 2025, the Ministry of Justice of Russia was added to the list of individuals “foreign agents”.

On May 6, 2025, Anastasia Shevchenko was listed in the Rosfinmonitoring List of Terrorists and Extremists as a terrorist.

== Rallies in support of Shevchenko ==
On 1 February 2019, protests began in support of Anastasia Shevchenko. The first demonstration took place in Rostov-on-Don. On 10 February a series of rallies in support of Shevchenko took place under the banner "Mothers' Fury" in Moscow, St. Petersburg, Yekaterinburg, Kazan, Yaroslavl, Ivanovo and Tambov and protestors in Moscow and St Petersburg were arrested. On 24 February, during a march in Moscow in memory of Boris Nemtsov a separate column developed that demanded an end to the criminal prosecution of civil and political activists, including Anastasia Shevchenko.

On 31 March 2019, the Open Russia Conference put out a statement demanding an end to the criminal prosecution of Anastasia Shevchenko. On the same day, the Movement announced its liquidation to protect its activists from criminal prosecution.
