= Nizhny Novgorod Oblast Police =

Regional police force in Russia

Nizhny Novgorod Oblast Police Нижегородская полиция
- Emblem of the Nizhny Novgorod Oblast Police

Agency overview
- Formed: 4 May [O.S. 23 April] 1733

Jurisdictional structure
- Legal jurisdiction: Nizhny Novgorod Oblast
- General nature: Civilian police

Operational structure
- Headquarters: 603134, Gorky Street 71, Nizhny Novgorod, Russia
- Minister responsible: Vladimir Kolokoltsev, Minister of Internal Affairs
- Agency executives: Yuri Arsentiev, Chief; Oleg Sokolov (acting), Chief of Nizhny Novgorod City Police
- Parent agency: Ministry of Internal Affairs

Website
- 52.mvd.ru

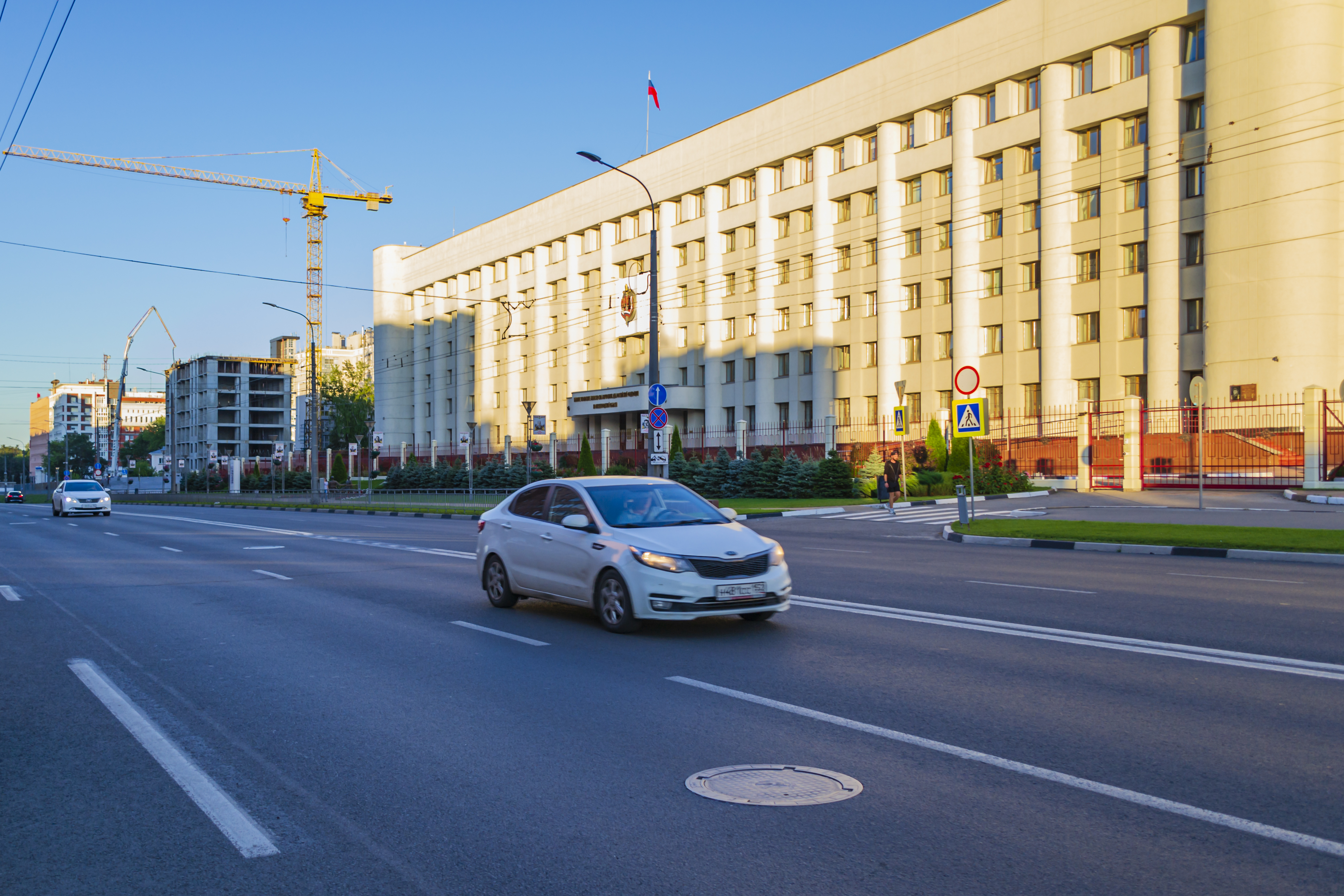
Nizhny Novgorod Oblast Police headquarters in Nizhny Novgorod.

Nizhny Novgorod Oblast Police (Note: The official name is the Main Directorate of the Ministry of Internal Affairs of Russia for Nizhny Novgorod Oblast Russian: Главное управление МВД России по Нижегородской области) (Russian: Нижегородская полиция, romanized: Nizhegorodskaya politsiya) is the state police force of Nizhny Novgorod Oblast, Russia.

The Nizhny Novgorod Oblast Police is a department of the Police of Russia of the Ministry of Internal Affairs responsible for civilian law enforcement in Nizhny Novgorod Oblast. It is one of the oldest police services in Russia and the world, established in 1733 by Anna of Russia as the municipal police for city of Nizhny Novgorod, and later became part of the militsiya system of the Soviet Union. The Nizhny Novgorod Oblast Police was known as the Gorky Militsiya from 1932 to 1990 and the Nizhny Novgorod Oblast Militsiya until 2011.

Major General Yuri Arsentiev is the current Chief of the Nizhny Novgorod Oblast Police and Colonel Andrey Basov is the current Chief of the Nizhny Novgorod City Police. The Nizhny Novgorod Oblast Police is headquartered in Gorky Street 71, Nizhny Novgorod.

== History ==
The Nizhny Novgorod Oblast Police was founded on 4 May [O.S. 23 April] 1733 in a decree issued by Empress Anna Ioannovna establishing police services in the cities of the Russian Empire. Originally it was a municipal police and firefighting force for the city of Nizhny Novgorod, but was also responsible for monitoring the condition of roads and bridges in the surrounding countryside. From 1799, Emperor Paul I provided the Nizhny Novgorod police with a reinforced city garrison of the Imperial Russian Army to assist with fighting crime. In the mid-19th century, the Nizhny Novgorod police came under control of the Ministry of Internal Affairs of the Russian Empire and its jurisdiction was expanded to the entirety of Nizhny Novgorod Governorate. After the October Revolution in 1917 it was gradually absorbed into the militsiya system of the Russian Soviet Federative Socialist Republic and then the Soviet Union. In 1932, it became the Gorky Militsiya when Nizhny Novgorod was renamed Gorky to celebrate the return of Marxist writer Maxim Gorky to Russia until the city's name was reverted in 1990. The Nizhny Novgorod Oblast Police received its current name in 2011 when the Soviet-era term militsiya was officially dropped and replaced with police for all police services in Russia.

== Main tasks ==
- ensuring the protection of the rights and freedoms of citizens of the Russian Federation, foreign citizens and stateless persons, combating crime, protecting public order and property, ensuring public safety on the territory of the Nizhny Novgorod Oblast;
- management of subordinate bodies and organizations;
- implementation of social and legal protection of employees of internal affairs bodies, federal state civil servants of the system of the Ministry of Internal Affairs of Russia and employees of the Main Directorate, subordinate bodies and organizations, social protection of family members of these employees, civil servants and employees, as well as citizens dismissed from service in the internal affairs bodies and from military service in the internal troops of the Ministry of Internal Affairs of Russia.

== Incidents ==
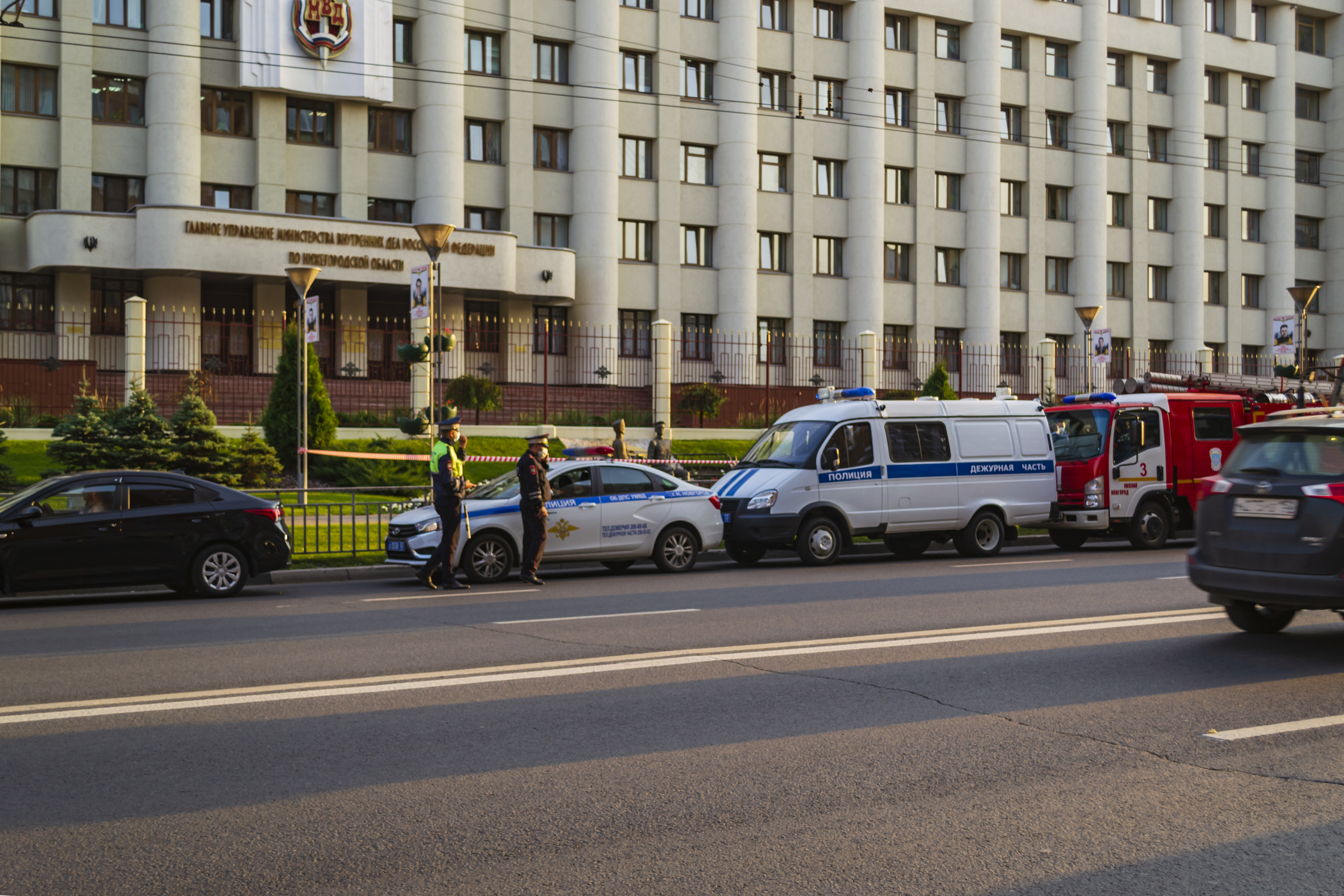
Emergency vehicles and police after Slavina's self-immolation.

On the afternoon of October 2, 2020, opposition journalist and activist Irina Slavina committed an act of self-immolation near the Nizhny Novgorod Oblast Police headquarters, opposite Gorkovskaya metro station. She did this in protest against the actions of the Nizhny Novgorod Oblast Police who searched her associates in the Open Russia case. Slavina herself acted there as a witness and never came under criminal prosecution. She herself wrote on her Facebook page;

I ask you to blame the Russian Federation for my death

Slavina had been preparing for this step for a long time, as evidenced by her publication on June 20, 2019 on her Facebook page.

Interestingly, if I arrange an act of self-immolation near the FSB entrance (or the city's prosecutor's office, I don't know yet), will this at least bring our state closer to a bright future, or will my sacrifice be meaningless? I think it's better to die like my grandmother from cancer at 52.
