= Pavel Khodorkovsky =

Russian businessman and political activist (born 1985)

- Павел Ходорковский
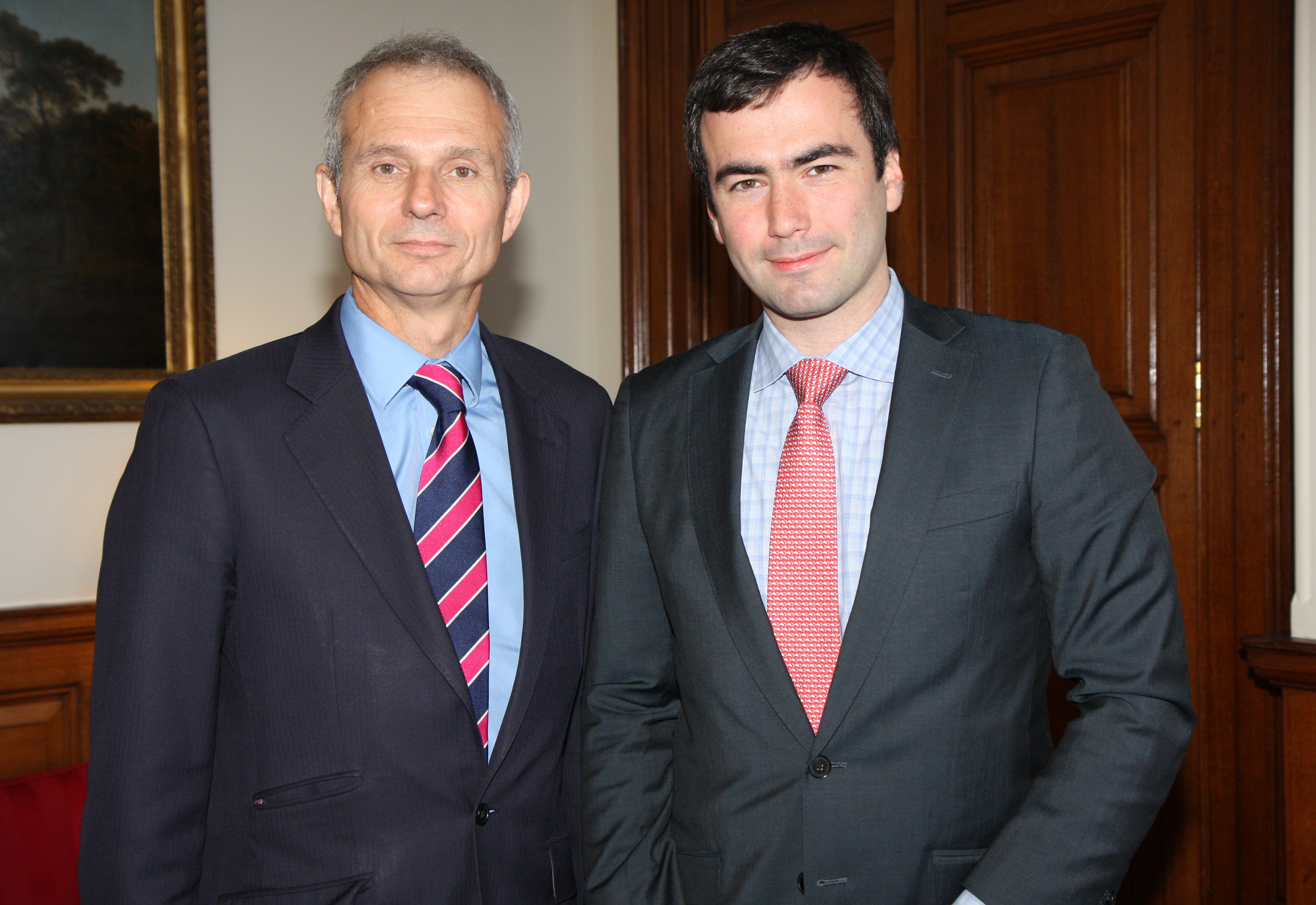
- Khodorkovsky (right) with David Lidington in 2013
- Born: Pavel Mikhailovich Khodorkovsky; June 14, 1985 (age 40); Russian SFSR, Soviet Union
- Education: Babson College
- Occupations: Businessman, political activist
- Organization(s): Enertiv, Institute of Modern Russia
- Spouse: Olesya Livanova (m. 2007)
- Children: 2
- Parent(s): Mikhail Khodorkovsky; Elena Dobrovolskaya

Pavel Mikhailovich Khodorkovsky (Russian: Павел Михайлович Ходорковский; born June 14, 1985) is a Russian businessman and political activist who has lived in the United States since 2003. He is a son of Russian businessman Mikhail Khodorkovsky, who was once the richest person in Russia. In 2010, the younger Khodorkovsky co-founded Enertiv, an energy monitoring firm for commercial facilities.

Khodorkovsky, who like his father is a fierce critic of Vladimir Putin, is the founder of the Institute of Modern Russia.

According to the New York Observer, Khodorkovsky "possesses the familial resolve." In April 2014, Jewish Business News wrote: "It is always difficult to follow in the footsteps of a successful father, and that is what Pavel Khodorkovskiy has done, successfully too."

== Early life and education ==
Khodorkovsky was born on June 14, 1985, to Mikhail Khodorkovsky and his first wife Elena Dobrovolskaya. He is Mikhail Khodorkovsky's eldest son. His parents were divorced when he was three years old. He is one of four children of Mikhail Khodorkovsky.

The younger Khodorkovsky later described his childhood relationship with his father as "excellent" and said that his mother often let him see his father after the divorce. Khodorkovsky told Le Figaro in 2013 that his father had "always struggled not to spoil his children. He wanted the rewards to be progressive. Because if it was immediately the best toys, the best cars…we would no longer want anything. I will do the same thing with my daughter."

At the age of 14, Khodorkovsky was sent to boarding school in Switzerland. He attended the school for four years," after which he decided to continue his studies in the U.S. According to the Moscow Times, Khodorkovsky "said he chose to study in the United States on his own and his decision was not connected with what was going on with Yukos," his father's firm, which had come under pressure from the Russian government. Khodorkovsky later said that his father had "advised [him] to study at a university abroad" but that the decision to go to the U.S. was his own. Khodorkovsky moved to the U.S. at age 18 in the autumn of 2003 to study business administration at Babson College in Wellesley, Massachusetts, which is near Boston.

Khodorkovsky later said that he saw his father "frequently" in Moscow during the summer of 2003 before leaving for the U.S. At the time of his departure, he later said, Yukos was plainly "under pressure, but it was unclear how serious the attack against the management would be." In September 2003, his father visited him in Massachusetts. At that time, according to the younger Khodorkovsky, "his father seemed to sense his looming arrest." The younger Khodorkovsky later told the Moscow Times:"I asked him how things were going, and he said that imprisoning him was the only thing left to do." Still, the younger Khodorkovsky said, "it seemed so unreal at the time. A merger with Sibneft was under way. They were making the world's fourth-largest company by production volume.… And it seemed that things would come out all right and nothing would happen." In a 2011 interview, he told Forbes: "When I left for Boston, I knew there was a problem but it wasn't critical." Mikhail Khodorkovsky's visit to his son in Massachusetts in the September 2003 marked the last time the two would see each other before the senior Khodorkovsky's arrest on October 26, 2003.

At the time of the arrest, the younger Khodorkovsky was 18 and "had just been really getting to know his dad, who was divorced from his mother and had spent much of Pavel's childhood building his business and fortune." According to the Daily Telegraph, one of Pavel Khodorkovsky's "greatest regrets is that his father's imprisonment came just as he was beginning to understand his passion for business, spending the odd day as a teenager at the offices of Yukos." Khodorkovsky's was distraught by his father's arrest and imprisonment and "had to learn to make his way alone." The ensuing "decade-long separation" between the younger Khodorkovsky and his father "defined his adult life," stated The Telegraph in December 2013.

He graduated in 2007 with a degree in business administration."

== Career ==
In 2007, after receiving his bachelor's degree from Babson, Khodorkovsky moved to New York City. He began working as a project manager for New Media Internet, a firm owned by Russian businessman Vladimir Gusinsky, who had relocated to the U.S. New Media Internet oversees technical support for Russian news websites. This was Khodorkovsky's first job.

Interviewed in New York in November 2010, Khodorkovsky said, "I never thought that I would stay here. I had another plan initially," namely to "return to Russia after graduating from college." Following his father's arrest, however, "coming to Moscow made no sense anymore." According to The Moscow Times, he "received word through his father's lawyers" after the arrest "that he should stay away from Russia for safety's sake." The Telegraph later stated that he had decided it was unwise to return to Russia, even for a visit, because he feared arrest or official harassment. His only contact with his father during the latter's incarceration was therefore by letter and telephone. In January 2011, Khodorkovsky told the New York Observer that he was afraid "to go back to Russia" because if anything happened to him "it would break my father." He expressed concern, moreover, that a "bag of coke could end up in my luggage," and pointed out that there "is very little recourse in Russia" in cases of unjust persecutions. He told Le Figaro in 2013 that the reason why he had not returned to Russia was that he had feared "being sent for military service."

=== Enertiv ===
In 2010, Pavel and his Babson classmate Connell McGill Jr. co-founded Enertiv, a firm that manufactures "smart-meters and energy-saving software" to remotely monitor energy consumption. Enertiv provides services for businesses and organizations to monitor the amount of electricity consumed by every circuit in a building and help bring down energy costs. As of September 2010, the firm reportedly had no U.S. rivals. Enertiv was one of five finalists in the NYU Stern New Venture Competition. It lost the competition in April 2011, but later that week won its first big contract "from a school in New Haven where it had completed a pilot project."

Khodorkovskiy serves as chief technical officer., while McGill is Chief Executive.

The firm's offices are headquartered in New York. Investors in Enertiv include Vaidya Capital Partners and R/GA Ventures, the latter of which was set up by branding agency R/GA, part of The Interpublic Group. Other investors include Jerry Kestenbaum, president of BuildingLink; Cameron Drummond of Mastodon Capital Management; Daniel Feldman, a New York investor; Stephen Plumlee, chief operating officer of R/GA and manager of R/GA's venture unit; and Asad Husain of Bald Eagle Capital and Interpublic Group. Both Khodorkovsky and McGill invested in the first round of seed funding. Part of Khodorkovsky's job with the firm involves "flying around the country and running around New York City installing Enertiv's hardware devices in customer locations like schools and office buildings."

In a detailed account of Enertiv's product, the Jewish Business News noted that the firm "offers a device which monitors the energy consumption in buildings in real time. It informs the building's owner and/or superintendents if and when any lights or electrical devices, such as air conditioners, are still operating after working hours. It can also detect malfunctions in different systems, such as when a motor is not working properly and therefore drains more electricity." The device provides information about energy use "in a user friendly format, allowing clients to access the current status of their energy usage on line." The firm's software platform, moreover, "lets building owners or managing superintendents measure performance levels from an individual piece of equipment, an office suite, a single building and even an entire portfolio of properties, thanks to the advanced algorithms developed by the company." In addition, the firm works with clients "to incentivize, to maximize savings through competition." Khodorkovsky has said that the company's system "has proved to be popular among property owners and operators through its ability to pinpoint each energy inefficient behavior with simple language in real-time."

In April 2014, Enertiv predicted that it would soon be ready to complete its first round of seed funding, in which it hoped to raise between $500,000 and $750,000. Industry reports stated that there appeared to be "no shortage of potential investors." In July 2014, it was reported that the firm had "just closed on a $700,000 seed investment round." The investment, said Khodorkovsky, provided "validation from other investors," including his father, who had invested in the company "as part of a $550,000 friends-and-family round."

Enertiv has completed seven rounds of funding, the latest being in 2017 with two rounds of venture funding totaling $1,460,000.

Khodorkovsky said that his father had not originally been impressed by his plan to launch the firm. "He was very skeptical for a while," the younger Khodorkovsky said. "He thinks in different orders of magnitude." But when the firm managed to raise money, his father "believed we were on the right track." After his father was released from prison, the younger Khodorkovsky said he was optimistic to discuss plans with him. He said that his father had been "giving me advice through the years, but now we are able to have a proper conversation, I'm going to be picking his brains a lot, you can bet on that." The elder Khodorkovsky has encouraged the younger to expand the venture's goal to eventually cover global electronic needs. His father, he told Le Figaro in 2013, "is tougher than me in business. Sees everything, thinks quickly. He keeps telling me that this is the key to success in business. He often criticizes me for not going fast enough and that I have a tendency to 'think too much about my decisions!'"

In 2017, an article noted that Enertiv was one of eight companies using big data to change the way real estate is tracked and priced.

== Activism ==
In February 2010, Khodorkovsky founded the Institute of Modern Russia, a non-governmental human-rights organization dedicated to the promotion of democracy in Russia. Underwritten by the Eurasia Fund and by his father's group Open Russia, which "promotes democratic development in Russia," the institute's objectives include "strengthening Russia's 'rule of law', promoting democracy, and improving relationships between Russia and other nations."

Khodorkovsky said in November 2010 that "he missed his father and regretted only growing especially close to him in the months before his arrest." He stated the greatest difficulty was their relationship had only grown just before the arrest. He described himself as optimistic about the outcome of his father's trial "but did not expect an outright acquittal because that would allow his father to be freed" at the end of his sentence in 2011. "The presidential elections are in 2012," observed Khodorkovsky. "Who will release him in 2011, right before the elections?" Khodorkovsky declared that his father had planned to quit business in 2008 to focus more on politics, but he dismissed rumors that his father ever planned to run for government office. The younger Khodorkovsky had hoped his father would win, but stated he was prepared for his father's imprisonment. He stated that he would continue his activism despite the outcome of his father's case.

Khodorkovsky's father was convicted in December 2010. "On the eve of his father's sentencing," reported the New York Observer, Pavel sent his father a note asking for advice regarding the corporate structure of Enertiv. The elder Khodorkovsky reportedly answered "Limit your personal liability."

"My dad's fight is for something above and beyond his own freedom," Khodorkovsky said in January 2011. "I still have friends in Russia. They tell me he's not alone. There are many similar cases. They just don't get the media attention." In May 2011 he told Forbes that he had decided several months earlier, "when it was becoming clear how the trial would go," that he had to "raise my own profile" and "step up my role and start speaking to media and officials" about the situation in Russia generally and his father's case in particular. Consequently, he lobbied U.S. officials, including members of Congress, about his father's case, and "also attended the first U.S. screening of Khodorkovsky, a documentary about his father's life including his power struggle with Putin that first premiered at the Berlin Film Festival." In addition, he "organized rallies in Times Square" and helped arrange a July 2011 charity concert in Strasbourg, France, for political prisoners in Russia. "We know we're in for a long haul," he told Forbes."

Also in May 2011, Khodorkovsky called on supporters of his father to write letters on his behalf to Russian President Dmitry Medvedev. He asserted that any official condemnations of the ruling would incite the Russian government. He added that his father's case underscored the risks faced by foreign investors in Russia. He noted that the appeal rejection would present itself as a substantial risk for investors. He also promised that he would will keep fighting for his father's freedom and for a free Russia. "It's very important to keep my father's story in the public domain, it ensures his well-being in prison," he maintained. In the same month, he told Forbes that "Putin doesn't see a way to release my father without admitting fault or defeat....Keeping him in jail makes him more powerful." As of 2013, Khodorkovsky was allowed to speak to his father by telephone "every fortnight for a few minutes."

Khodorkovsy has stated that he had two interrelated goals: one to get his father out of prison, the other to improve Russian rule of law. Khodorkovsky told Le Figaro in that year, before his father's release. "He has become one of the few political prisoners in Russian history to celebrate a full decade in prison, but contrary to what was expected by the government, he has not been forgotten or broken. Instead, by trying to destroy the opposition, deprive it of funds and scare it off, Putin has created an Opposition figure of opposition and awakened society."

Pavel Khodorkovsky met with Minister for Europe, David Lidington, in October 2013, to discuss his father's imprisonment and urge Europe to put pressure on Russia for the release of his father.

In 2017, the Institute of Modern Russia was banned by the Prosecutor General of Russia. The reason for the ban on the US-based NGO was given as "undesirable". Any association with the organization as well as its two sister organizations, UK-based Open Russia and Open Russia Civic Movement, is outlawed.

=== Father's release ===
Pavel Khodorkovsky flew to Berlin with his daughter Diana to be reunited with his father after the latter's release from prison in December 2013. "I certainly knew that it hasn't been easy for him," the younger Khodorkovsky told the Telegraph. "He knows that he has had a lot of support form a lot of different people across the world, but he knows how much the family has been waiting to see him. He said to me: 'thank you for not giving up on me' which was so important to me." He described his father's release as "a big surprise – to my father as well – because no-one thought it was going to happen....Once we knew from the press conference we had no idea when or how it would happen. Certainly, no-one knew it would happen so quickly."

The younger Khodorkovsky had made it clear in an October 2013 interview with the Telegraph that he viewed his father's decision to stay in Russia and go to prison as a decision "to put principle before family – above the needs, even, of his own son." This decision, the Telegraph stated after the elder Khodorkovsky's prison release, had left Pavel "with a complicated set of emotions, which he now looked forward to talking through when the time came." After his father's release, the younger Khodorkovsky assured the Telegraph, "We're definitely going to have those conversations, but later. I don't want to go there now because so much has happened, there is so much emotion." For him, reportedly, "the only concern is that his father is now free, and that he has an opportunity to rebuild a relationship that was snatched away from him on the very cusp of adulthood." Khodorkovsky said, "There is so much to say, but for now, I just want to enjoy him being here. This Christmas is literally the best ever, the best to date."

== Views on Russia ==
Khodorkovsky said in a January 2013 interview with Business Insider that the Kremlin's clampdown on its domestic opponents meant that the "criteria by which we judge the progress" in Russian democracy "will have to change." He also called the Magnitsky Act passed by the U.S. Congress important, "not just in the Hermitage Capital case, but also for other jailed dissidents, such as his father."

Khodorkovsky has severely criticized Russia's ban on U.S. adoptions of Russian children. In his Business Insider interview, he described it as "a bargaining chip for Russia, and one that Russian orphans would lose out from." He noted that "1,500 kids...are dying in orphanages every year in Russia, and those are just the official statistics....It certainly looks like they have a much better chance of getting proper medical care, and frankly surviving, here in the U.S." He stated that he was surprised at the passage of the ban, having thought that it would sweep the United Russia Party but be opposed by other parties; but "then it flew through all the three readings, almost unanimously voted for." Describing the ban as a result of the anti-Americanism that had been "fostered over the past 10 years" in Russia, he noted that many of the children in Russian orphanages that were being adopted by U.S. parents were "of Tartar, Kyrgyz, Kazakh origin, and, frankly, they're not popular with Russian foster parents." The adoption ban, he suggested, was the product of a desire "to create an additional lever" to hurt the U.S. after the realization that the prohibition of visits to Russia by U.S. officials was a non-starter, given that "not many [U.S.] officials travel to Russia. I don't think that McCain is going skiing in the Ural Mountains anytime soon."

About Putin, Khodorkovsky told Business Insider: "He cannot show any mercy, any weakness." Khodorkovsky stated that "a year ago, both my father and I were thinking we'll have major changes [in Russia] in two years. But you ask me today, I don't know."

== Personal life ==
Khodorkovsky and his wife, Olesya Livanova, met in the U.S. and married in 2007. She is from Penza, Russia. They live with their two children in the Chelsea neighborhood of Manhattan." An article in The Observer reported that Khodorkovsky paid just $3,76 million for the apartment, in stark comparison with many other offspring of oligarchs.

== Ancestry ==
Ancestors of Pavel Khodorkovsky

16. Shamo Khodorkovsky
8. Moisei Khodorkovsky
17.
4. Boris Khodorkovsky
18.
9.
19.
2. Mikhail Khodorkovsky
20. Michael Petrov
10. Filip Petrov
21. Vera Petrova
5. Marina Petrova
22.
11.
23.
1. Pavel Khodorkovsky
24.
12.
25.
6. Boris Dobrovolsky
26.
13.
27.
3. Elena Dobrovolskaya
28.
14. Arsenti
29.
7. Larissa Dobrovolskaya
30.
15.
31.
