= My Fellow Prisoners =

2014 book by Mikhail Khodorkovsky

- Author: Mikhail Khodorkovsky
- Language: German, English, Russian, Polish, Swedish, French, Finnish, Dutch
- Published: May 27, 2014 Penguin Books (UK)
- ISBN: 978-0141979816

My Fellow Prisoners is a book by Mikhail Khodorkovsky, published by Penguin Books, in 2014. The book relates his experiences in prison after his arrest in 2003 by Russian authorities. Within his narrative he presents his critiques and concerns of modern Russian politics and civil society.

== Book ==
Khodorkovsky, a businessman who at the time was the richest man in Russia and a harsh critic of the government of Vladimir Putin, was arrested on charges of fraud on October 25, 2003. He was put on trial in 2005 and then held in various Russian penal colonies for the next eight years. My Fellow Prisoners is an account of his life in prison. It focuses less on Khodorkovsky himself than on some of the people he met during his time in custody, including prison guards and fellow inmates. His objective is to paint a picture of life in a contemporary Russian prison in a variety of aspects and from a range of perspectives. The book consists of brief chapters, described in one review as “sketches,” mostly three to five pages long.

Some of the chapters of Khodorkovsky's book amount to brief portraits of his fellow inmates. Among them are Sergei, a railroad worker arrested for drug dealing; Kolya, a prisoner who, after being beaten by a guard “opened himself up” in an act of “full-on hara-kiri,” causing his innards to spill out; Alexander, “a real-life Nazi” who “doesn't believe in the Holocaust”; Alexei, imprisoned at age nineteen as a pedophile for having a relationship with a girl younger than himself; Artyom, a prisoner whom Khodorkovsky and other prisoners saved from a suicide attempt; Arkady, an orderly who “works as a 'tongue-loosener'” who tries to extract information about any crimes or accomplices the new arrival might have kept quiet about during his investigation.”

Among the chapter titles are “The Rat,” “The Father,” “The Addict,” and “The Thief.” Khodorkovsky discusses the “caste of untouchables” in prison, including gays, rapists, and child abusers. He also examines the role and character of police, lawyers, and judges, saying that in the course of their work “they lie virtually all the time, and as a rule tell the truth only to gain someone's trust – which then enables them to lie more successfully afterwards.” He describes the prison guards as “embedding a criminal ideology” among prisoners, thereby “effectively training up the future foot-soldiers of the criminal world.” He also writes that although the investigator is supposed to act independently, he is, in fact, “just a cog in the law-enforcement hierarchy – a small-time bureaucrat who often doesn't even have a say in some of the key aspects of his work.” He states: “The people who feel most uninhibited in prison are the police investigators.”

Although his book consists largely of narrative and description, occasionally Khodorkovsky shares his reflections on such question as “what is conscience? How do we define what is 'good', and what do we feel ashamed of for the rest of our lives? When does conscience overcome fear, and when does fear overrule conscience?” As an illustration of conscience overcoming fear, he writes about a fellow prisoner, Lyosha, who was bribed to tell lies against Khodorkovsky in court but who told the truth anyway. In the book, Khodorkovsky offers the observation that “what takes place in prison” can sometimes seem “like a version of ordinary life beyond the prison gates, just taken to a grotesque extreme.” In addition, he states that he considers it likely “that over the next few years” Russians will find themselves “living in a bureaucratic-police state, with absolute power in the hands of a corrupt bureaucracy.”

== Reception ==
John Lloyd, a reviewer for Financial Times, wrote that “the sketches in this new book are vivid, humane and poignant....Khodorkovsky’s testimony is that here is a corrupt system with little or no effort to do more than coop up the hopeless, the drug-addicted, the vicious – and the occasional visionary. His vision is that Russia 'will ultimately take the road of European civilization'.... Khodorkovsky’s vision will take time – and may be realised in harsher ways than he hopes.” John O'Malley in the Washington Post called Khodorkovsky's book an "illuminating and brave", noting that the stories accurately depict the state of Russian civil society caused by the years of political apathy and authoritarian rule. Roger Boyes of The Times gave a similar praise for My Fellow Prisoners describing the book as an accurate diagnosis of Russia's political struggles as evidenced by its symptoms, naming Khodorkovsky's "real crime" as failure to pledge feudal loyalty.
