= Mikhail Khodorkovsky =

Russian businessman (born 1963)

- Михаил Ходорковский
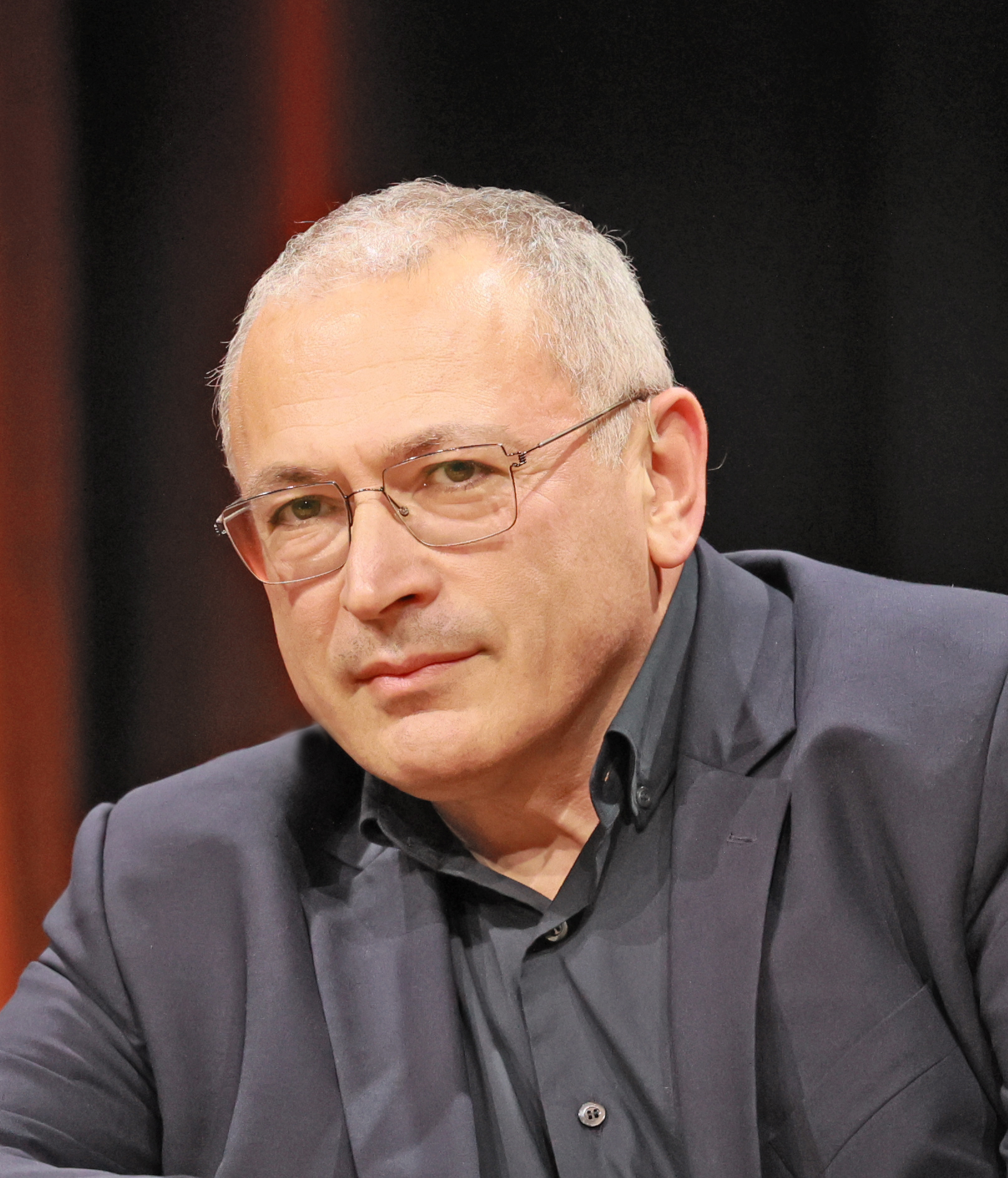
- Khodorkovsky in 2023
- Born: 26 June 1963 (age 63); Moscow, Soviet Union
- Education: Mendeleev Russian University of Chemistry and Technology
- Occupations: Head of Group Menatep (1990–2003); Deputy Minister of Energy (1993); Chairman & CEO of Yukos (1997–2004); The New Times Columnist (2011–2014); Founder of Open Russia (2014–2021)
- Spouses: Yelena Dobrovolskaya (div.); Inna Khodorkovskaya
- Children: Pavel, Anastasia, Ilya, Gleb
- Mikhail Khodorkovsky's voice Recorded 22 May 2014
- Website: khodorkovsky.ru

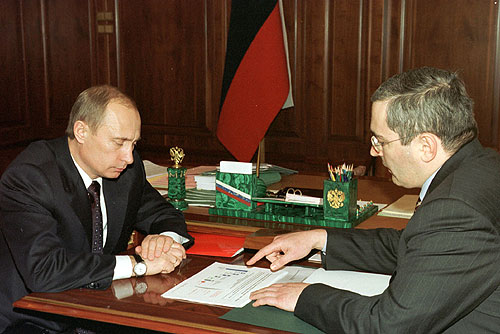
Khodorkovsky with the president of Russia, Vladimir Putin, on 20 December 2002

Mikhail Borisovich Khodorkovsky (Russian: Михаил Борисович Ходорковский, IPA: [mʲɪxɐˈil xədɐrˈkofskʲɪj]; born 26 June 1963), sometimes known by his initials MBK, is an exiled Russian businessman, oligarch, and opposition activist, now residing in London. In 2003, Khodorkovsky was believed to be the wealthiest man in Russia, with a fortune estimated to be worth $15 billion, and was ranked 16th on Forbes list of billionaires. He had worked his way up the Komsomol apparatus, during the Soviet years, and started several businesses during the period of glasnost and perestroika in the late 1980s. In 1989, he became chairman of the Board of Bank Menatep, which he founded. After the dissolution of the Soviet Union, in the mid-1990s, he accumulated considerable wealth by obtaining control of a number of Siberian oil fields unified under the name Yukos, one of the major companies to emerge from the privatization of state assets during the 1990s (a scheme known as "Loans for Shares").

In 2001, Khodorkovsky founded Open Russia, a reform-minded organization intending to "build and strengthen civil society" in the country. In October 2003, he was arrested by Russian authorities and charged with fraud. The government of President Vladimir Putin then froze shares of Yukos shortly thereafter on tax charges. Putin's government took further actions against Yukos, leading to a collapse of the company's share price and the evaporation of much of Khodorkovsky's wealth. In May 2005, he was found guilty and sentenced to nine years in prison. In December 2010, while he was still serving his sentence, Khodorkovsky and his business partner Platon Lebedev were further charged with and found guilty of embezzlement and money laundering. Khodorkovsky's prison sentence was extended to 2014. After former German minister for foreign affairs Hans-Dietrich Genscher lobbied for his release, Putin pardoned Khodorkovsky, releasing him from jail on 20 December 2013.

There was widespread concern internationally that the trials and sentencing were politically motivated. The trial was criticized abroad for the lack of due process. Khodorkovsky lodged several applications with the European Court of Human Rights, seeking redress for alleged violations by Russia of his human rights. In response to his first application, which concerned events from 2003 to 2005, the court found that several violations were committed by the Russian authorities in their treatment of Khodorkovsky. Despite these findings, the court ultimately ruled that the trial was not politically motivated, but rather "that the charges against him were grounded in 'reasonable suspicion'". He was considered to be a prisoner of conscience by Amnesty International.

On being pardoned by Putin and released from prison at the end of 2013, Khodorkovsky immediately left Russia and was granted residency in Switzerland. At the end of 2013, his personal estate was believed to be worth, as a rough estimate, $100–250 million. At the end of 2014, he was said to be worth about $500 million. In 2015, he moved to London. In December 2016, the Dublin District Court unfroze $100m of Khodorkovsky's assets that had been held in the Republic of Ireland.

In 2014, Khodorkovsky re-launched Open Russia to promote several reforms to Russian civil society, including free and fair elections, political education, protection of journalists and activists, endorsing the rule of law, and ensuring media independence. He was described by The Economist as "the Kremlin's leading critic-in-exile".

== Early years and entrepreneurship in Soviet Union ==
=== Early life and education ===
Khodorkovsky's parents, Boris and Marina Khodorkovsky, were engineers at a factory making measuring instruments in Moscow. Khodorkovsky's father is Jewish, and his mother was Orthodox Christian. They were both opponents of communism, though they kept this from their son, who was born in 1963. Having experienced a rise in state anti-Semitism and the death of Stalin, the Khodorkovskys were part of a generation of well-educated Soviets who were silently supportive of dissidents.

The family were moderately well off, living in a two-room flat in a concrete block in the suburbs of Moscow. Masha Gessen wrote that they faced a dilemma raising Mikhail: “Speak your mind about the Soviet Union and risk making your child miserable, with the constant need for doublethink and doublespeak, or try to raise a contented conformist. They chose the second path, with results that far exceeded their expectations. Mikhail became a fervent Communist and Soviet patriot, a member of a species that had seemed all but extinct."

The young Khodorkovsky was ambitious and received excellent grades. He became deputy head of Komsomol (the Communist Youth League) at his university, the D. Mendeleev University of Chemical Technology of Russia, from which he graduated with a degree in chemical engineering in 1986. While at the institute, Khodorkovsky married a fellow student, Yelena. They had a son, Pavel. In 1986, he met an 18-year-old, Inna, a student at the Mendeleev Institute who was a colleague of Khodorkovsky's at the Komsomol organization. He courted her and slept in his car until she took him in. They had a daughter and twin sons. He and his first wife remained on good terms, and she would later take an active part in the campaign for his release from prison.

=== First business activities ===
After his graduation in 1986, Khodorkovsky began to work full-time for the Komsomol, which was a typical way of entering upon a Soviet political career. "After several years of working mostly to collect Komsomol dues from fellow students", noted Gessen, "he could expect to be appointed to a junior position in city management someplace far from the capital."

But instead of following this path, he exploited "quasi-official and often extra-legal business opportunities" and began to make a business career for himself. With partners from Komsomol, and technically operating under its authority, Khodorkovsky opened his first business in 1986, a private café. The enterprise was made possible by the Soviet leader Mikhail Gorbachev's programme of perestroika and glasnost.

The introduction of perestroika enabled Khodorkovsky to use his connections within the communist structures to gain a foothold in the developing free market. With the help of some powerful people, he started his business activities under the cover of Komsomol. Friendship with another Komsomol leader, Alexey Golubovich, had a significant impact on his growing success, since Golubovich's parents held top positions in Gosbank, the State Bank of the USSR. Among the businesses in which Khodorkovsky "tried his hand" were "importing personal computers and, according to some sources, counterfeit alcohol." In addition, he "ventured into finance, devising ways to squeeze cash out of the Soviet planned-economy behemoth."

=== Menatep ===
In 1987, Khodorkovsky and his partners opened a Center for Scientific and Technical Creativity of the Youth. In addition to importing and reselling computers, the "scientific" center was involved in trading a wide range of other products. The opening of the center eventually made possible the founding of Bank Menatep.

Employees of the Bank of New York, which was closely associated with Bruce Rappaport, worked very closely with his Menatep helping Menatep to list its stock in the United States. Natasha Gurfinkel Kagalovskaya, who is married to a former senior executive at Bank Menatep Konstantin Kagalovsky, supervised the Bank of New York's Eastern European business beginning in 1992. She had been a banker with Irving Trust since 1986 which was acquired by the Bank of New York in 1988. Vladimir Kirillovich Golitsyn or "Mickey" Galitzine had previously headed the Eastern European business at the Bank of New York and travelled for the first time to Russia in 1990.

He and his partners obtained a banking license, supposedly from money made from selling secondhand computers, to create Bank Menatep in 1989. As one of Russia's first privately owned banks, Menatep expanded quickly, by using most of the deposits raised to finance Khodorkovsky's import-export operations, which is a questionable practice in itself. Moreover, the government granted Bank Menatep the right to manage funds allocated for the victims of the Chernobyl nuclear accident. Khodorkovsky said:

Many years later I talked with people and asked them, why didn't you start doing the same thing? Why didn't you go into it? Because any head of an institute had more possibilities than I had, by an order of magnitude. They explained that they had all gone through the period when the same system was allowed. And then, at best, people were unable to succeed in their career and, at worst, found themselves in jail. They were all sure that would be the case this time, and that is why they did not go into it. And I...I did not remember this! I was too young! And I went for it."

It was during this period that Khodorkovsky acquired the Yukos oil company for about $300 million through a rigged auction. Khodorkovsky subsequently went on a campaign to raise investment funds abroad, borrowing hundreds of millions. When the 1998 financial crisis struck Russia, Khodorkovsky defaulted on some of his foreign debt and took his Yukos shares offshore to protect them from creditors.

=== Yeltsin adviser ===
Khodorkovsky also served as an economic adviser to the first government of Boris Yeltsin. "During the failed 1991 coup by Communist hard-liners", Gessen wrote, "he was on the barricades in front of Moscow's White House, helping to defend the government." Shortly thereafter, having lost his faith in Communism, he and his business associate Leonid Nevzlin wrote a "capitalist manifesto" entitled The Man with the Ruble, which stated in part: "It is time to stop living according to Lenin! ... Our guiding light is Profit, acquired in a strictly legal way. Our Lord is His Majesty, Money, for it is only He who can lead us to wealth as the norm in life."

=== Yukos acquisition ===
In 1992, Khodorkovsky was appointed chairman of the Investment Promotion Fund of the fuel and power industry. He was appointed Deputy Minister of Fuel and Energy of Russia in March 1993. In 1996, Menatep acquired a major Russian oil producer, Yukos, which had debts exceeding $3.5 billion, for $309 million.

In the 1990s, noted Gessen, "Khodorkovsky made millions in currency trading. He also bought up privatization vouchers—documents distributed to every Russian citizen and entitling them to a share of the national wealth—which many Russians were happy to unload at a discount for ready cash. Khodorkovsky eventually acquired controlling stakes in some 30 companies. When Russia staged its greatest property giveaway ever, in 1995, Khodorkovsky was poised to take advantage of that too." As Gessen explained, the Russian government, after the fall of Communism, "still nominally controlled Russia's largest companies, though they had been variously re-structured, abandoned, or looted by their own executives." A dozen men, the "new oligarchs", including Khodorkovsky, hit upon the stratagem of lending the government money against collateral consisting of blocks of stock that amounted to controlling interests in those companies. The oligarchs and government both knew that the government would eventually default and that the firms would thus pass into the oligarchs' hands. "By this maneuver", wrote Gessen, "the Yeltsin administration privatized oil, gas, minerals, and other enterprises without parliamentary approval." This was how Khodorkovsky came to own Yukos.

When he came into possession of Yukos, a conglomerate consisting of over 20 firms, most of them were "in terrible condition", and he enjoyed the job of turning them into well-functioning units. According to Gellin, Khodorkovsky was "the most reticent among the oligarchs", choosing not to "buy yachts or villas on the Côte d’Azur" or to become a fixture of "the Moscow playboy scene". To be sure, he did buy "a gated compound of seven houses on 50 forested acres about half an hour outside Moscow" in the late 1990s, calling it Apple Orchard and housing Yukos's leading executives, who lived together as "one large happy family". His social life consisted mostly of "Barbecuing for fellow Yukos managers". At nights he would stay up and "read until two". He later wrote that during this period "I saw business as a game. ... It was a game in which you wanted to win but losing was also an option. It was a game in which hundreds of thousands of people came to work in the morning to play with me."

Nevzlin told Gessen about a time when Khodorkovsky was in Poland on business and the Soviet economic-crimes unit began harassing Nevzlin, who feared arrest under Soviet-era laws. He found the situation "terrifying", but when Khodorkovsky returned from Poland he said, "Let me go home, take a shower, get some sleep, and we'll talk about it tomorrow morning." Nevzlin told Gessen: "There was just no way to shake him, ever." Nevzlin described Khodorkovsky as a "data addict", a man with "an iron will," and "someone dependent on human stimulus for information and ideas." Although Khodorkovsky "has strong emotions," Nevzlin said, he is capable of turning them off.

=== European Union Bank in Antigua ===
For one week in 1994, he was the director of an online internet bank known as the European Union Bank based in Antigua after which it collapsed. Numerous banking regulators claimed it was a scam.

=== Bank failure ===
By 1998, Khodorkovsky had built an import-export business with an annual turnover of 80 million rubles (about US$10 million). In the 1998 Russian crash, however, his bank went under and Yukos had serious problems owing to a drop in the price of oil. Realizing that "business could no longer be just a game" and that "capitalism could make people not only rich and happy but also poor and powerless", he "swore off his absolute faith in wealth just as he had sworn off his absolute faith in Communism."

=== Early philanthropic activities ===
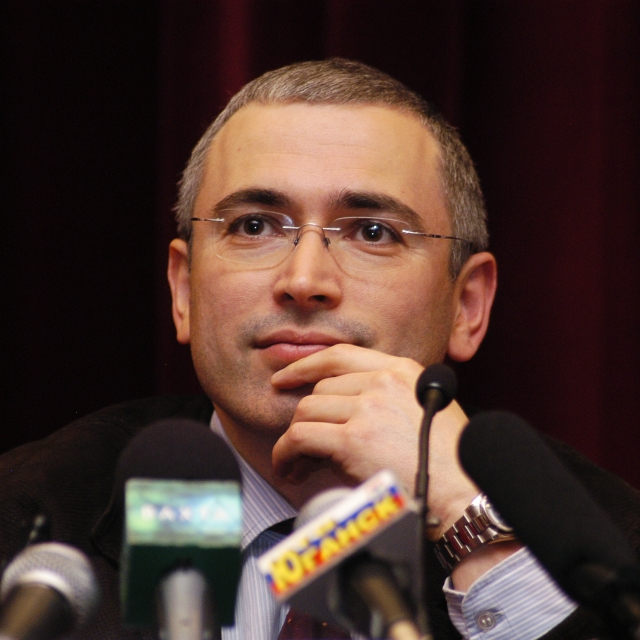
Khodorkovsky in 2001

After the price of oil began to rise again, he established the Open Russia Foundation, in 2001. It was based at Somerset House in London with Henry Kissinger as one of its trustees. The Foundation's mission statement declared: "The motivation for the establishment of the Open Russia Foundation is the wish to foster enhanced openness, understanding and integration between the people of Russia and the rest of the world." The following year it had its United States launch in Washington, D.C.

In addition to founding Open Russia, Khodorkovsky "funded Internet cafés in the provinces, to get people to talk to one another. He funded training sessions for journalists all over the country. [In 1994] He established a boarding school for disadvantaged children and pulled his own parents out of retirement to run it. By some estimates, he was supporting half of all non-governmental organizations in Russia, by others, he was funding 80 percent of them. In 2003, Yukos pledged $100 million over 10 years to the Russian State Humanities University, the best liberal-arts school in the country—the first time a private company had contributed a significant amount of money to a Russian educational institution."

He also founded internet-training centres for teachers, a forum for the discussion by journalists of reform and democracy, and foundations which finance archaeological digs, cultural exchanges, summer camps for children and a boarding school for orphans.

=== Merger with Sibneft ===
In April 2003, Khodorkovsky announced that Yukos would merge with Sibneft, creating an oil company with reserves equal to those of Western petroleum multinationals. Khodorkovsky had been reported to be involved in negotiations with ExxonMobil and ChevronTexaco to sell one or the other of them a large stake in Yukos. Sibneft was created in 1995, at the suggestion of Boris Berezovsky, comprising some of the most valuable assets of a state-owned oil company. In a controversial auction process, Berezovsky acquired 50% of the company at what most agree was a very low price.

When Berezovsky had a confrontation with Putin, and felt compelled to leave Russia for London (where he was granted asylum), he assigned his shares in Sibneft to Roman Abramovich. Abramovich subsequently agreed to the merger. With 19.5 billion barrels (3 km^{3}) of oil and gas, the merged entity would have owned the second-largest oil and gas reserves in the world after ExxonMobil and would have been the fourth largest in the world in terms of production, pumping 2.3 million barrels (370,000 m^{3}) of crude a day. The combination of the companies closed in October 2003, just prior to the arrest of Khodorkovsky, but through a series of questionable legal maneuvers, the former Sibneft shareholders were able to get the transaction negated.

=== 2003: Richest man in Russia ===
Khodorkovsky hired McKinsey & Company to reform Yukos's management structure, and Pricewaterhouse to establish an accounting system. Thanks partly to the rising oil prices, partly to modernized operations, and partly to its "new transparency", Yukos thrived. "By 2003, Khodorkovsky was the richest man in Russia, and potentially on his way to becoming the richest man in the world. In 2004, Forbes placed him 16th on its list of the world's wealthiest people, with a fortune estimated at $16 billion."

== Criminal charges and incarceration ==
=== 2003 arrest ===
In early July 2003, Platon Lebedev, Khodorkovsky's partner and the fourth largest shareholder in Yukos, was arrested on suspicion of illegally acquiring a stake in the state-owned fertilizer firm Apatit in 1994. The arrest was followed by purported investigations into taxation returns filed by Yukos, and a delay in the antitrust commission's approval of its merger with Sibneft.

On the morning of 25 October 2003, Khodorkovsky was arrested at Novosibirsk airport. He was taken to Moscow and charged with fraud, tax evasion, and other economic crimes. Gessen describes the trial as a "travesty" and "a Kafka-esque procedure", with the government spending months "on an incoherent account of alleged violations that were criminalized after they were committed, or that were in fact legal activities." In preparing the case, the government called in Yukos employees for questioning. Pavel Ivlev, a tax lawyer who went along as their attorney, later explained that officials had illegally interrogated him and threatened to arrest him. After leaving the prosecutor's office, he immediately fled the country. He and his family ended up settling in the U.S.

The arrest was preceded by the publication of an analytical report titled "An oligarchic coup is being prepared in Russia", prepared under the guidance of political strategist Stanislav Belkovsky, in which the Yukos leadership was accused of preparing a "plot of oligarchs" to overthrow Putin and establish a presidential-parliamentary republic in Russia instead of a presidential one. It was for this reason that Khodorkovsky and his colleagues allegedly sponsored several political parties at once - Yabloko, the Union of Right Forces, the Communist Party of the Russian Federation (although they refused to allocate money to United Russia), maintained close ties with journalists from various publications, and financed the annual Energy Prize and many educational programs.

=== Reactions in Russia and abroad ===
Initially news of Khodorkovsky's arrest had a significant effect on the share price of Yukos. The Moscow stock market was closed for the first time ever for an hour to ensure stable trading as prices collapsed. Russia's currency, the ruble, was also hit as some foreign investors questioned the stability of the Russian market. Media reaction in Moscow was almost universally negative in blanket coverage, some of the more enthusiastic pro-business press discussed the end of capitalism, while even the government-owned press criticised the "absurd" method of Khodorkovsky's arrest.

Yukos moved quickly to replace Khodorkovsky with a Russian-born U.S. citizen, Simon Kukes. Kukes, who became the CEO of Yukos, was already an experienced oil executive.

The U.S. State Department said Khodorkovsky's arrest "raised a number of concerns over the arbitrary use of the judicial system" and was likely to be very damaging to foreign investment in Russia, as it appeared there were "selective" prosecutions occurring against Yukos officials but not against others.

A week after the arrest, the Prosecutor-General froze Khodorkovsky's shares in Yukos to prevent Khodorkovsky from selling his shares although he retained all the shares' voting rights and received dividends. In 2003, Khodorkovsky's shares in Yukos passed to Jacob Rothschild under a deal that they had concluded prior to Khodorkovsky's arrest.

On 28 June 2005, the Izvestia newspaper published as an advertisement a "letter of the fifty" - "Appeal of cultural figures, scientists, members of the public in connection with the verdict passed on the former leaders of the Yukos Oil Company", expressing support for the guilty verdict. The authors of the letter expressed dissatisfaction with the fact that "the voices of those who doubt the fairness of the decisions made sounded with renewed vigor", and the discussion of the verdict, in their opinion, "has the character of discrediting the entire judicial system, the state, and society and calls into question the foundations of law and order in the country". On 11 September 2009, four years after the publication of the "letter of the fifty", the famous figure skater Irina Rodnina stated that she did not put her signature under this letter and condemned the very form of such an appeal. Another of the signatories, Anastasia Volochkova, on 2 February 2011, in an interview with Radio Liberty, explained her signature as a misunderstanding and that United Russia misled her about the letter's content. As part of the same Radio Liberty project, on 4 February 2011, Alexander Buinov expressed regret about his signature under this letter: "I have a feeling that I got into trouble then. In any case, there are insane acts that I am ashamed of ... If the interview with Radio Liberty is enough for my abdication, I am ready to say it now."

=== The first trial, 2004–2005 ===
The charges against Khodorkovsky and his associates were that, in 1994, while chairman of Menatep, he "created an organized group of individuals with the intention of taking control of the shares in Russian companies during the privatisation process through deceit." This was with particular reference to supposedly "illegal actions" he had taken in the privatisation of the State-owned mining and fertiliser company Apatit.

Khodorkovsky's longtime business partner, Platon Lebedev, was arrested on 2 July 2003, and they were put on trial together. A few weeks later, Yukos's security head Alexei Pichugin was arrested and became the subject of a separate prosecution. Leonid Nevzlin of Menatep reportedly suggested at this moment that he and Khodorkovsky should

"leave the country and try to bargain from a position of freedom. We should take our money out and start a new business and a new life."

Nevzlin did just that and moved to Israel. Khodorkovsky remained in Russia. "In his value system, fleeing the country once Lebedev was in jail would have been immoral", Gessen wrote, "regardless of whether he could do anything to help his friend." Instead, Khodorkovsky began to give speeches arguing that Russia must modernize socially and espouse an open and transparent economy, promoting technology over purely natural resources.

Khodorkovsky was defended in court by an experienced team led by Yury Schmidt and including Karinna Moskalenko. The prosecutors claimed they were operating independently of the presidential administration. The Prosecutor-General, Vladimir Ustinov, was appointed by the former President Boris Yeltsin. He was not seen as particularly close to Putin, who had once tried to remove him. However, he was politically ambitious and prosecuting Russia's most prominent and successful tycoon was perceived as a boost to his political career and intended candidacy for the Duma.

The first Khodorkovsky-Lebedev trial lasted 10 months. There were few defense witnesses, noted Gessen, "not only because the court turned down most of its motions but also because the prosecution's case seemed so flimsy." Also, it was perceived as risky to testify for the defense. "Ten people affiliated with Yukos, including two lawyers, had already been arrested. Nine more had evaded arrest only by fleeing the country."

Khodorkovsky and Lebedev were both declared guilty and sentenced to nine years in penal colonies. The verdict of the trial, repeating the prosecutors' indictments almost verbatim, was 662 pages long. As is customary in Russian trials, the judges read the verdict aloud, beginning on 16 May 2005 and finishing on 31 May. Khodorkovsky's lawyers alleged that it was read as slowly as possible to minimize public attention.

==== Independent support ====
Khodorkovsky received support from independent third parties who believed that he was a victim of a politicized judicial system. On 29 November 2004, the Council of Europe Parliamentary Assembly (PACE) Committee on Legal Affairs and Human Rights published a report, which concluded, "the circumstances of the arrest and prosecution of leading Yukos executives suggest that the interest of the State's action in these cases goes beyond the mere pursuit of criminal justice, to include such elements as to weaken an outspoken political opponent, to intimidate other wealthy individuals and to regain control of strategic economic assets."

In addition, Khodorkovsky has received admiration and support from members of the UK parliament who have noted the decline of human rights in Russia.

In June 2009, the Council of Europe published a report which criticized the Russian government's handling of the Yukos case, entitled "Allegations of Politically Motivated Abuses of the Criminal Justice System in Council of Europe Member States":

"The Yukos affair epitomises this authoritarian abuse of the system. I wish to recall here the excellent work done by Sabine Leutheusser-Schnarrenberger, rapporteur of the Committee on Legal Affairs and Human Rights, in her two reports on this subject. I do not intend to comment on the ins and outs of this case which saw Yukos, a privately owned oil company, made bankrupt and broken up for the benefit of the state owned company Rosneft. The assets were bought at auction by a rather obscure financial group, Baikalfinansgroup, for almost €7 billion. It is still not known who is behind this financial group. A number of experts believe that the state-owned company Gazprom had a hand in the matter. The former heads of Yukos, Mikhail Khodorkovsky and Platon Lebedev, were sentenced to eight years' imprisonment for fraud and tax evasion. Vasiliy Aleksanyan, former vice-chairman of the company, who is suffering from Aids, was released on bail in January 2009 after being held in inhuman conditions condemned by the European Court of Human Rights.3 Lastly, Svetlana Bakhmina, deputy head of Yukos's legal department, who was sentenced in 2005 to six and a half years' imprisonment for tax fraud, saw her application for early release turned down in October 2008, even though she had served half of her sentence, had expressed "remorse" and was seven months pregnant. Thanks to the support of thousands of people around the world and the personal intervention of the United States President, George W. Bush, she was released in April 2009 after giving birth to a girl on 28 November 2008."

Statements of support for Khodorkovsky and criticism of the state's persecution have been passed by the Italian Parliament, the German Bundestag, and the U.S. House of Representatives, among many other official bodies.

In June 2010, Elie Wiesel, a Holocaust survivor and human rights activist, began a campaign to raise awareness of Khodorkovsky's trial and advocate for his release.

In November 2010, Amnesty International Germany began a petition campaign demanding that President Medvedev get an independent review of all criminal charges against Khodorkovsky, to coincide with the 60th anniversary of the European Convention on Human Rights. On 24 May 2011, Amnesty International criticized Lebedev and Khodorkovsky's second trial, named them prisoners of conscience, and called for their release on the expiry of their initial sentences.

A two-hour documentary about his plight was released in 2011.

Yelena Bonner, the widow of Andrei Sakharov, never stopped defending Khodorkhovsky: "I think that any person becomes a political prisoner if the law is applied to him selectively, and this is an absolutely clear case. This is a glaringly lawless action."

A cartoonist present at the trial created a cartoon series depicting the events. These cartoons compared Khodorkovsky's trial to the trial of Franz Kafka's The Trial. As of August 2015, these cartoons are on display at the Dox Gallery of Prague.

=== In prison ===
On 30 May 2005, Mikhail Khodorkovsky was sentenced to nine years in a medium security prison. At the time, he was detained at Matrosskaya Tishina, a prison in Moscow. On 1 August 2005, a political essay written by Khodorkovsky in his prison cell, titled "Left Turn", was published in Vedomosti, calling for a turn to a more socially responsible state. He stated:

"The next Russian administration will have to include the Communist Party of the Russian Federation and the Motherland Party, or the historical successors to these parties. The left-wing liberals, including Yabloko, and right-wing Ryzhkov, Khakamada and others should decide whether to join the broad social-democratic coalition or to remain grumpy and without relevance on the political sidelines. In my opinion, they have to join because only the broadest composition of a coalition in which liberal-socialist (social-democratic) views will play the key role can save us from the emergence, in the process of this turn to the left turn, from a new ultra-authoritarian regime. The new Russian authorities will have to address a left-wing agenda and meet an irrepressible demand by the people for justice. This will mean in the first instance the problems of legalizing privatization and restoring paternalistic programs and approaches in several areas."

On 19 August 2005, Khodorkovsky announced that he was on a hunger strike in protest against his friend and associate Platon Lebedev's placement in the punishment cell of the jail. According to Khodorkovsky, Lebedev had diabetes mellitus and heart problems, and keeping him in the punishment cell would be equivalent to murder.

On 31 August 2005, he announced that he would run for parliament. This initiative was made possible by the legal loophole: a convicted felon cannot vote or stand for a parliament, but if his case is lodged with the Court of Appeal he still enjoys all electoral rights. Usually it takes around a year for an appeal to make its way through the Appeal Court, so there should have been enough time for Khodorkovsky to be elected. For a member of Russian parliament to be imprisoned, the parliament needs to vote to lift his or her immunity. Thus he had a hope of avoiding prosecution. But the Court of Appeal, unusually, took only a couple of weeks to process Khodorkovsky's appeal, reducing his sentence by one year and invalidating any electoral plans on his part until the end of his sentence.

As reported on 20 October 2005, Khodorkovsky was delivered to the labor camp YaG-14/10 (Russian: Исправительное учреждение общего режима ЯГ-14/10) in the town of Krasnokamensk in Zabaykalsky Krai. The labor camp is adjacent to a uranium mine, which it once served. Khodorkovsky was put to work in the colony's mitten factory. He slept in a barracks and often spent his days in a cold solitary cell in retribution for his supposed violating of various rules.

The second part of Khodorkovsky's essay "Left Turn" was published in Kommersant on 11 November 2005, in which he expressed social democratic views.

On 13 April 2006, Khodorkovsky was attacked by prison inmate Alexander Kuchma while he was asleep after a heated conversation. Kuchma cut Khodorkovsky's face with a knife and said that it was a response to sexual advances by the businessman. Western media accused the Russian authorities of trying to play down the incident. In January 2009, the same prisoner filed a lawsuit for 500,000 rubles (about $15,000) against Khodorkovsky, accusing him of homosexual harassment. Kuchma said in an interview that he was compelled to attack Khodorkovsky by two officers, beaten and threatened with death to commit the attack. In 2011, Kuchma admitted that he had been told to attack Khodorkovsky "by unknown persons who had come to the prison colony and beaten and threatened him."

On 5 February 2007, new charges of embezzlement and money laundering were brought against both Khodorkovsky and Platon Lebedev. Khodorkovsky's supporters pointed out that the charges came just months before Khodorkovsky and Lebedev were to become eligible for parole, as well as a year before the next Russian presidential election.

On 28 January 2008, Khodorkovsky began a hunger strike to help his associate Vasily Aleksanyan, who is ill and was held in jail and who was denied the medical treatment he needed. Aleksanyan was transferred from a pre-trial prison to an oncological hospital on 8 February 2008, after which Khodorkovsky called off his strike.

"No single cause has done more than Khodorkovsky's to inspire Russian speakers everywhere", Gessen wrote in 2012. "Three of Russia's best-selling writers have published their correspondence with Khodorkovsky; composers have dedicated symphonies to him, a dozen artists attended his trial and put together an exhibition of courtroom drawings." Gessen noted that "a group of Soviet-born classical musicians traveled to Strasbourg to mount a concert in honor of Khodorkovsky." While Khodorkovsky was imprisoned, Arvo Pärt, the Estonian composer, wrote his Symphony no. 4, and dedicated it to him. The symphony had its premiere on 10 January 2009 in Los Angeles at the Walt Disney Concert Hall, under the direction of Esa-Pekka Salonen.

Khodorkovsky spent more than half of his prison time in the Matrosskaya Tishina Detention Facility in Moscow, where, according to Gessen, "living conditions are far more punishing than those in a distant penal colony." Yet, Gessen noted, he "declined to describe" in any detail the conditions under which he was imprisoned, "arguing that he is no different from other inmates."

In prison, Khodorkovsky announced that he would research and write a PhD dissertation on the topic of Russian oil policy. The third part of Khodorkovsky's essay/thesis "Left Turn" with the subheading "Global Perestroika" was published in Vedomosti on 7 November 2008. In it he stated:

"Barack Obama's victory in the US presidential elections is not simply the latest change of power in one individual country, albeit a superpower. We are standing on the threshold of a change in the paradigm of world development. The era whose foundations were laid by Ronald Reagan and Margaret Thatcher three decades ago is ending. Unconditionally including myself in that part of society that has liberal views, I see: ahead – is a Turn to the Left."

In May 2010, Khodorkovsky went on a two-day hunger-strike to protest what he said was a violation of the recent law against imprisonment of persons accused of financial crimes. The law was pushed by President Medvedev after the death of Sergei Magnitsky who died in pre-trial detention in a Moscow prison in 2009.

On appeal, Khodorkovsky and Platon Lebedev's sentences were reduced from 11 years to 10 years and 10 months meaning they could be released in August 2014 and May 2014, respectively. Khodorkovsky's appeal read: "In this case, the usual mantra that everything is legal and well-grounded just won't do."

He wrote a book, My Fellow Prisoners, detailing his time incarcerated. Khodorkovsky has spoken about how his incarceration has changed his "value system" in life, and that there are now, for an example, more important things for him than business pursuits.

=== Political transformation ===
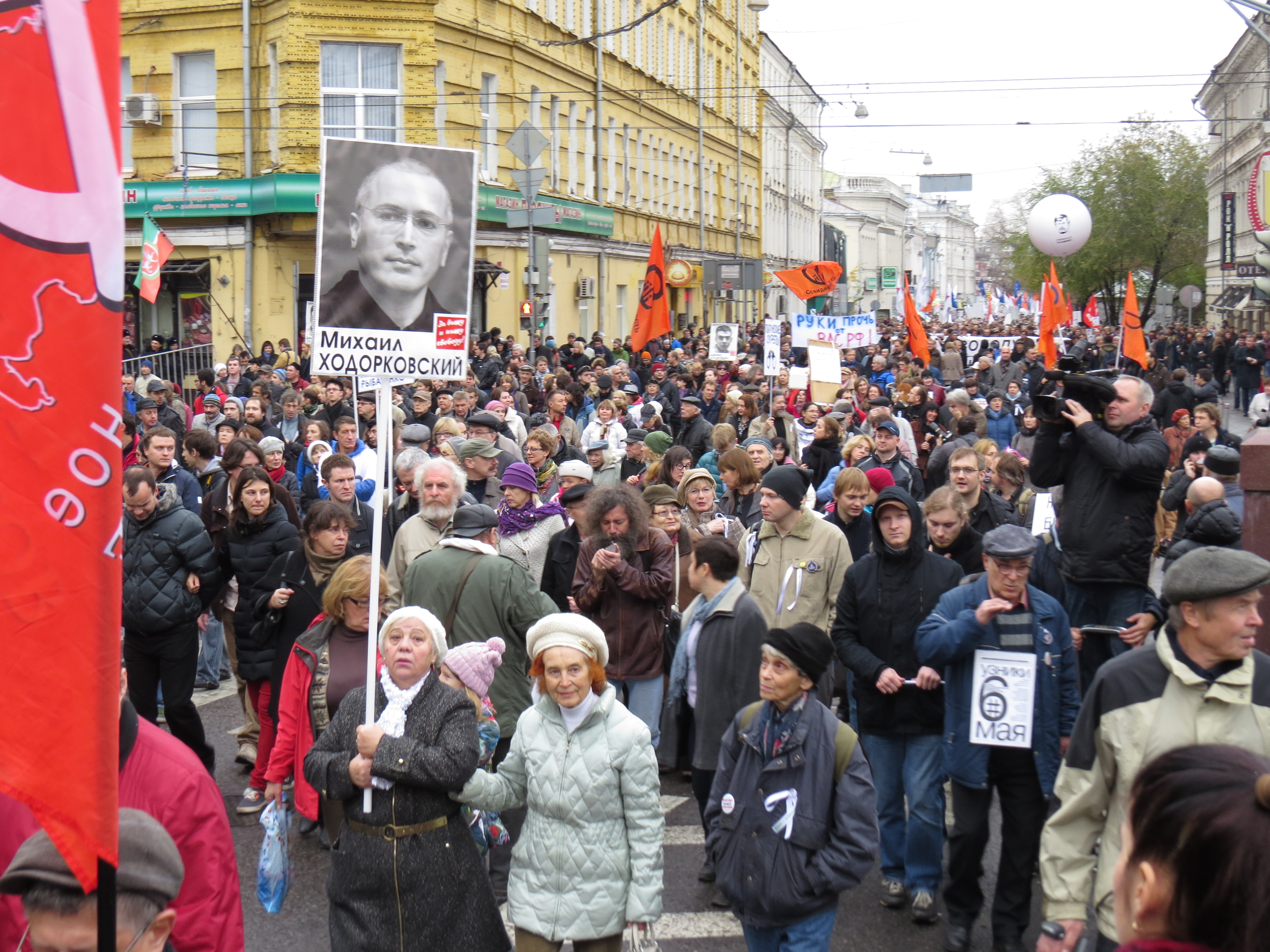
Rally in support of political prisoners in Russia, Moscow on 27 October 2013

The Economist asserted in April 2010 that after six years in prison, Khodorkovsky had politically transformed from an oligarch into a political prisoner and freedom fighter: "He speaks with the authority of a chief executive of what was once Russia's largest oil company. He explains how Yukos and Russia's oil industry functioned, but he goes beyond business matters. What he is defending is not his long-lost business, but his human rights. The transformation of Mr. Khodorkovsky from a ruthless oligarch, operating in a virtually lawless climate, into a political prisoner and freedom fighter is one of the more intriguing tales in post-communist Russia."

Khodorkovsky asserts his political transformation in many of his own writings from prison. On 26 October 2009, he published a response to Dmitri Medvedev's "Forward, Russia!" article in Vedomosti, arguing that "authoritarianism in its current Russian form does not meet many key humanitarian requirements customary for any country that wishes to consider itself modern and European."

In a 28 January 2010, op-ed for the New York Times and International Herald Tribune, Khodorkovsky argued that "Russia must make a historic choice. Either we turn back from the dead end toward which we have been heading in recent years – and we do it soon – or else we continue in this direction and Russia in its current form simply ceases to exist."

On 3 March 2010, Khodorkovsky published an article in Nezavisimaya Gazeta about the "conveyor belt" of Russian justice. In this article, he states that the "siloviki conveyor belt, which has undermined justice is truly the gravedigger of modern Russian statehood. Because it turns many thousands of the country's most active, sensible and independent citizens against this statehood – with enviable regularity."

In conclusion, The Economist opined, "any talk by the Kremlin of the rule of law or about modernisation will be puffery so long as Mr Khodorkovsky remains in jail."

=== Second trial, 2009–2010 ===
==== Charges ====
Khodorkovsky became eligible for parole after having served half of his original sentence, however, in February 2007, state prosecutors began to prepare new charges of embezzlement, leading up to a second trial which began in March 2009.

Prosecutors filed new charges against Khodorkovsky, alleging that he stole 350 million tons of oil, charges which Kommersant described as "Compared with the previous version, only stylistic inaccuracy has been improved, and some of the paragraphs have been swapped." Others pointed out that the new charges were impossible given that he was previously convicted on tax evasion of the same allegedly stolen oil. According to Khodorkovsky's lawyer Karinna Moskalenko, "The position of the prosecutors is also self-contradictory. ... Khodorkovsky is now serving a sentence for tax evasion, and if they are asserting that he stole all the oil his company produced, what did he go to prison for the first time if there was nothing to be taxed?"

"If the first set of charges was thin, the second was absurd", Gessen later wrote. "Khodorkovsky and Lebedev were now accused of having stolen all the oil that Yukos had produced in the years 1998 to 2003." At the end of the trial, in December 2010, both defendants were sentenced to 14 years' imprisonment. Gessen cited leading Russian lawyers as saying that Russian laws had been "passed specifically to enable [Khodorkovsky's] persecution, or adjusted retroactively to sustain it." Many former Yukos employees were arrested and imprisoned and were therefore unemployable after their release, and Khodorkovsky "tried to provide financial support to those who have not found a way to make a living."

Khodorkovsky delivered his own summation at his second trial. He spoke of his countrymen's hopes "that Russia will finally become a land of freedom and the law, and the law will be more important than the bureaucrats", a country where "human rights will no longer be contingent on the whim of the czar, whether he be kind or mean. Where the government will be accountable to the people and the courts will be accountable only to God and the law." He said, "I am not an ideal man, far from it. But I am a man of ideas. Like anyone, I have a hard time living in prison and I do not want to die here. But I will, if I need to, without a second thought."

During a visit to Moscow in July 2009, President Barack Obama said: "it does seem odd to me that these new charges, which appear to be a repackaging of the old charges, should be surfacing now, years after these two individuals have been in prison and as they become eligible for parole."

The verdict was originally scheduled for 15 December, but was delayed without explanation until 27 December. Just a few days before the verdict was read by the judge before the court, Vladimir Putin made public comments with regard to his opinion of Khodorkovsky's guilt, saying "a thief should sit in jail".

On 14 January 2020, the European Court of Human Rights ruled that Russia violated Article 6, Article 7 and Article 8 of the European Convention on Human Rights.

==== Judicial controversy ====
On 14 February 2011, Natalya Vasilyeva, an assistant to Judge Viktor Danilkin, said that the judge did not write the verdict, and had read it against his will. Essentially, Natalya Vasilyeva said the judge's verdict was "brought from the Moscow City Court".

In her statement she also noted that "everyone in the judicial community understands perfectly that this is a rigged case, a fixed trial". On 24 February Vasilyeva underwent a polygraph test, which indicated that she likely believes that Danilkin acted under pressure. Judge Danilkin responded that "the assertion by Natalya Vasilyeva was nothing more than slander".

=== Appeal and Amnesty International statement ===
On 24 May 2011, Khodorkovsky's appeal hearing was held, and Judge Danilkin rejected the challenge. Following the rejection of the appeal, the human rights group Amnesty International declared Khodorkovsky and Lebedev as "prisoners of conscience", remarking in a statement that "Whatever the rights and wrongs of Mikhail Khodorkovsky and Platon Lebedev's first convictions there can no longer be any doubt that their second trial was deeply flawed and politically motivated." On 25 October 2013, the Berlin International Literature Festival held a worldwide reading in solidarity with Mikhail Khodorkovsky, Platon Lebedev and all political prisoners in Russia.

In June 2011, Khodorkovsky was sent to prison colony No. 7 of Segezha, in the northern region of Karelia near the Finnish border.

=== Release ===
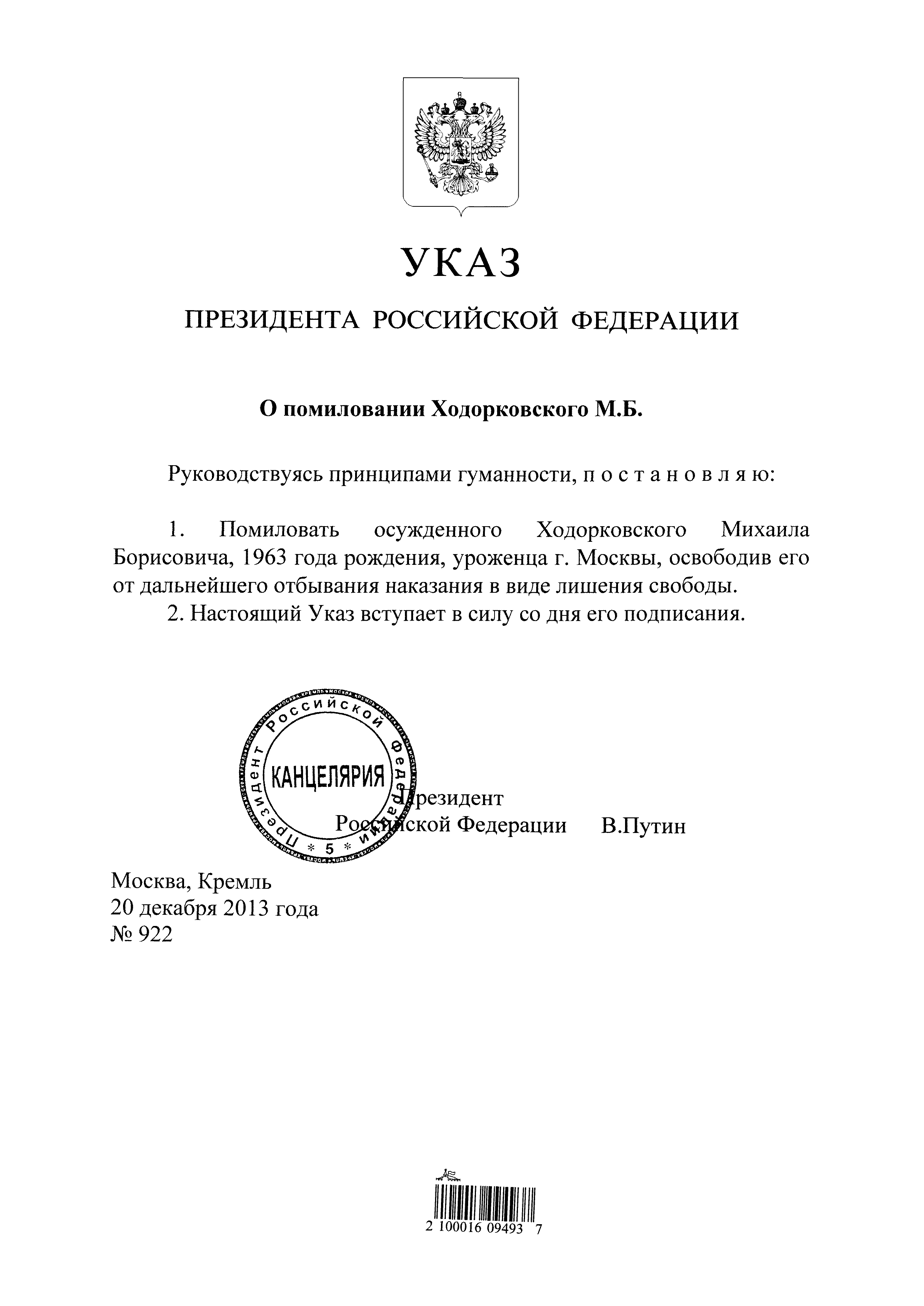
Presidential Decree No. 922 granting pardon to Mikhail Khodorkovsky on 20 December 2013

According to his official site, Khodorkovsky would have been eligible for early release, but an alleged conspiracy involving jail guards and a cellmate resulted in a statement that he had violated one of the prison rules. This was sufficient for him to forfeit his rights, once the statement was logged in his file.

It was predicted that he might be released by the middle of 2011, although Khodorkovsky was found guilty on 27 December 2010 of fresh charges of embezzlement and money laundering, which had the potential of leading to a new sentence of up to 22.5 years. "The second as well as the first case were organized by Igor Sechin", he said in an interview with The Sunday Times from a remand prison in the Siberian city of Chita, 4,000 miles (6,400 km) east of Moscow.

On 22 August 2008, he was denied parole by Judge Igor Faliliyev, at the Ingodinsky district court in Chita, Zabaykalsky Krai. The basis for this was in part because Khodorkovsky "refused to attend jail sewing classes".

In the second trial, the prosecutors asked the judge for a 14-year sentence, which was just one year less than the maximum. The judge, Danilkin, handed down the verdict on 30 December 2010 in which he upheld the prosecutors' statements. Taking into account the time already served, Khodorkovsky was to be released in 2017. U.S. President Barack Obama, German Chancellor Angela Merkel, and British Foreign Secretary William Hague condemned or expressed concern over Khodorkovsky's extended sentence. The White House said it brought Russia's legal system into question.

On 15 February 2011, Vyacheslav Lebedev, chairman of Russia's Supreme Court, suggested reviving an old Soviet practice under which a maximum sentence for a person charged with different crimes should not exceed the sentence attached to the most serious charge: in Khodorkovsky's case, nine years. Since he has been in jail since October 2003, this would have meant releasing him in October 2012, which did not happen.

On 5 March 2012, the day after Putin won his third term as president of Russia, President Medvedev ordered a review of Khodorkovsky's sentence.

In December 2012, a Moscow court reduced Khodorkovsky's prison sentence by two years, so that he was due to be released in 2014. In the same court case Khodorkovsky's business partner Platon Lebedev had his prison sentence reduced by two years. The 2010 case would have had them released 13 years after the day of their arrests in 2003.

==== Upon release from prison (2013) ====
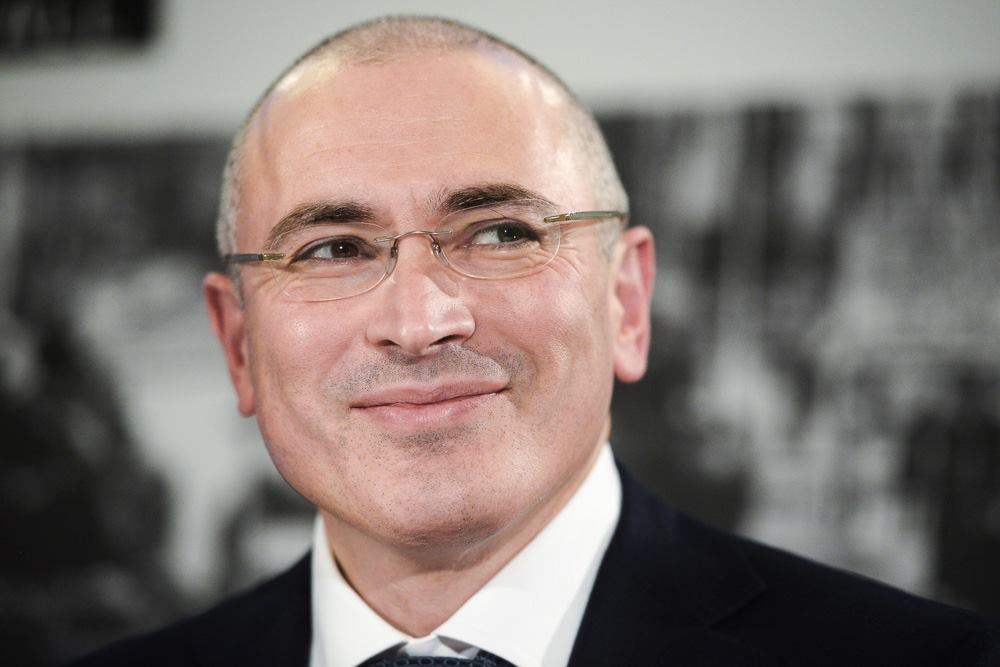
Khodorkovsky in 2013, after release

On 19 December 2013, president Vladimir Putin said he intended to pardon Khodorkovsky in the near future. He did so on the following day, stating that Khodorkovsky's mother was ill and Khodorkovsky had asked for clemency. Putin also felt that ten years in jail was still "a significant punishment". Some opposition leaders suggested that the upcoming 2014 Winter Olympics in Sochi might have played a role in the granting of the pardon. His guards told him to pack his things and he was flown at once to St. Petersburg, where he was given "a parka and a passport" and, switching planes on the tarmac, put on a flight to Berlin. The Guardian reported in December 2014 that Khodorkovsky had "promised Putin three things in a handwritten letter" in which he asked to be freed: "that he would leave Russia to spend time with his family, would stay away from politics, and would not attempt to win back his shares in Yukos ... or get involved in any court cases." However Khodorkovsky maintains that he had made no such promise.

After gaining his freedom, Khodorkovsky released a written statement in which he thanked former German foreign minister Hans-Dietrich Genscher, who had played a critical role in diplomatic negotiations, for securing his release.

On 22 December 2013, two days after his release, he appeared at a news conference at the Checkpoint Charlie Museum in Berlin. Reporting on his comments, the Associated Press stated that "The 50-year-old appeared composed at his first public appearance since his release, saying he shouldn't be viewed as a symbol that there are no more political prisoners in Russia. He added that he would do 'all I can do' to ensure the release of others." He again thanked Genscher, as well as the media, and German chancellor Angela Merkel, for their roles in securing his release. On 24 December, Khodorkovsky was interviewed in his Berlin hotel room on the BBC television program Hardtalk.

After his release Khodorkovsky acknowledged the support he had received from the Swiss Federal Court which ruled in 2008 against the release of documents to the Russian authorities, that tied him and Yukos, the largest Russian oil company at the time, to prominent banks and financial institutions. The Swiss court argued that handing over the documents would endanger his chance for a fair trial. Khodorkovsky also has personal ties to Switzerland where his wife Inna and two of his children reside. Soon after his step to freedom, he applied for a Swiss visa, which would allow him to travel to most European countries. This visa was approved by Swiss authorities, and Khodorkovsky arrived in Basel, Switzerland, on 5 January 2014. Yukos shareholders were awarded $50 billion in compensation by the Permanent Arbitration Court in The Hague in July 2014, however Khodorkovsky was not a party to the legal action. In 2015, he moved to London.

On 23 December 2015, a Russian court issued an international arrest warrant for Khodorkovsky whom the Investigative Committee of Russia charged with ordering the murder of Vladimir Petukhov, the mayor of Nefteyugansk, who was murdered in June 1998. Speaking on the same day on BBC, which claimed Khodorkovsky "spent much of his time in London", he said he was "definitely considering" applying for political asylum in the UK and felt safe in London.

In December 2016, a court unfroze $100m of Khodorkovsky's assets that had been held in Ireland.

== Life in exile (2013–present) ==
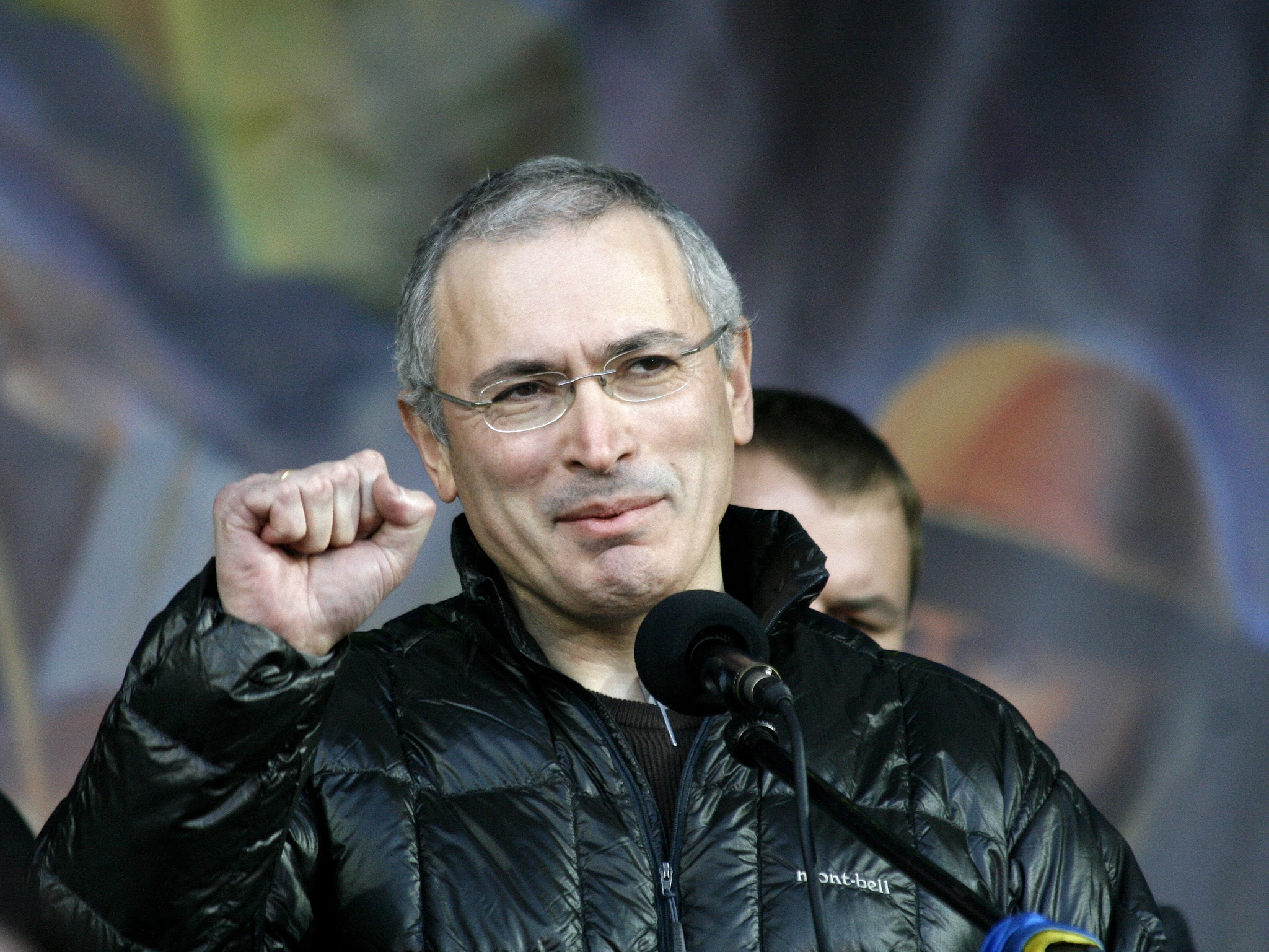
Khodorkovsky speaking at Euromaidan in Kyiv, Ukraine, 9 March 2014

Following his pardon and release from prison on 20 December 2013 at the same time as members of the protest group Pussy Riot, Khodorkovsky made only a few public appearances until the revolution broke out in Ukraine. On 9 March 2014, in the wake of the Russian annexation of Crimea, Khodorkovsky spoke at Maidan Nezalezhnosti in Kyiv, where he accused the Russian government of complicity in the killing of protesters.

In March 2014, Khodorkovsky was presented with the "Man of the Year" award by the Polish newspaper Gazeta Wyborcza. Khodorkovsky also delivered keynote speeches at the Le Monde Festival, the Freedom House Awards Dinner, the Council on Foreign Relations, the Oslo Freedom Forum, Forum 2000, the Vilnius Forum, Chatham House, the World Economic Forum, Stanford University, and the Atlantic Council.

In May 2014, Khodorkovsky was praised by former Polish president Lech Wałęsa and received an award for his efforts to reform Russian civil society.

Khodorkovsky's mother died in the summer of 2014.

In July 2014, Permanent Court of Arbitration in The Hague ruled the Russian government deliberately bankrupted Yukos to seize its assets and ordered it to repay Yukos shareholders a sum of roughly $50 billion. Roughly 30,000 former Yukos employees were to receive a large pension from the government. As of January 2015 the Russian government has not made any payments to Yukos shareholders or employees. On 20 April 2016 the District Court of The Hague quashed the decisions of the Permanent Court of Arbitration, ruling that it had no jurisdiction as provisional application of the Energy Charter Treaty arbitration clause violated Russian law.

On 20 September 2014, Khodorkovsky officially relaunched the Open Russia movement, with a live teleconference broadcast featuring groups of civil society activists and pro-democracy opposition in Kaliningrad, St Petersburg, Voronezh and Ekaterinburg, among others. According to media around the time of the launch event, Open Russia was intended to unite pro-European Russians in a bid to challenge Putin's grip on power. Khodorkovsky said that the organization would promote independent media, political education, rule of law, support for activists and journalists, free and fair elections, and a program to reform law enforcement and the Russian judicial system. He said that Putin's actions were "clearly leading Russia along the patriarchal Asian path to development" and called the State Duma “a bulwark of reactionaries”. He said that Open Russia was willing to support any candidate that sought to develop Russia along the European model.

In October 2014, Khodorkovsky visited the U.S., delivering the keynote address at a Washington, D.C., meeting of Freedom House and giving a speech at the Council on Foreign Relations in New York. In the latter speech he among other things lamented the fact that "a picture of the West as a sort of moral example for ourselves" had "in the past ten to twenty years become much, much more blurry." He also said at Freedom House that "Russia has been wasting time these past 10 years... Now is when we must begin to make up this lost time."

A 3 October 2014, article in the Wall Street Journal stated that Khodorkovsky planned "to bring about a constitutional conference that would shift power away from the Russian presidency and toward the legislature and judiciary." During his U.S. trip, he said, "The question of Russian power won't be decided by democratic elections—forget about this. ... This is why, when we speak of strategic tasks, I speak of a constitutional conference that will redistribute power from the president" to other branches of government.

On 2 December 2014, Khodorkovsky addressed the European Parliament.

Khodorkovsky's book My Fellow Prisoners, a collection of sketches about his life in prison, was published in 2014. John Lloyd of the Financial Times called it "vivid, humane and poignant".

In December 2014, The Guardian reported that Khodorkovsky, living in Zurich, was "plotting the downfall of the man who put him behind bars for a decade." The newspaper cited him as claiming that Russian intelligence services were monitoring his communications. In early 2015, he told CNN that he held no desire to run for the presidency, or had any political ambition, although he still held ambitions of social changes; he called his efforts "civic activity" and not politics.

In March 2015, Khodorkovsky, along with other opposition figures, was a subject of attacks by a shadowy organization known as Glavplakat. The attacks included anonymous posters and banners flown across Russian cities likening opposition figures to unsavoury characters from history or labeling them as traitors to Russia. It has yet to be determined who is behind the organization, and opposition figures are concerned over the attacks.

In August 2015, the Kremlin summoned Khodorkovsky's father for questioning. On 7 December 2015, Khodorkovsky received an official summons from the Russian Investigative Committee.

In September 2016, Khodorkovsky launched an "Instead of Putin" website where visitors can vote for alternatives to Putin.

In November 2017, Khodorkovsky launched the Dossier Center, which seeks to map the network of people operating in support of Putin.

On 20 May 2022, following the Russian invasion of Ukraine, Khodorkovsky was designated as a 'foreign agent' by the Ministry of Justice of the Russian Federation. Also in May 2022, Khodorkovsky participated in the 8th "Russia Forum" in Vilnius, together with former Russian Prime Minister Mikhail Kasyanov, the head of the US-think tank Freedom House, the head of the US-government funded broadcaster Radio Free Europe and others. The aim of the "anti-Putin summit" was to develop a strategy on how to "deputise" Russia and "slay the Russian bear", meaning Vladimir Putin. The parliament, and not the president, should exercise power in Russia, Khodorkovsky said in Vilnius, adding that the end of Putin’s government “will not be long in coming”.

In November 2022 Khodorkovsky published on the internet, a book in both Russian and English languages entitled "HOW DO YOU SLAY A DRAGON? A Manual for Start-Up Revolutionaries".

On 30 April 2023 Khodorkovsky and a large group of exiles, among whom were Dmitry Gudkov, Ilya Ponomarev, Garry Kasparov, Leonid Gozman, Kirill Rogov, Ivan Preobrazhensky, Evgeny Chichvarkin, Boris Zimin, Sergey Guriev, Andrei Illarionov, Mark Feigin, Elena Lukyanova, Marat Gelman, Evgenia Chirikova, Anastasia Shevchenko as well as some 50 others, met in Berlin and signed a joint declaration "in which they declared their commitment to fundamental positions, the first of which is the criminal nature of the Russian war against Ukraine." The Putin regime was "illegitimate and criminal", and stated that for this reason it "must be eliminated". The document was entitled "Declaration of Russia’s Democratic Forces", and published in the form of a petition on Change.org.

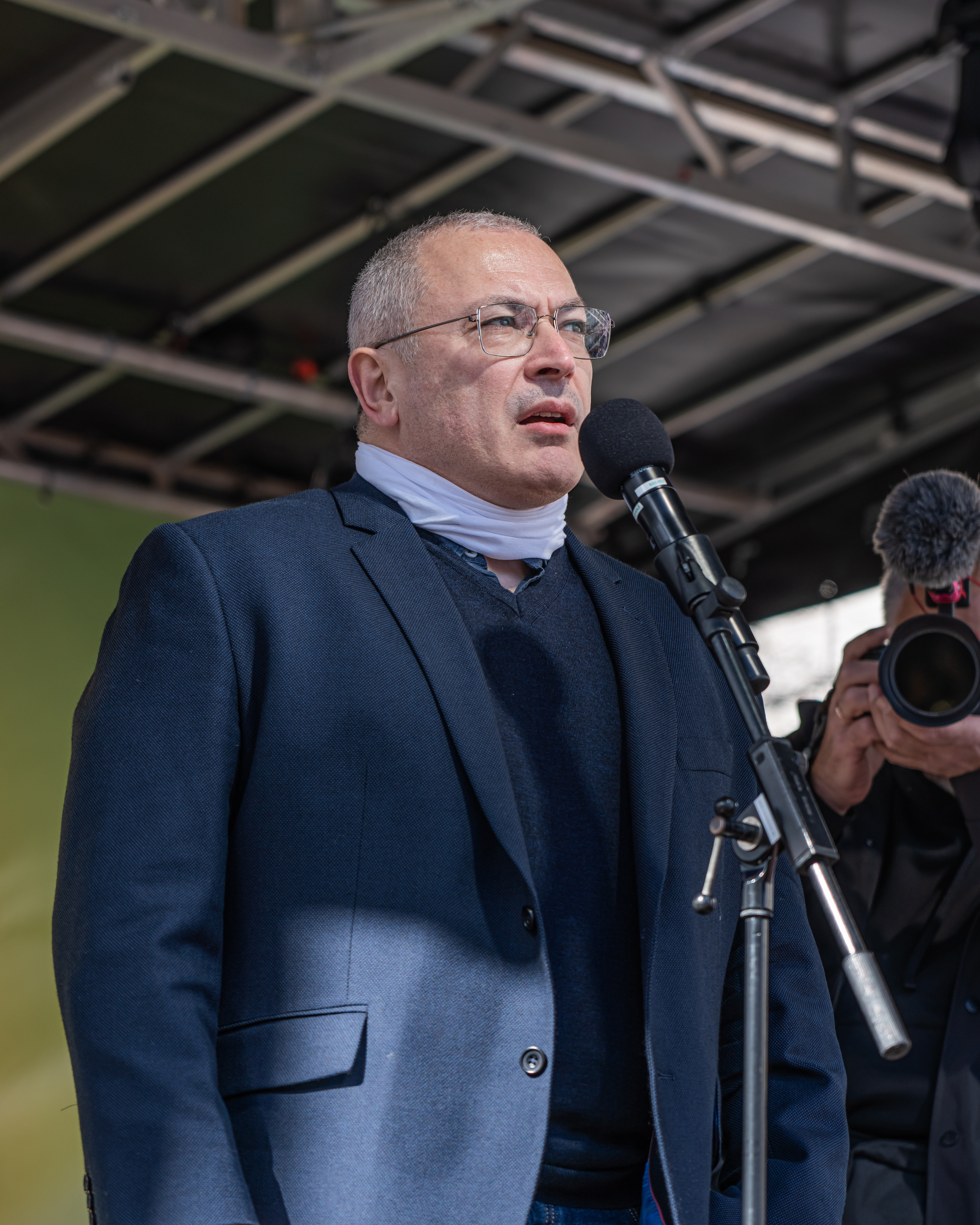
Khodorkovsky speaking at a Russian rally on Noon Against Putin in front of the Embassy of Russia, Berlin, 17 March 2024

On 24 June 2023, Khodorkovsky wrote in support of the Wagner Group mutiny, urging citizens to give the mutineers gasoline and for their opponents not to fight against the mutiny.

On 20 January 2025, Khodorkovsky posted pictures of himself at the Capital One Arena in Washington DC during the second inauguration of Donald Trump.

On 14 October 2025, he, alongside other members of the Anti-War Committee, was charged with two "terrorism" charges ("organizing a terrorist group" and "participating" in it), as well as "violent seizure of power or violent retention of power". (Mikhail Khodorkovsky specifically was also charged with "public calls to commit terrorist activities"). He faces life imprisonment and has since been added to Russia's "terrorist and extremists" lists.

In 2026, Khodorkovsky was selected to be a participant in the PACE Platform for Dialogue with Russian Democratic Forces. The platform met in Strasbourg for its first session in January 2026.

== Politics ==
Khodorkovsky is openly critical of what he refers to as "managed democracy" within Russia. Normally careful not to criticise the current leadership, he says the military and security services exercise too much authority. In 2010 he told The Times:

"It is the Singapore model, it is a term that people understand in Russia these days. It means that theoretically you have a free press, but in practice there is self-censorship. Theoretically you have courts, in practice the courts adopt decisions dictated from above. Theoretically there are civil rights enshrined in the constitution; in practice you are not able to exercise some of these rights."

Khodorkovsky promoted social programs through Yukos in regions where the company operated, one example being "New Civilization", in Angarsk, which promoted student government to young adults. The scout program incorporated aspects of student government. Participants from throughout the country spent their holidays organizing student-governed bodies at summer camps.

Masha Gessen, writing in 2012, recalled meeting Khodorkovsky in 2002, "when he met with a group of young authors to try out what would become his stump speech as he traveled the country, urging the creation of a new kind of economy in Russia, one based on intellectual rather than mineral resources."

== Relationship with Vladimir Putin ==
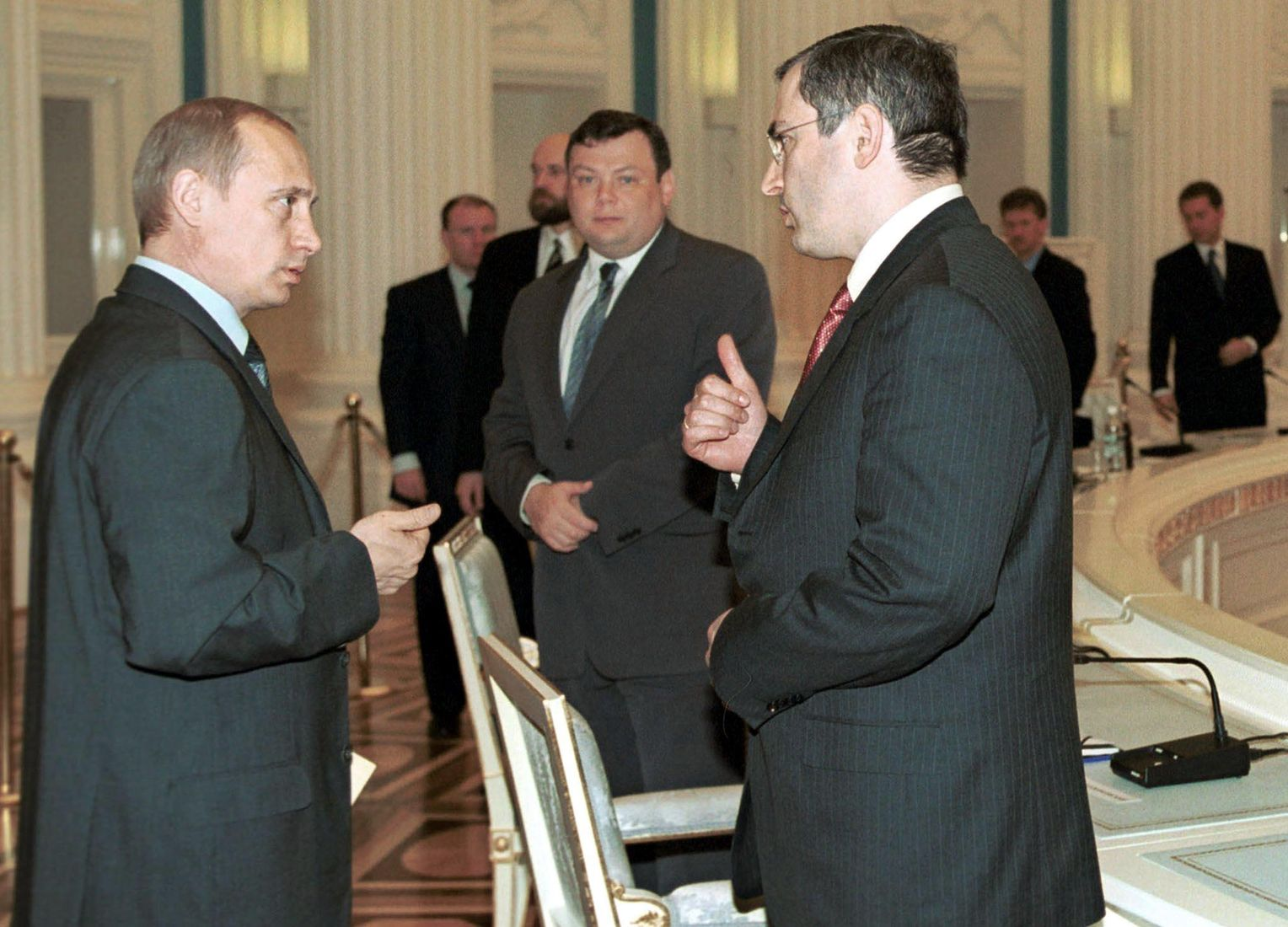
President Putin with Khodorkovsky (right), Sergei Pugachev (behind center) and Mikhail Fridman (centre), May 2001

"At the root of the conflict between Putin and Khodorkovsky", stated writer and activist Masha Gessen in April 2012, "lies a basic difference in character. Putin rarely says what he means and even less frequently trusts that others are saying what they mean. Khodorkovsky, in contrast, seems to have always taken himself and others at face value—he has constructed his identity in accordance with his convictions and his life in accordance with his identity. That is what landed him in prison and what has kept him there."

In February 2003, at a televised meeting at the Kremlin, Khodorkovsky argued with Putin about corruption. He implied that major government officials were accepting millions in bribes. In early 2012, prior to the Russian presidential election, Khodorkovsky and Putin were said to have both underestimated each other.

After being convicted for tax evasion, money-laundering, and embezzlement, Khodorkovsky maintained his innocence and said that his conviction was "retribution for financing political parties that opposed Putin".

On 20 December 2013, Putin signed a pardon freeing Khodorkovsky. Following his release, Khodorkovsky addressed the media at a news conference in Berlin, Germany. He referred to himself as a "political prisoner", and stated he would not re-enter business or politics.

Khodorkovsky stated in a December 2014 interview that he was not violating his promise to Putin to avoid politics, but was only engaged in "civil society work... politics is in essence a battle to get yourself elected, personally. I'm not interested in this. But to the question, are you ready to go through to the very end: yes, I am. I see this as my civic duty." He said he was "offering myself as a crisis manager. Because that's what I am."

== Publications ==
- 2014: My Fellow Prisoners
- 2022: How Do You Slay A Dragon? A Manual for Start-Up Revolutionaries
- 2022: The Russian Conundrum: How the West Fell for Putin's Power Gambit—And How to Fix It (with Martin Sixsmith)

== Philanthropy ==
Khodorkhovsky has been involved in various philanthropic endeavours since the beginning of the 21st century:

- Open Russia Foundation
- Khodorkovsky Foundation
- its subsidiary the Oxford Russia Fund
- the London-based Future of Russia Foundation or the Future of Russia Trust
- and the organization European Choice ("европейский выбор")

== See also ==
- Alex Gibney's 2019 film Citizen K
- Semibankirschina
