= Open Russia =

Open Russia Открытая Россия
- Leader: Mikhail Khodorkovsky
- Chairperson: Anastasiya Burakova
- Founder: Mikhail Khodorkovsky
- Founded: December 2001, relaunched 23 September 2014
- Dissolved: 22 March 2006; 27 May 2021
- TV station: MBKh Media
- Ideology: Liberalism; Anti-Putinism
- Political position: Centre
- Colours: Yellow; Black
- Slogan: "From open information to an open country" (Russian: "От открытой информации — к открытой стране")

Party flag
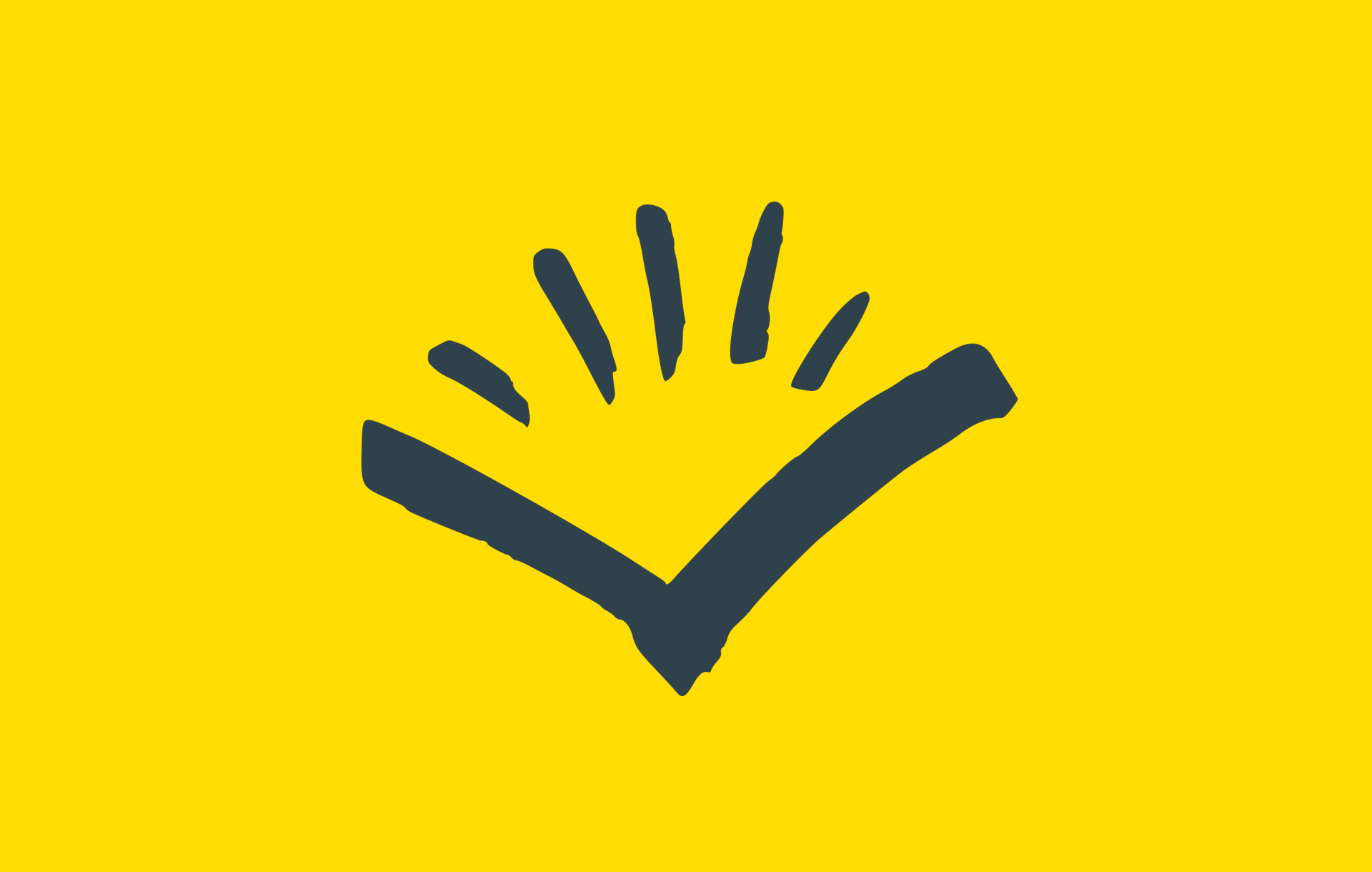

Website
- openrussia.org

Open Russia (Russian: Открытая Россия, romanized: Otkrytaya Rossiya) is a political organisation founded by the exiled Russian oligarch Mikhail Khodorkovsky with the shareholders of his firm, Yukos (a company closed in 2006). Khodorkovsky states that his organisation advocates democracy and human rights. The first initiative took the form of a foundation whose stated purpose was to "build and strengthen civil society in Russia", established in 2001. Khodorkovsky relaunched Open Russia in September 2014 as a nationwide community platform as part of a group of activities called "Open Media".

In 2017, the organisation was listed as undesirable by Russia's Prosecutor General, and its website banned in Russia. On 27 May 2021, Open Russia announced to cease its operations in Russia to protect its members from the risk of facing criminal prosecution and being imprisoned in the country. "Open Media" is now known as "Mozhem Obyasnit".

== History ==
=== First initiative ===
This first incarnation of Open Russia has been described by The Guardian as a charitable organization. Its board included Henry Kissinger and Lord Jacob Rothschild. According to the Moscow Times, the earlier incarnation of Open Russia funded “many philanthropic projects, including educational projects for young people, the Federation of Internet Education, the Club of Regional Journalism and projects of human rights NGOs.”

After Khodorkovsky's arrest in 2003, his deputy Leonid Nevzlin took over Open Russia. He was succeeded by Nikolay Bychkov.

By 2005, Open Russia had 23 regional affiliates. On February 24, 2005, Russia's Federal Tax Service initiated an inspection of Open Russia, its third such probe in 12 months, which in the opinion of Open Russia was meant "to sully the only structure left in the hands of Mikhail Khodorkovsky.” The first incarnation of Open Russia closed in 2006 when Russian authorities froze its bank accounts.

=== Second initiative ===
Open Russia was re-launched on September 20, 2014, as “a nationwide community platform designed to bring together all Russians interested in creating a better life for themselves and their children” during videoconference supporting marches against Putin's policies, with nearly all of the regional locations experiencing Internet connection problems just moments before the conference, sabotage and storming the halls"

The online relaunch ceremony was attended by prominent Russian activists and émigrés, including Sergei Guriyev and Yevgeny Chichvarkin.

The Guardian reported that Khodorkovky's relaunch of Open Russia “appears to break his promise to steer clear of politics, which he made after being pardoned by president Vladimir Putin in December.” The New York Times stated, however, that Khodorkovsky had in fact “agreed to stay out of politics until August, when he would have been released anyway. Now freed from that commitment, he is making clear that prison has, if anything, emboldened him in his desire to change his country.”

==== Objectives ====
The new Open Russia declared that it would focus on several key areas including independent media, political education, the rule of law, and support for political prisoners. Also featured is an extensive Reforms Program aimed at reforming law enforcement and the Constitution to ensure justice and democracy. In addition, Open Russia endorses free and fair elections, and, while staying out of direct political involvement, will lend support to candidates who also promote fair elections.

Interviewed in an October 2014 article in the Wall Street Journal, Khodorkovsky said he planned to use Open Russia to push for a constitutional conference that would shift power away from the presidency and toward the legislature and judiciary. This stems, from Khodorkovsky's opinion, from the root cause of Russia's problems - namely the absence of the rule of law.

==== Activities ====
On September 13–14, 2014, Open Russia presented talks by Lyudmila Ulytskaya, Arina Borodina, and Dmitry Olshansky. The foundation's Open Lecture projected a series of live talks that toured across Russia. To date there have been seven online forums hosted by Open Russia on topics ranging from healthcare reform to combating corruption.

Open Russia reported that it will support twenty-five candidates in the upcoming September parliamentary elections. Although it has yet to choose the candidates it will support, the organization has stated it already has two candidates from the Parnas party it is considering.

=== Russian state ban ===
Open Russia, along with other dissident groups, was the target of an intensified crackdown by the Russian government in the 2010s. In mid-2017, the Prosecutor General of Russia designated Open Russia as "undesirable" under the 2015 Russian undesirable organizations law, effectively banning its activities in Russia. Amnesty International noted that, while previous civil society groups had been targeted by the law, the designation of Open Russia marked the first time that the Russian government banned "a civil society group that was founded by Russians and operates only in Russia."

The group is the target of Internet censorship by the Russian authorities: in December 2017, Roskomnadzor added Open Russia's website to its registry of blocked sites.

Criminal proceedings against members of the Russian movement followed. Human Rights Watch reported in January 2020 that cases had been brought against Anastasia Shevchenko, Yana Antonova, Maxim Vernikov and other activists. It noted that members of the Russian movement denied any connection to the UK-registered organisation of the same name that had been designated undesirable in 2017. In 2020, Vernikov and Antonova were convicted of involvement in an undesirable organisation and sentenced to compulsory labour. On 18 February 2021, a court in Rostov-on-Don sentenced Shevchenko to a four-year suspended prison term after she had spent two years under house arrest.

=== Suspension of activities in Russia ===
Ahead of the parliamentary elections in September 2021, the Russian government increased its pressure against opposition voices, where a draft law was being processed that increased the criminal liability of participants of undesirable organisations and enables them to be jailed. Based on this, Open Russia announced on 27 May 2021 that it would stop its operations in Russia in order to protect its members from criminal prosecution and the risk of being imprisoned in the country.

In July 2022, a former head of the organisation, Andrey Pivovarov, was sentenced to four years in prison for "carrying out the activities of an undesirable organization", alleging he was still working with the organization based in London, after he made Facebook posts allegedly criticizing the Federal Security Service and supporting opposition protesters.

== Reactions ==
The forums have attracted the attention of law enforcement who, at times, have cut off internet service for particular speakers.

The Guardian noted that in September 2014 “Russian state media appeared to enforce a blackout on news coverage of Khodorkovky’s project.” According to Khodorkovky's spokeswoman Olga Pispanen, the project's website was targeted by distributed denial of service attacks. Also, some activists were reportedly prevented from joining the ceremony in Nizhny Novgorod and Yaroslavl.

The first forum featured by Open Russia, on September 20, 2014, had over 70,000 viewers.

Political analyst Mark Urnov called Open Russia a “sorely needed” project that represented an “antidote” to the current realities of Russian life.

The New York Times noted that when Khodorkovky made his first U.S. appearance since his release from prison, he was praised for his resolve. The Times continued their praise, noting "notion of prison as cleansing the soul and ennobling the spirit is a powerful motif in Russian literature", citing Dostoyevsky and Solzhenitsyn.

In April 2015, security officers raided Open Russia's Moscow office. In May 2015 the Russian Justice Ministry requested the Prosecutor General to launch a probe into Open Russia's activities. The Justice Ministry has demanded Open Russia label itself a "foreign agent".

In August 2015, however, a Moscow court ordered investigators to return confiscated documents and ordered a retrial.
