= Basmanny justice =

Term used to characterize the judicial system in Russia

- Russian: Басманное правосудие
- Romanization: Basmannoe pravosudie

"Basmanny justice" (Russian: Басманное правосудие) is a term used to characterize the judicial system that emerged in the 2000s in Russia and is distinguished by a low degree of independence of the judiciary in decision-making. The decisions made by the dependent judiciary are considered convenient for the authorities or necessary for them, but run counter to the rule of law.

Sometimes it is used in a semantic meaning as a custom-made court, an instrument of political repression, synonymous with the lack of independence of the court as a whole. The term got its name from the name of the Basmanny District Court of the city of Moscow, known for its high-profile and controversial trials, which caused many-sided criticism of the Russian judicial system, in particular, in the case of Mikhail Khodorkovsky and Yukos shareholders v. Russia. The term and the phenomenon it describes have been the subject of debate among journalists, lawyers and authorities, including former Russian President Dmitry Medvedev and Moscow City Court chief judge Olga Yegorova.

== Origin ==
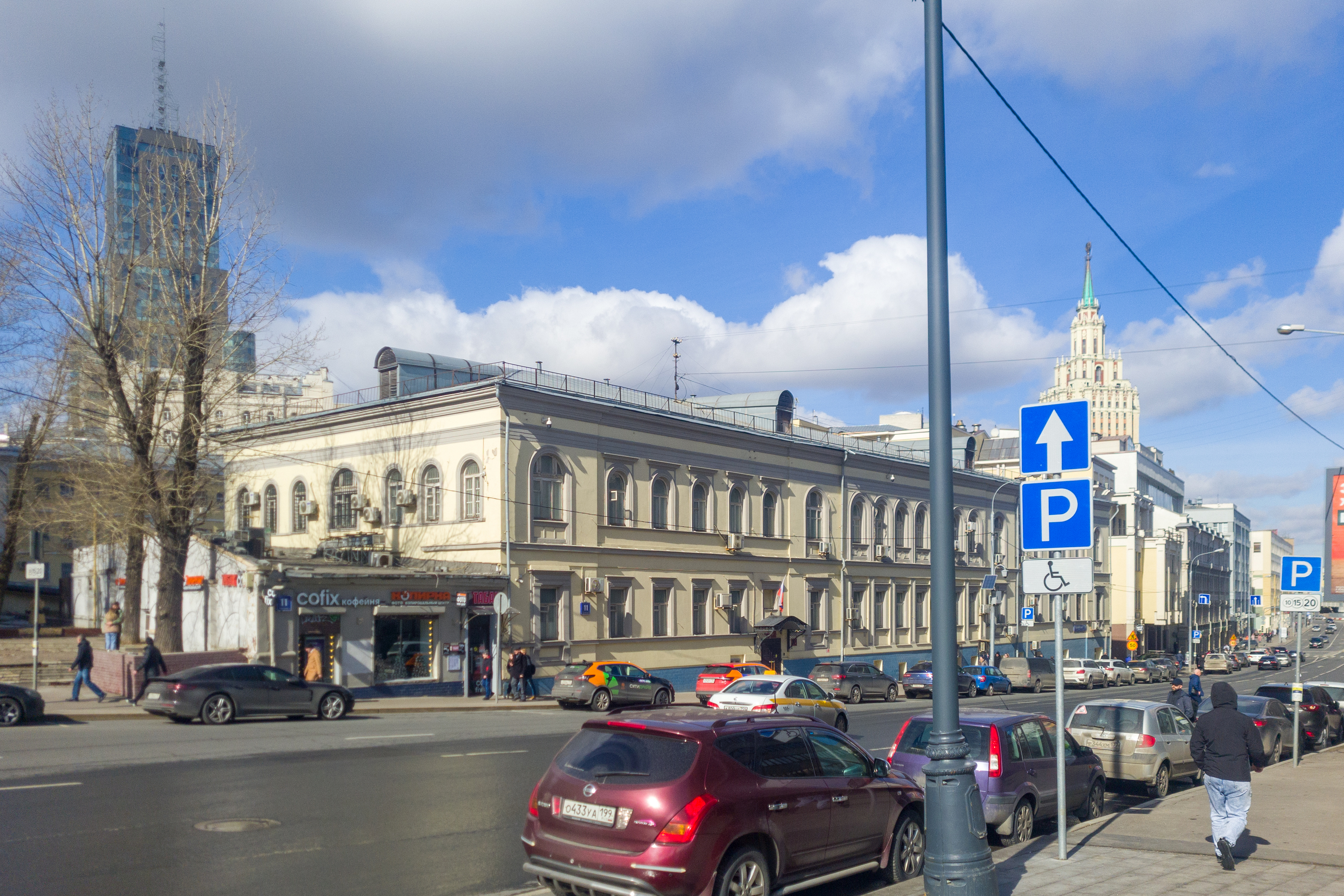
Building of Basmanny courthouse in Moscow

The term was introduced by the editor-in-chief of Echo of Moscow Alexei Venediktov and Gennady Raikov, who called the Basmanny court and its justice Basmanovsky (Russian: Басмановское), which caused Venediktov to associate the term with the oprichniks Aleksei Basmanov and Fyodor Basmanov. In November 2003, the term was used, inter alia, by Grigory Yavlinsky and Boris Nemtsov.

== Opinions ==
In 2004, the President of the High Arbitration Court of Russia Veniamin Yakovlev, expressed the opinion that the presence of a stable label "Basmanny justice" contributes to a critical assessment of the work of Russian judges:

We are such a people – generous with labels. And as soon as the label is glued, it starts to spread. After that, the essence of the matter is no longer important. If you want to say something about justice, remember the label. What kind of justice? Basmanny. After that, the essence of the matter is no longer important. Although we are still trying to understand – why is this? So we are doing something wrong? This helps you to critically evaluate your work.

In 2005, the chief judge of the Moscow City Court, Olga Yegorova, confirmed that "the term really exists," and the book "Basmanny Justice" published by Yukos' lawyer Karinna Moskalenko and her colleagues contains "interesting additional information" that prompted the chief judge of the court to remind the judges subordinate to her demands "clearly comply with the procedural and substantive law, promptly and competently consider each case, since behind each of them are people, their interests, rights, destinies." In 2011, Yegorova argued: "There is no longer either Mosgorshtamp or Basmanny Justice."

In December 2009, this term was commented on by the then Russian President Dmitry Medvedev:

Yes, I've heard this term. I am not sure if it is accurate or correct. But if "basmanny justice" means the adoption of unjust decisions by any court in various places of our country, that is, so-called unjust decisions, as lawyers say, then this is evil, and this must be fought, combated by means of legal response. Such decisions or sentences should be canceled, and if they are taken under the influence of certain circumstances, be it money, political pressure, other factors, the persons who make such sentences and decisions should be held accountable, held accountable before the law, before the country.

== Examples of using the term ==
- 2004 – the trials of Platon Lebedev and Mikhail Khodorkovsky in the Yukos case
- April 2006 – cancellation of the second acquittal in the case of Arakcheev and Khudyakov
- October 2007 – a conflict between the Investigative Committee under the Prosecutor's Office and the Federal Drug Control Service (FDCS)
- November 2007 – the arrest of the head of the operational support department of the FDCS, police lieutenant general Alexander Bulbov
- November 2007 – arrest of the deputy minister of finance of the Russian Federation Storchak
- January 2009 – authorization of the arrest of Evgeny Chichvarkin, founder of the Euroset company
- Spring – summer 2012 — Pussy Riot case, also used — "Khamovnicheskoe justice"
- October 2012 – the arrest of a Russian opposition figure Leonid Razvozzhaev

By analogy with the expression "Basmanny justice", journalists used similar phrases containing the names of other courts to characterize the non-legal nature of their decisions (for example, "Zyuzin justice" (Russian: зюзинское правосудие) during the conflict in Yuzhny Butovo in May 2006).

== See also ==
- Show trial
- Dmitry Shemyaka
- Kangaroo court
- Captured court
- Miscarriage of justice
- Human rights in Russia
- Russian 2022 war censorship laws
