= Ivlev =

Ivlev (Russian: Ивлев) is a Russian masculine surname, its feminine counterpart is Ivleva. It may refer to

- Alexandru Ivlev (born 1981), Moldovan swimmer
- Leonid Ivlev (born 1972), Russian politician
- Pavel Ivlev (born 1970), Russian lawyer
- Sergey Ivlev (born 1983), Russian badminton player
