= Priobskoye field =

Oil field in Khanty-Mansia, Russia

- Location within Russia
- Country: Russia
- Region: Khanty–Mansi Autonomous Okrug, Tyumen Oblast
- Offshore/onshore: onshore
- Coordinates: 61°13′N 70°46′E
- Operator: Samotlorneftegaz
- Partners: Rosneft; Gazprom Neft

Field history
- Discovery: 1982
- Start of production: 2000

Production
- Current production of oil: 500,000 barrels per day (~2.5×10^{7} t/a)
- Year of current production of oil: 2019

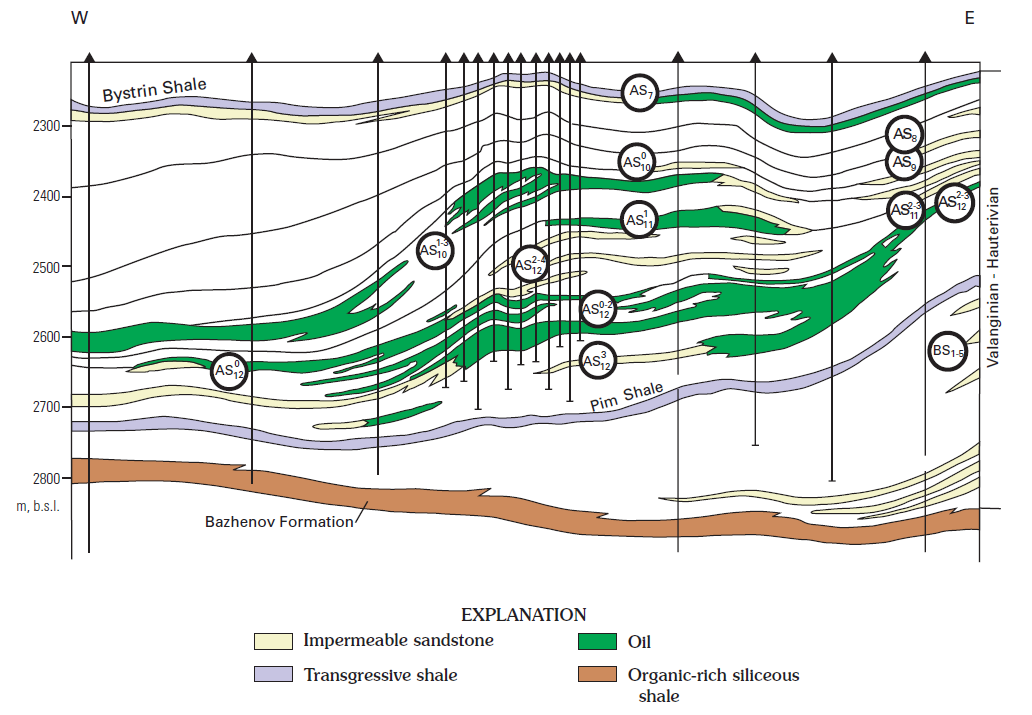
West Siberia Priob field cross section

The Priobskoye field is an oil field in Russia. It occupies an area of 5,466 square kilometres (2,110 sq mi) in the Khanty–Mansi Autonomous Okrug of Western Siberia. It is located along both banks of the Ob River, 65 kilometres (40 mi) east of the District's capital city, Khanty-Mansiysk, and 100 kilometres (62 mi) west of Nefteyugansk, the town that serves the field.

== History ==
The field was discovered in 1982. The northern three-quarters of the field was controlled by YUKOS via its daughter-company Yuganskneftegaz, and began oil production in 2000. In 2004, Yuganskneftegaz was bought by Rosneft, which is now the operating company for that portion of the field. The southern quarter of the field was controlled by Sibir energy, which began a joint venture with Sibneft to develop the field, with volume production beginning in 2003. Sibneft subsequently acquired complete control of the field via a corporate maneuver to dilute Sibir's holding. Sibneft is now majority controlled by Gazprom and renamed Gazprom Neft.

== Production ==
In 2007, the field was producing 675,000 barrels per day (107,300 m^{3}/d): 550,000 barrels per day (87,000 m^{3}/d) in the northern part exploited by Rosneft, and 125,000 barrels per day (19,900 m^{3}/d) in Gazprom Neft area. For 2008, Rosneft reported a growth of production to 680,000 barrels per day (108,000 m^{3}/d), while Gazpromneft's share grew slightly. In 2009, Gazprom Neft produced 160,000 barrels per day (25,000 m^{3}/d) in its share of the field. In September 2019, Russia’s finance ministry approved tax breaks for developing the Priobskoye oilfield, Russia’s largest, to oil giants Rosneft and Gazprom Neft, Alexei Sazanov.

In terms of recent data, the field produces over 20 million tons of hydrocarbons annually, equating roughly to about 400,000 to 450,000 BPD currently. Enhanced recovery techniques such as ultra-long horizontal wells and multi-stage hydraulic fracturing are used to maintain high production despite the field maturing. Production remains consistently high, supported by advanced technology and continuous drilling activity. The field is expected to continue production until around 2057, indicating a managed decline but no immediate sharp drop-off.

== See also ==
- Petroleum industry in Russia
- Tunguska Basin
- West Siberian petroleum basin
