= Pavel Ivlev =

Russian lawyer

- Павел Петрович Ивлев
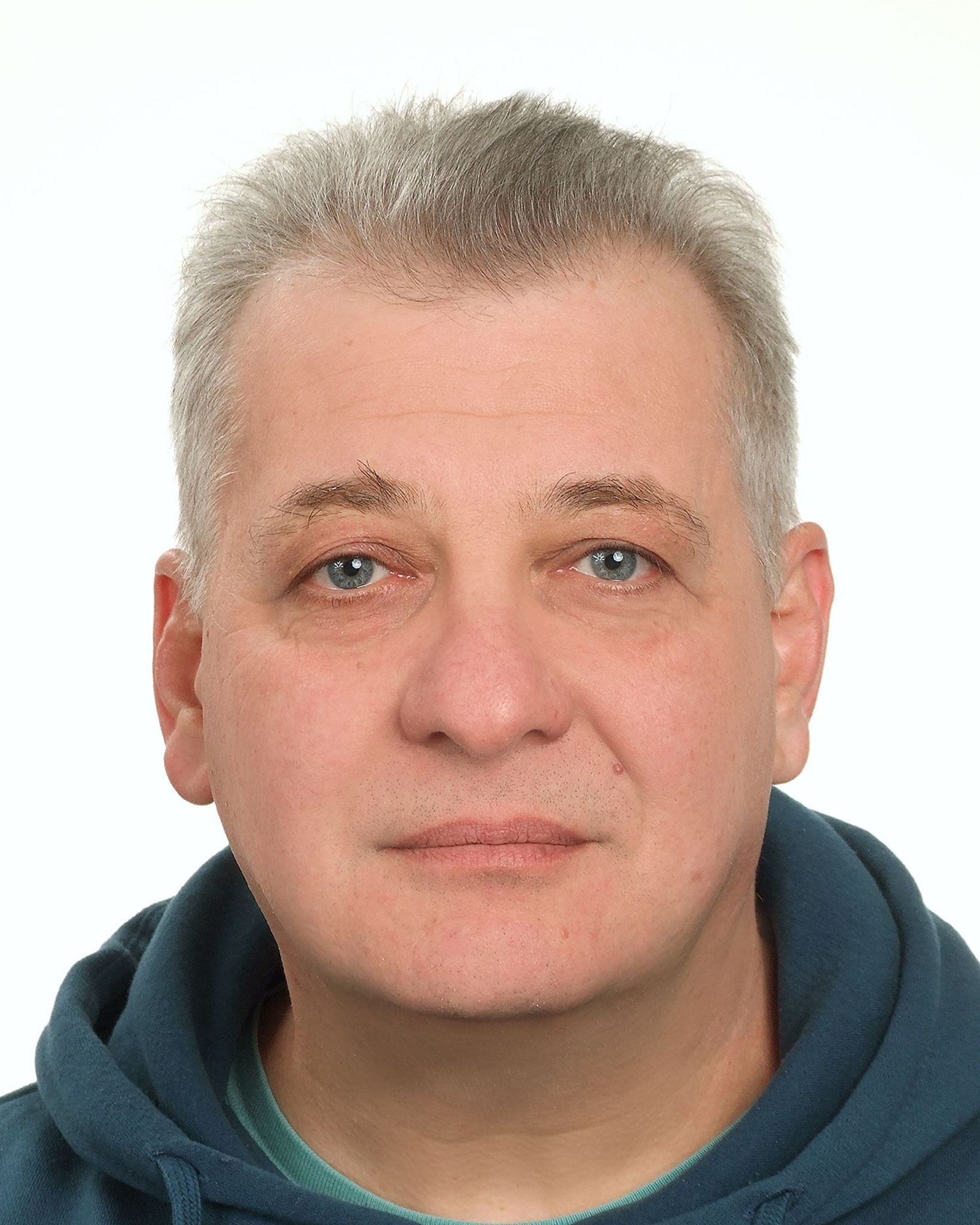
- Pavel Ivlev, 2023
- Born: January 6, 1970 (age 56); Khimki, Moscow Oblast, USSR
- Citizenship: United States
- Education: Moscow State University Faculty of Law
- Occupation: lawyer
- Years active: 1994 — current
- Known for: Yukos affair

Pavel Petrovich Ivlev (born 6 January 1970, Khimki, Moscow Region, Russia) is a Russian lawyer, and now a political refugee in the United States. Ivlev advised Yukos and its former chairman and CEO Mikhail Khodorkovsky and was charged by the Russian authorities as part of the controversial case against Khodorkovsky and other senior Yukos executives, in the course of which violations of human rights and of the rule of law have been reported.

== Education ==
Pavel Ivlev was born in Khimki, Moscow Oblast. He obtained his law degree from Lomonosov Moscow State University in 1993 and continued his education at Columbia University Summer Law School in Amsterdam and at Queen Mary, University of London. During his university years, Ivlev met Vasily Aleksanyan, Svetlana Bakhmina, and others, who later got involved in the Yukos affair, and also was a classmate of the future First Deputy Prime Minister of Russia Igor Shuvalov. In 1993, Ivlev was admitted to the bar, and was shortly invited to Moscow-based ALM Feldmans international law firm where he rose to the deputy managing partner by 1997.

== Career ==
=== Russia ===
Through Ivlev's MSU connections, ALM Feldmans acquired Yukos as its client. The firm provided legal advice to both Yukos and its main shareholders and executives Mikhail Khodorkovsky and Platon Lebedev. Ivlev worked on structuring Yukos business outside Russia and tax optimization. Starting in November 2004, ALM Feldmans became the target of a broader attack against Yukos and its advisers. The company office was searched, and the lawyers were interrogated. On November 16, Ivlev took a flight to the United States. In January 2005, he reunited with his wife and children in the U.S.

Despite being blackmailed by the Russian law enforcement, Ivlev declined to give (false) incriminating evidence against his clients. In December 2005, the Basmanny District Court of Moscow issued an arrest warrant for Ivlev on the charges of embezzlement of the total of 399 billion rubles (approx. 13,7 billion USD at the January 2004 rate) and money laundering. In 2006, Interpol had issued a Red Notice at Russia's request, however, it was later canceled, as Interpol found Ivlev's case predominantly political.

In May 2019, the Khamovniki District Court of Moscow convicted Ivlev guilty of embezzlement of 195 million tons of oil worth over 1 trillion rubles (approx. 34,5 billion USD at the January 2004 rate) and laundering of 133 billion rubles (approx. 4,6 billion USD at the January 2004 rate) and sentenced him in absentia to 10 years in a penal colony

=== United States ===
In the United States, Ivlev was granted citizenship and settled in New Jersey. He continued his legal practice at Kaganer and Partners and opened his own consultancy to advise people who left Russia because of political or economical pressure. In particular, Ivlev cooperates with Interpol and helps his clients cancel requests for detention and extradition that come from the Russian authorities. As Ivlev has pointed out, Russia abused the international law enforcement system to persecute people overseas.

In 2009, Ivlev co-founded the Committee for Russian Economic Freedom which advocates for economic and civil rights in Russia. Since 2016, Ivlev has led KRES Poliskola, an educational project that helps to integrate people from post-soviet states into modern society through the study of history and culture. Ivlev played an important role in the Yukos shareholders v. Russia arbitration proceedings at the Permanent Court of Arbitration. Ivlev assisted the Russian politician Alexei Navalny in the civil investigation of the fraudulent procurement of drilling rigs by the VTB Leasing and also hired Navalny as his attorney in the proceedings related to the Yukos case.

In 2012, media outlets linked Ivlev to the leak of documents related to Igor Shuvalov's investment activities to The Wall Street Journal and The Financial Times. According to the paper provided, since 2000, Shuvalov's family almost certainly used insider information when trading Gazprom stock, yelding dozens of millions of U.S. dollars. The leak of the documents was a huge scandal and sparked an ethical debate within the Russian legal community on the moral responsibility of a professional lawyer. Ivlev never confirmed if he was a source of the leak, but pointed out that even in such a case he won't violate the attorney-client confidentiality, as Shuvalov never was his principal.
