= Storchak =

Storchak (Russian: Сторчак) is a gender-neutral Ukrainian surname. Notable people with the surname include:

- Sergei Storchak (born 1954), Russian politician, current Deputy Finance Minister of Russia
- Vasyl Storchak (born 1965), Ukrainian footballer and coach
