= Invest Union =

Russian company

Invest Union (formerly Gazpromneft) is a Russian company based in St. Petersburg and a former subsidiary of Gazprom. It is not to be confused with Gazprom Neft (formerly Sibneft), which is another company.

On 19 December 2004, Gazpromneft (along with Baikalfinansgrup) participated in a State-run auction for former Yukos subsidiary Yuganskneftegaz. At the time of the auction, the CEO of Gazpromneft was Sergey Bogdanchikov, the then and current President of Rosneft.

Gazpromneft did not place a bid at the auction, allowing Baikalfinansgrup to obtain Yuganskneftegaz at the lowest bid, which was less than half Yuganskneftegaz's market value at the time.

Four days later, on 23 December 2004, Baikalfinansgrup was purchased by Rosneft, causing considerable controversy as to the propriety of the auction.

== See also ==
- Petroleum industry in Russia
