= Baikalfinansgrup =

- Company type: Limited liability company
- Industry: Petroleum
- Founded: December 6, 2004
- Successor: Rosneft Oil Company

Baikalfinansgrup (Russian: Байкалфинансгруп) is a Russian limited liability company owned by Rosneft Oil Company. It is best known as the company that won the December 19, 2004 auction for a 76.79% share in Yuganskneftegaz, formerly the core production subsidiary of Yukos Oil Company. Baikalfinansgrup won the auction with a bid of 261 billion rubles (US$9.3 bn), which was somewhere between 37% and 49% of Yuganskneftegaz’ market value at the time, according to an appraisal made by Dresdner Kleinwort Wasserstein and JPMorgan Chase & Co.

== Profile ==
Baikalfinansgrup was created on December 6, 2004, just two weeks before the Yuganskneftegaz auction, with a share capital of 10,000 rubles (US$358). Its original registered address was in the north-western Russian city of Tver in a building that houses a vodka bar, a mobile-phone shop, a tour operator agency and the offices of several small local companies, but no office of Baikalfinansgrup. Baikalfinansgrup later moved its legal address to the head office of Rosneft Oil Company, which is situated on Sofiyskaya Embankment directly opposite the Kremlin.

Despite its obscurity, Baikalfinansgrup was able to secure a credit of US$1.7 bn from the state-owned Sberbank savings bank as a down-payment for participating in the auction.

On December 21, 2004, Russian president Vladimir Putin admitted that he knew the owners of Baikalfinansgrup. Putin did not disclose their names, but noted that they were individuals with "many years of experience in the energy business".

== Yuganskneftegaz auction ==
Yuganskneftegaz was the core production subsidiary of Yukos Oil Company, which was previously run by Russian businessman Mikhail Khodorkovsky. In 2003, the Russian tax authorities charged Yukos and Khodorkovsky with large-scale tax evasion. On April 14, 2004, Yukos was presented with a bill for over US $35 bn in back taxes and a demand to pay the entire bill the same day. Requests by Yukos to defer payment, allow payment by instalments or to discharge the debt by sale of peripheral assets, including its shareholding in the Sibneft oil company, were also refused. Since Yukos was both legally and physically unable to pay the entire amount in cash on such short notice, Russian bailiffs froze Yukos’ shares in Yuganskneftegaz.

On November 19, 2004, Russian bailiffs placed a notice in the Russian government newspaper Rossiyskaya gazeta announcing that Yuganskneftegaz would be sold at an auctioned scheduled to be held 30 days later on December 19, 2004. The conditions for participation in the auction included an advance deposit of US $1.7 bn and prior clearance by the Russian Federal Antimonopoly Service.

In early December, the Russian state-controlled gas monopoly Gazprom submitted an application to participate in the auction through its wholly owned subsidiary, Gazpromneft. Gazpromneft had been created in September 2004 in preparation for a planned merger between Gazprom and state-owned Rosneft.

On December 15, 2004, Yukos filed for a bankruptcy protection in a Houston court, and obtained a temporary injunction prohibiting Gazprom from participating in the auction. On the next day, December 16, a group of Western banks withdrew their financial support for the Gazprom application. On the same day, the previously unknown Baikalfinansgrup applied to participate in the auction.

On December 19, 2004, only two companies appeared for the auction: Gazpromneft and Baikalfinansgrup. Gazpromneft declined to place any offer, thus allowing Baikalfinansgrup to acquire Yuganskneftegaz on its first bid.

Four days later Baikalfinansgrup was acquired by Rosneft. Rosneft later disclosed in its annual financial statement that it had financed the acquisition of Yuganskneftegaz. At the time, Rosneft president Sergey Bogdanchikov was also the CEO of Gazpromneft.

Shortly after the auction, the planned merger between Gazprom and Rosneft merger was called off, and Sergey Bogdanchikov resigned his post as CEO of Gazpromneft.

On February 7, 2006, in response to a question by a Spanish journalist, Russian President Vladimir Putin disclosed that Rosneft had used Baikalfinansgrup as a vehicle to acquire Yuganskneftegaz in order to protect itself against litigation risks.

== See also ==
- Petroleum industry in Russia
