= Tomskneft =

Russian oil company

- Company type: Privately held company
- Industry: Petroleum
- Founded: 1966; 60 years ago in Tomsk, Russia
- Headquarters: Strezhevoy, Russia
- Area served: Siberia
- Key people: Roman Zharavin (General director)
- Products: Crude oil, natural gas
- Revenue: (▼121,9 billion rubles (Fiscal Year Ended December 31, 2016))
- Parent: Independent Oil Company (50%), Gazpromneft (50%)

JSC Tomskneft VNK — is a Russian oil and gas company, headquartered in Strezhevoy, Russia. Founded in 1966, Tomskneft is one of the largest companies of the Tomsk region and Siberia. As of 2022, the Independent Oil Company and Gazpromneft own 50% of the company respectively.

== History ==
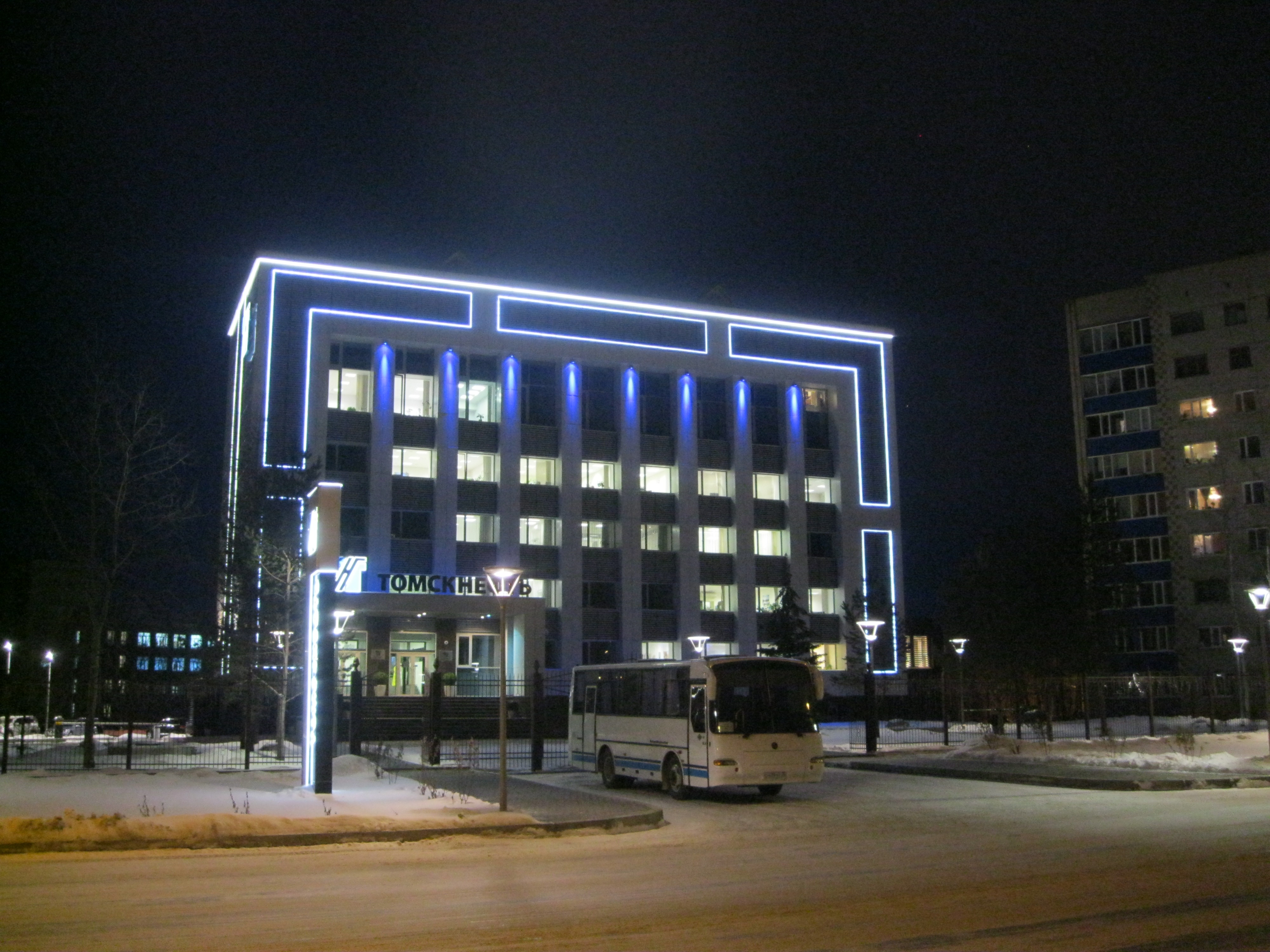
The Tomskneft headquarters in Strezhevoy, Tomsk region

Tomskneft is the successor company to a Soviet plant that was founded in January 1966 by the decree of the Tyumen oil and gas industrial enterprise. The plant extracted the first million tons of oil in 1969. By 1974, it produced 25 million tons of oil. In 1977, the Ministry of Oil Industry separated Tomskneft from the Tyumen oil and gas industrial enterprise, thus forming the Tomskneft industrial association.

Following the dissolution of the Soviet Union, Tomskneft was privatized in 1993. The next year, together with the Achinsk oil refinery, the Tomskneftekhim factory, and several smaller Siberian oil companies it formed the basis upon which the newly founded Eastern Oil Company (EOC) was organized.

In 1997, Yukos, one of the largest Russian oil producers at the time, acquired the majority interest of the EOC, thus taking over Tomskneft and the EOC's other subsidiaries. Tomskneft was a part of Yukos until 2007, when its shares were sold to Rosneft and Gazpromneft due to the parent company's bankruptcy. Each company acquired 50% of Tomskneft's stocks.

In August 2021, Rosneft sold its block of Tomskneft's shares to the Independent Oil Company.

== Activity ==
Tomskneft operates in the oil and gas industry, mainly focusing on exploration and extraction of the sources. As of 2020, the company owned 32 oil and gas fields, extracting annually up to 5,2 million of tons of oil. In 2022, the company's revenue amounted to 183 billion rubles.

== Controversies ==
In December 1998, Asirota Limited, a Cypriot company, holding 13% of Tomskneft's shares, accused Yukos of violating the rights of minority shareholders by lowering Tomskneft's oil prices. This case was later used in a trial against Mikhail Khodorkovsky, Yukos's former owner. He was allegedly accused of stealing 350 million tons of oil from Tomskneft and other Yukos's subsidiaries. Russian economist Sergey Guriyev later regarded the trial and subsequent incarceration of Khodorkovsky as a political repression.

In 2015, Tomskneft was fined for illegal use of an oil exploration and extraction sites in the Kargasoksky District. Upon paying the fine, the company was granted permission to exploit the industrial sites.

In 2019, Tomskneft and the PetroAlians Oil Company signed an agreement to extract petroleum at the Lomovoye oil field in the Tomsk region. In May 2020, due to an accident, Tomskneft's workers left PetroAlians's equipment in the oil well. In April 2022, the court ruled that Tomskneft had to pay 30,7 million rubles to its partner for the lost equipment. Although Tomskneft appealed the suit in June 2022, the court of appeal confirmed that the company should pay the established sum to PetroAlians. In December the same year, the arbitration court of the Tomsk oblast has ruled that the "Samotlorneftepromkhim" (SNPK) drilling company should pay 30,7 million rubles to Tomskneft to reimburse the loss of PetroAlians's equipment at Lomovoye oil field.

== See also ==
- Petroleum industry in Russia

== Literature ==
- Осуществление ленинских идей превращения Сибири в экономически развитый район страны [The fulfillment of the Leninist ideas in the economic development of Siberia] (in Russian). Kemerovo. 1972.
- Pomorov, A. A. (1988). Нефть и газ Томской области: сборник документов и материалов [Oil and gas of the Tomsk region: Documents and sources] (in Russian). Tomsk: Tomsk book publisher.
- Энциклопедия Томской области [The Encyclopedia of the Tomsk region] (in Russian). Tomsk: Tomsk State University. 2008–2009. ISBN 978-5-7511-1917-1.
