= Yukos shareholders v. Russia =

International court cases

Yukos shareholders v. Russia are several international court and arbitral cases seeking compensation from the government of Russia. The former shareholders of Yukos claim that Russian courts were not acting in good faith in launching tax evasion criminal proceedings against Yukos, which led to the bankruptcy of the company.

The Yukos Oil Company's former shareholders and management filed a series of claims in courts and before arbitration panels in various countries, seeking compensation for their expropriation. The largest, for over $100 billion, was filed at the international Permanent Court of Arbitration in The Hague in 2007 and resulted in the arbitrators awarding Yukos majority shareholders over US$50 billion in damages. This decision was appealed by Russia and overturned by the Hague's district court, before being upheld by the Court of Appeal of the Hague. On 5 November 2021 the Dutch supreme court struck down the order for Russia to pay $50 billion to former shareholders and referred the case back to the Amsterdam Court of Appeal.

Observers note the bad timing of the final rulings on the majority shareholders' claim for Russia amid the Russo-Ukrainian war. Russia intends to fight these decisions of the international courts.

US and Russian investors, representing about 15 percent and 5 percent of Yukos, respectively, lack the benefit of an investment treaty. The sole remedy of US-based investors in seeking approximately $12 billion in redress is to request the State Department and the Office of the United States Trade Representative to espouse the claim to their Russian counterparts, as it is determined by the Magnitsky Act of 2012; State Department officials have reportedly raised Yukos investors' concerns at deputy prime minister level in the past.

== Court proceedings of Yukos management ==
=== Claim in Houston court ===
In 2005, Yukos unsuccessfully asked a US court in Houston to send its multibillion-dollar tax dispute with the Russian authorities to an international arbitration forum. By bringing the case in a US court, Yukos sought to focus international attention on its travails and increase pressure on Russian authorities.

=== Claim in the European Court of Human Rights (ECtHR) ===
==== Application and admission ====
On April 23, 2004, shortly after the imposition of the tax assessment for the year 2000, the former management of Yukos (OAO Neftyanaya kompaniya YUKOS) submitted an application to the European Court of Human Rights.

Yukos’ claim in the ECHR argued that the company's rights, protected by the European Convention on Human Rights, were violated in Russian courts, which led to its bankruptcy and liquidation; it also argued that Yukos has been singled out for discriminatory treatment. Yukos officials complained that their rights were breached under several articles of the Convention, specifically:

“Under Article 6 (right to a fair trial) of the Convention, the applicant company complains about various defects in the proceedings concerning its tax liability for the year 2000. Under Article 1 of Protocol No. 1 (protection of property), taken alone and in conjunction with Articles 1 (obligation to respect human rights), 13 (right to an effective remedy), 14 (prohibition of discrimination) and 18 (limitation on use of restrictions on rights) of the Convention, it complains about the lawfulness and proportionality of the 2000–2003 Tax Assessments and their subsequent enforcement, including the forced sale of OAO Yuganskneftegaz. Lastly, the applicant company complains, under Article 7 (no punishment without law) of the Convention, about the lack of proper legal basis, selective and arbitrary prosecution and the imposition of double penalties in the Tax Assessment proceedings for the years 2000–2003.”

Following an admissibility assessment that took five years, the court declared the Yukos application admissible on 29 January 2009. The Court declares admissible only less than 5% of all submitted applications.

==== Proceedings ====
The hearing on merits of the Yukos Oil Company v Russia case in the European Court of Human Rights took place on 4 March 2010. Yukos Oil Company was represented by Piers Gardner, Barrister of Monckton Chambers. The Russian side was represented by a team of lawyers, which included Georgy Matyushkin, Representative of the Russian Federation at the European Court of Human Rights, and British lawyer Michael Swainston. The claim before the ECHR amounted to US$98 billion – as majority shareholders did in the arbitration case before the Permanent Court of Arbitration in The Hague – but later reduced the claim. This was the largest claim to be brought in the court's history. The claim was an estimate of what the value of Yukos would have been if its assets had not been stripped away and the company had not been liquidated in 2007. The decision was announced on September 20, 2011.

The court announced that the Russian state violated the human rights of Yukos by agreeing there had been a violation of Yukos' right to fairness in legal proceedings in relation to a tax re-assessment for 2000. The court also established that there had been a violation of the right to protection of property through enforcement proceedings carried out over tax assessments from 2000 to 2003. The interpretation of the tax liabilities which were applied to Yukos was foreseeable, but the court still noted that the crux of the case was the rapid and inflexible enforcement of those liabilities. Yukos had been effectively paralysed because all of its assets were frozen from the first assessment. The court held that two factors in particular contributed to Yukos' demise and violated Article 1 of Protocol No. 1:

''1. The bailiff's choice of Yukos' principal subsidiary as the first target for auction, without considering the implications for the company's future: this dealt Yukos a 'fatal blow';

2. The Russian authorities were unyielding and inflexible in response to requests for time to pay and the bailiffs imposed additional fines amounting to €1.15 Bn, which had to be paid before the taxes, but the payment of which was prohibited under the freezing orders." The court did however note that the tax assessments themselves were not considered disproportionate. It was agreed that there was not enough evidence to suggest that Yukos had been treated differently from other companies and so no violation of Article 14 was found. The court denied an allegation that Russia misused legal procedures to dismantle Yukos despite the court's nine-judge panel finding that Russia violated three articles of the European Convention on Human Rights. Both sides claimed victory over the ruling.

No monetary amount was awarded after the European Court of Human Rights (ECHR) found the question of damages as "not ready for decision". Both parties subsequently had three months to reach a settlement. The ECHR ruling became final on March 8, 2012 when the ECHR Grand Chamber did not accept the request of the Yukos Oil company to have its application to the court referred to the Grand Chamber.

The ECHR invited a claim for 'just satisfaction', or compensation, from Yukos, which sought compensation of just under 38 billion euros. These damages were being sought on behalf of all Yukos shareholders. There are around 55,000 named Yukos shareholders, some of which are funds representing a number of shareholders. On July 31, 2014, the ECHR awarded shareholders and their heirs €1.87 billion ($2.6 billion), finding Russia failed to strike a "fair balance" in its treatment of Yukos Oil Company. The ECHR also ruled Russia should pay 300,000 euros in costs and expenses, plus any tax. The award fell well short of the €37.98 billion in damages Yukos had asked for. It was also significantly less than the $50 billion in damages that its former majority owners were awarded by a tribunal at the Permanent Court of Arbitration earlier that same week. However, it was the largest compensation award made by the court. It was 21 times larger than any previous award by this court.

==== Appeal ====
Russia appealed against the ECHR ruling. In December 2014, however, the court rejected an appeal and decided Russia had six months to work out, together with the Council of Europe, the continent's main human rights and democracy forum, a plan "for distribution of the award of just satisfaction".

==== Enforcement ====
On June 15, 2015, Russia missed the deadline to submit to the Council of Europe a compensation plan for the distribution of the just satisfaction awarded to Yukos shareholders after the Committee of Ministers of the Council of Europe issued a final reminder only a few days earlier. That same day, more than 90 deputies of the Russian State Duma sent a request to the country's Constitutional Court to clarify how ECHR writs of executions should be applied in Russia. On July 14, 2015, the court ruled that ECHR judgments did "not override the pre-eminence of the constitution in the Russian legal system" and that Russia "can step back from its obligations" if that is the only way to avoid violating its constitution; however, the judges also said that they had not yet reviewed the ECHR decision on Yukos since the case had not been filed to the Constitutional Court.

In 2017, the Constitutional Court of Russia overturned a demand by the European Court of Human Rights for the Russian government to pay €1.9 billion to shareholders of Yukos. In response, the Council of Europe condemned Russia's refusal to abide by the Court's ruling, arguing that the country's non-compliance "bears far-reaching consequences for human rights protection in Russia and elsewhere in Europe".

== Arbitration proceedings by Yukos Capital ==
Yukos Capital S.a.r.l., a Luxembourg-based company under two Dutch-registered protective foundations – Stichting Administratiekantoor Yukos International and FPH for Stichting Administratiekantoor FPH – that are run by Yukos’s former management, represents all those who held Yukos shares when the company was liquidated in 2007, including about 55,000 minority shareholders, some of which were investment funds. As of 2015, the structures control up to $2 billion in assets, which had been claimed by Rosneft.

In 2006, Yukos Capital obtained four ICC arbitration awards against Rosneft by a Russian tribunal in Moscow, totalling $245 million; mores specifically, the awards were against Rosneft's predecessor company, Yuganskneftegaz, representing money owed to Yukos Capital under four loan agreements. The ruling was later overturned by the High Court of Arbitration of Russia in 2007, but it gave Yukos Capital a chance to take its case to a Dutch court which also ordered Rosneft to pay up.

In a decision dated April 28, 2009, the Court of Appeal in Amsterdam declared the awards enforceable. Subsequently, the Supreme Court of the Netherlands issued a final ruling in 2010 ordering Rosneft to pay $389.3 million in claims. As a result of the Dutch court decision, in 2010 Rosneft paid Yukos the value of the awards. However, it did not pay the $160 million post-award interest that had accrued since 2006. When Rosneft refused to make the requested payments, Yukos Capital asked the courts in Britain, Ireland and the state of New York to oblige it. That same year, a UK court froze £425 million ($640 million) held in UK bank accounts by Rosneft to enforce the claim. This was the first time that Rosneft was materially affected by its acquisition of Yukos's assets.

In June 2011, the English Commercial Court decided both issues in favour of Yukos, and Rosneft appealed to the Court of Appeal of England and Wales. In 2012, the Court of Appeal rejected Yukos Capital's argument that the Dutch treatment of the Russian judgments binds the English courts in any respect, leaving Rosneft free to defend based on the Russian annulment decisions. In a separate part of the English judgment, the court held that the English Act of state doctrine does not impact certain arguments Yukos Capital seeks to make concerning the Russian annulment decisions. Yukos Capital had claimed interest on arbitration awards that were annulled by the Russian courts but the Amsterdam Court of Appeal nevertheless enforced.

In 2013, Yukos Capital asked the United States District Court for the Southern District of New York to confirm a $421 million arbitration award against Rosneft. In 2014, a New York court ordered Samaraneftegaz, a former Yukos subsidiary now owned by Rosneft, to turn over assets to the US to satisfy a judgment to pay Yukos Capital $186 million and restrained it from transferring assets to either shareholders or affiliates. Samaraneftegaz has been refusing to pay the damages ever since 2007. At the Court of Appeal of Paris in January 2013, Rosneft oil extraction subsidiary OAO Tomskneft successfully challenged enforcement in France of the international arbitral award obtained by Yukos Capital S.a.r.l. in 2007 in New York.

In April 2015, Yukos Capital and Rosneft settled all outstanding litigation in the Netherlands, England, Russia, the U.S. and other jurisdictions; the settlement involved no monetary or other payments by Rosneft or its subsidiaries. Meanwhile, the amount of money reportedly secured in the agreement exceeded 400 million British pounds ($593 million). According to the agreement, the sides are also obliged not to make any future claims related to the bankruptcy and liquidation of Yukos. Those claims that Yukos Capital had already won in court were unaffected by the agreement.

== Arbitration proceedings by shareholders ==
=== Arbitration proceedings by majority shareholders ===
In 2005, GML Ltd. (formerly Group Menatep), the former owner of 60 percent of Yukos, filed a lawsuit under the Energy Charter Treaty before a tribunal at the Permanent Court of Arbitration in The Hague.

The Permanent Court of Arbitration handled the following cases:

- Hulley Enterprises Limited (Cyprus) v. The Russian Federation
- Yukos Universal Limited (Isle of Man) v. The Russian Federation
- Veteran Petroleum Limited (Cyprus) v. The Russian Federation

The Energy Charter Treaty aims to promote international investment and co-operation in the energy industry, and to stimulate foreign direct investment and global trade, in part by reassuring potential international investors that their investment will receive fair treatment. GML drew on two main provisions for its case -

- The treaty does not prevent governments from seizing or nationalizing commercial assets. However it requires that the investors must be fairly compensated if their assets are unfairly seized.
- Investors may seek arbitration for such claims against signatory governments, and rulings are legally binding and enforceable for both parties (subject to any appeal).

Although Russia did not ultimately ratify the full treaty, these clauses were still agreed as legally binding for a number of years, as part of the draft framework. European investments in Russian energy projects that took place before Russia agreed to leave the treaty still fall under the treaty's provision of protecting investments. As a consequence, the three-person tribunal led by Canadian lawyer Yves Fortier ruled in 2009 that it would hear the case and that the Veteran Petroleum Trust, a corporate pension fund covering 30,000 ex-Yukos employees, as well as two companies that own Yukos shares — all represented by GML – could seek payments from the Russian government.

Previously the main shareholder in Yukos, GML sued Russia for more than $100 billion; the core shareholders' stake was worth an estimated $25 billion at the time Yukos was dismantled, but the litigants asked for a multiple of that amount to reflect Yukos' estimated post-expropriation capitalisation and interest. This made the case the world's largest-ever arbitration case. Russia played a full part in the arbitration, appointing heavyweight law firm Cleary Gottlieb Steen & Hamilton to represent it.

On July 28, 2014, the Permanent Court of Arbitration rendered the decision of the three arbitrators serving in the case – besides Fortier, Judge Stephen Schwebel of the United States (appointed by Russia) and Charles Poncet of Switzerland (appointed by the claimants) – in a roughly 600-page ruling. They ruled for the majority shareholders, awarding them $50 billion against Russia, around half of their claim yet 20 times the previous record for an arbitration ruling. The Russian Federation was also ordered to reimburse the Yukos stakeholders for 75% of their legal fees, $60 million.

The court found unanimously that an expropriation had taken place, with that Russia having expropriated the Yukos oil company in a series of politically motivated attacks in breach of Article 13(1) of the Energy Charter Treaty. In particular, the panel said Russia “was not driven by motives of tax collection” in auctioning off a core business but “by the desire of the state to acquire Yukos' most valuable asset.” However, the arbitrators docked 25 per cent from the value they attributed to the assets seized.

The main beneficiaries of just over $40 billion are Leonid Nevzlin, owner of just over 70 percent of GML, as well as four other ex-Yukos owners – Platon Lebedev, Mikhail Brudno, Vladimir Dubov and Vasily Shakhnovsky – who each have just under 7.5 percent. The shareholders do not include Khodorkovsky, who had signed over his Yukos majority stake to Nevzlin during his trial in 2005, in an effort to fend off the attack on the company, and has renounced any claim. Other key beneficiaries include the Veteran Petroleum, a pension fund for about 30,000 former Yukos employees set up in 2001, which is due to receive another $8.2 billion from Russia.

According to the decision, Russia has until January 2015 to pay or face interest on what it owes. The possibility for setting the award aside by courts in the Netherlands is limited to technical issues. If Russia refuses to pay, the claimants may – unlike in previous Yukos-related litigation – pursue Russian sovereign commercial assets by winning court-ordered seizures in the 150 countries that are party to the 1958 New York Convention on enforcing arbitration awards; Russia is a signatory of the convention.

Russia has petitioned the court to set the arbitration award aside on technical grounds and missed a deadline to pay the full sum in January 2015. Its application to set the arbitration award aside is expected to be heard in November 2015.

When Russia refused to pay the damages, the shareholders were instead forced to register the award in other state parties to the New York Convention and seek court orders to freeze, and ultimately seize, Russian state assets in compensation:

- In a comment on the ruling, the Federal Foreign Office of Germany stated on 28 July 2014 that "the ruling is valid, and the Federal Government will abide by it." In summer 2015, GML submitted the arbitration award for recognition to the German courts.

- In France, law enforcement officials seized Russian state accounts in about 40 banks, along with eight or nine buildings. Some of these assets were later unfrozen, because the courts determined that they were protected by state immunity. In November 2016, however, the Paris Tribunal de Grande Instance decided not to release 12 non-diplomatic Russian assets and thereby rejected Russia’s claim that the enforcement proceedings should be affected by the decision of the District Court of The Hague to set aside the award.

- On June 17, 2015, Belgian court bailiffs notified 47 Belgian and Russian companies and nongovernmental organizations registered in the region of Brussels that the government was freezing any Russian state assets in their possession – mostly bank accounts and real estate –, as well as any debts they may owe to the Russian government, amounting to assets reportedly worth around 1.65 billion euros ($1.9 billion). In response, the Foreign Ministry of Russia summoned Belgium’s ambassador to Moscow, Alex Van Meeuwen, over the freezes and warned that Russia would consider taking similar action against Belgian accounts and property in the country. By 2016, GML accused the Belgian government of caving in to “bullying” by Russia after it attempted to block court moves to seize non-diplomatic Russian state assets.

- In summer 2015, GML brought a lawsuit in the District of Columbia to enforce the arbitration ruling. The United States subsequently gave Russia until August 21, 60 days after it was written, to reply or object.

The Russian foreign minister, Sergei Lavrov, said in televised comments that Russian entities affected by the moves were preparing to go to court to force the freezing of the assets of “foreign companies with government involvement” in Russia.

On 20 April 2016 the District Court of The Hague quashed the decisions of the PCA, ruling that it had no jurisdiction as provisional application of the ECT arbitration clause violated Russian law. The District Court's decision was overturned in February 2020 by The Hague Court of Appeal, reinstating the enforcement of the arbitration ruling against the Russian government. Russia's Justice Ministry stated it plans to appeal this.

=== Arbitration proceedings by minority shareholders ===
Two arbitration tribunals in Stockholm in 2010 and 2012 ruled in favor of Yukos investors from the United Kingdom and Spain who demanded compensation under bilateral investment protection treaties. However these decisions were overturned by the Swedish appeal court in 2016.

==== RosInvestCo UK Ltd. ====
In early 2006, RosInvestCo UK Ltd., a former minority shareholder of Yukos Oil Company and affiliate of Elliott Associates, initiated a suit against Russia on the basis of a bilateral investment treaty between the United Kingdom and the Russian Federation. RosInvest had purchased its shares at a time when their value had already diminished significantly because of Russia's actions against Yukos, including auctioning off of Yukos' common shares in its principal production facilities. In May 2006, the tribunal was constituted at the Arbitration Institute of the Stockholm Chamber of Commerce and included Karl-Heinz Böckstiegel, Sir Franklin Berman KCMG QC and the Rt Hon Lord Steyn. In 2010, the tribunal decided that the Russian state's measures constituted an unlawful expropriation because their effect was intended to “destroy Yukos and gain control over its assets”, thus marking the first instance where an international court or tribunal ruled on the merits of an expropriation claim filed against Russia by former Yukos investors. The court ruled for the Yukos shareholders and for the recovery of $3.5 million in damages from Russia.

==== Quasar de Valores SICAV SA ====
In March 2007, Spanish minority investors in Yukos Oil Company filed an arbitration proceeding, Quasar de Valores SICAV S.A., et al. v. The Russian Federation, had been filed in March 2007 under the Spain-Russia investment treaty. The tribunal under the auspices of the Arbitration Institute of the Stockholm Chamber of Commerce consisted of Jan Paulsson (chair) of Freshfields Bruckhaus Deringer; Toby Landau QC, of Essex Court Chambers; and Judge Charles N. Brower of the Iran-United States Claims Tribunal.

In 2012, the claimants won an arbitration award from Russia. Issuing a unanimous award, the tribunal ruled that Russia used “illegitimate” tax bills to bankrupt and nationalize Yukos. The tribunal awarded the Spanish shareholders $2 million plus interest since November 2007, when the company was liquidated. This put the value of Yukos at the time at $62.1 billion, which would be $83 billion with interest added.

==== Russian appeal ====
Russia sought a declaratory judgment action asking to declare that the Stockholm Chamber of Commerce tribunal lacked jurisdiction. The challenge was escalated to the Supreme Court of Sweden, which decided in 2012 that it could proceed. In 2014, the Stockholm District Court eventually dismissed Russia’s challenge and also concluded that despite Russia’s objections, the Spanish funds should be awarded costs.

On 28 January 2016, the Swedish appeal court upheld the Russian appeal, ruling that indeed the Arbitration Institute of the Stockholm Chamber of Commerce did not have the jurisdiction to arbitrate the case.
