= Leonid Ivlev =

Russian politician (born 1972)

- Леонид Ивлев

Deputy of the 8th State Duma
- Incumbent
- Assumed office 19 September 2021

Personal details
- Born: 1 May 1953 (age 73) Zavershye, Ostrogozhsky District, Voronezh Oblast, Russian Soviet Federative Socialist Republic, USSR
- Party: United Russia
- Education: Kurgan Higher Military-Political Aviation School

Leonid Ivlev (Russian: Леонид Григорьевич Ивлев; born July 22, 1972, Mirny, Arkhangelsk Oblast) is a Russian political figure, major general, and deputy of the 8th State Duma.

From 1975 to 1984, he occupied leading positions in the Soviet Air Forces. Later he continued his career as a teacher at the Zhukovsky Air Force Engineering Academy where he worked from 1984 to 1996. In 1996–2007, he worked at the Presidential Administration of Russia and occupied the position of a Deputy Chief of the Presidential Domestic Policy Directorate. From 2007 to 2016, he was a member of the Central Election Commission and was responsible for the interaction with political parties and public associations, control over the observance of electoral rights and the right to participate in a referendum of citizens in the preparation and conduct of elections to the authorities of the constituent entities of the Russian Federation. Since September 2021, he has served as deputy of the 8th State Duma.

== Sanctions ==
He was sanctioned by the UK government in 2022 in relation to the Russo-Ukrainian War.

On 24 March 2022, the United States Treasury sanctioned him in response to the 2022 Russian invasion of Ukraine.

== Awards ==
- Order "For Merit to the Fatherland"
- Order of Honour
- Medal of the Order "For Merit to the Fatherland"
- Medal "Veteran of the Armed Forces of the USSR"
- Medal "For Impeccable Service"
- Medal "For the Return of Crimea"
- Russian Federation Presidential Certificate of Honour
