= Svetlana Bakhmina =

Russian legal executive (born 1969)

Svetlana Petrovna Bakhmina (Russian: Светла́на Петро́вна Бахмина́, born 13 October 1969 in Moscow) was a middle-ranking legal executive for Yukos, the Russian oil company who was arrested and tried on charges of tax evasion and embezzlement. On April 21, 2009 she was released from jail.

== Arrest and trial ==
Svetlana Bakhima was arrested on 8 December 2004 and tried on charges of tax evasion and embezzlement. On 19 April 2006 she was sentenced to two years imprisonment for tax evasion and six and a half years imprisonment for embezzlement, which the Simonovsky district court combined into a seven-year prison term in a high-security penal colony.

== Failed appeal ==
Svetlana Bakhmina, then 36, was the mother of two little boys, 2 and 6 years of age. She was not permitted to see her children even once in the sixteen months from the time of her arrest to the passing down of the sentence of imprisonment. In 2005 she went on hunger strike after her custodians in the pre-trial detention centre refused to allow her to make paid telephone calls to her sons.

Following an appeal, the conviction for tax evasion was overturned in the Moscow City Court on 24 August 2006, and her sentence was accordingly reduced to six and a half years. At the same hearing, Svetlana Bakhmina was given leave to appeal for a postponement of the prison term because she had small children. Consequently, on 19 September 2006 Svetlana Bakhmina appealed to the court for a deferral of her sentence for nine years (under Russian law, a person whose sentence is deferred in such a way can be allowed temporary liberty). The decision of the court was to refuse her appeal.

On 27 May 2008 Bakhmina appealed to the Zubovo-Polyansky court of Mordovia for an early conditional discharge. The appeal was refused.

On 10 September 2008 Bakhmina once again appealed to the Zubovo-Polyansky court of Mordovia for an early conditional discharge, as she had served half of her term. The appeal was refused despite the fact that Bakhmina was in her seventh month of pregnancy.

=== Release ===
On November 28, 2008 Bakhmina gave birth to a girl. There was no response to Bakhmina's appeal for clemency. On April 21, 2009 she was released from jail.

== Reactions ==
Commentators claimed that Svetlana Bakhmina was not guilty of any offence, but she was in effect a political prisoner due to political vendetta by the authorities against Yukos and its executive officers. The allegation claimed that the prosecuting authorities were not able to lay hands on the Yukos legal executive general counsel Dmitry Gololobov, and thus chose to prosecute Svetlana Bakhmina because she was the only legal officer they could find. The lawyer for the imprisoned Yukos chief executive Mikhail Khodorkovsky, Robert Amsterdam, a Canadian claimed after being expelled from Russia, and prior to the verdict on Ms. Bakhmina, that "the prosecution has admitted that she was a hostage of the Kremlin. They want the former general counsel back and they are using her as a pawn to get him back."

It was claimed that the "victim" company – the Tomskneft oil company – has not filed any complaint and says, on the contrary, that it has suffered no such fraud.

An article A Vicious Sentence by Mikhail Fishman, in Kommersant-Vlast in 2006 claimed:

"This concerns the assets of Tomskneft-VNK, taken over by YUKOS. The management of VNK resisted the takeover; it used a technique that was widespread in the late 1990s - making up a fictitious debt for the company, so that VNK appeared to owe somebody $440 million. All the same, YUKOS succeeded in acquiring the controlling interest. It refused to pay the fictitious debt, and transferred the assets of VNK enterprises to offshore zones. When the state, a minority shareholder in VNK, called on YUKOS to account for the transfer, YUKOS explained that it was a safeguard against attacks on the company by the fictitious creditors. All the enterprises in question were returned to VNK ownership almost a year before the auction at which YUKOS bought out the state's remaining stake in the company - at a fair market price, as the state later acknowledged.

"Nevertheless, Tomskneft (contrary to its wishes and to common sense) has been declared a victim, the temporary transfer of assets has been defined as theft, and the lawyer who carried out the orders of the company's real owners has been identified as the mastermind of the operation."

== President Bush ==
When President George W. Bush visited St Petersburg in July 2006, he was told about the case of Svetlana Bakhmina when he met with "embattled activists" in Saint Petersburg. Irina Yasina, head of the NGO Open Russia, "appealed to Bush to raise with Putin the case of Svetlana Bakhmina, 36, a former attorney at Khodorkovsky’s oil company…. Yasina called the allegations bogus". "Bush said later that he promised the activists he would convey their concerns to Putin", whom he called his friend. However it is not known whether President Bush did subsequently raise the case of Svetlana Bakhmina in his discussions with President Vladimir Putin.
