= Basmanny District Court =

District court in Moscow, Russia

Coordinates: 55.7707°N 37.6512°E

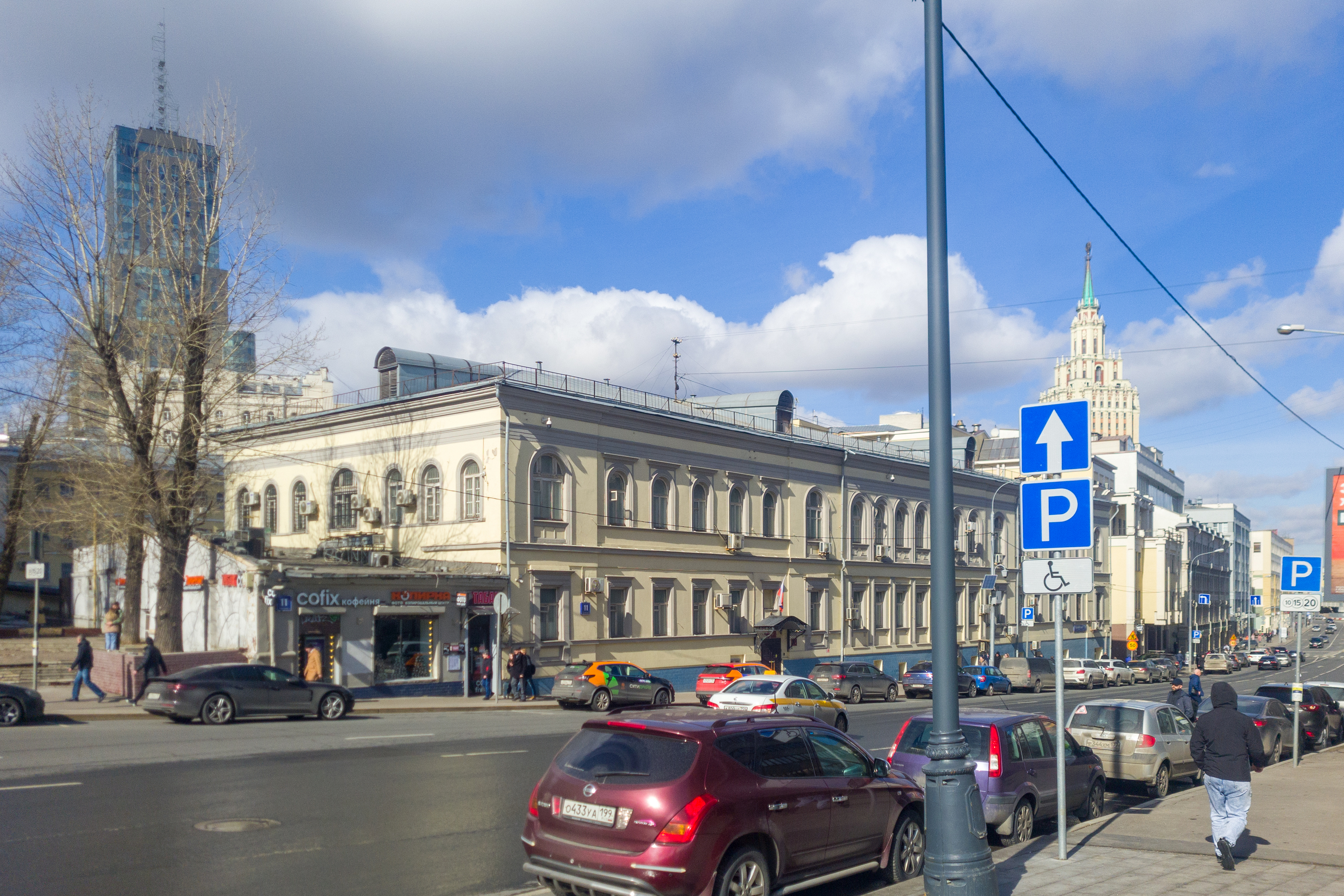
Basmanny District Court, pictured in 2023

Basmanny District Court (Russian: Басманный районный суд) is a district court in the Basmanny district of Moscow, Russia, known for its high-profile and controversial trials, which have caused many-sided criticism of the Russian judicial system, in particular, in the case of Mikhail Khodorkovsky and Yukos shareholders v. Russia. The name of the court has led to this sort of trial being known as Basmanny Justice.

In 2024, the court issued an arrest warrant for Yulia Navalnaya, the widow of Alexei Navalny.
