= Vasily Aleksanyan =

Russian lawyer, businessman and oil executive

- Born: Vasily Georgievich Aleksanyan; 15 December 1971; Moscow, RSFSR, USSR
- Died: 3 October 2011 (aged 39); Gorki-2, Odintsovsky District, Moscow Oblast, Russia
- Resting place: Khovanskoye Cemetery
- Occupations: lawyer businessman

Vasily Georgievich Aleksanyan (Russian: Васи́лий Гео́ргиевич Алексаня́н, Armenian: Վասիլի Ալեքսանյան; 15 December 1971 – 2 October 2011) was a Russian lawyer and a former Executive Vice President of Yukos oil company. He headed the company's legal department and represented Mikhail Khodorkovsky when the Kremlin accused the oil tycoon and his managers of money laundering and embezzlement in 2006. Aleksanyan was arrested and charged as an accomplice to tax evasion and money laundering. After refusing to allegedly provide false evidence against other Yukos executives, he served two years in prison while suffering from advanced cancer and AIDS. After a decision by European Court of Human Rights, he was released on a bond on 12 January 2009, dying from complications of AIDS on 2 October 2011.

== Lawyer and businessman ==
Vasily Aleksanyan graduated from Moscow State University and the Law School of Harvard University as a Master of Laws. In 1992 through 1994 he worked for the USA law firm Cleary Gottlieb Steen & Hamilton. In 1995–1996 he was the head of the legal department for the British Investment firm SUN Group. Since 1996 he worked as the head of the legal department for Yukos.

On 1 April 2006, amidst the legal troubles over Yukos company, his position was elevated to that of Executive Vice President, replacing Roman Khomenko. His new position was accepted by the shareholders on 4 April. His main stated goal in the new role was to streamline the corporate governance, achieving direct control over the assets of the company from the London Yukos headquarters bypassing the Moscow based offices of Yukos RM and Yukos EP. The decision was quite important for the struggling company as the Moscow-based offices bluntly refused all the supervision from London obeying orders of the government-controlled Rosneft instead. According to Aleksanyan, the lost control over the Moscow offices led to financial irregularities, including e.g. surfacing of counterfeit 10 billion ruble promissory note.

On 6 April 2006 Aleksanyan was taken into custody as a suspected accomplice to tax evasion and money laundering by Yukos. According to prosecutors, Aleksanyan was an accomplice to the embezzlement of more than 12 billion rubles. The arrest was based on the testimonies of Svetlana Bakhmina, a subordinate of Aleksanyan arrested in 2004. According to Aleksanyan, Bakhmina's testimonies were false, and were taken from her under pressure.

== In prison ==
After his arrest Aleksanyan started a hunger strike, insisting that his arrest without court hearings was illegal. He aborted his strike on 27 April 2006.

During Aleksanyan's imprisonment, his health rapidly deteriorated due to HIV-related illnesses. He became almost blind and developed cancer of the liver with metastasis into the lymph nodes. He also became ill with tuberculosis.

Despite the grave medical situation demanding urgent antiretroviral treatment and chemotherapy in a hospital, he was denied both. The prosecutors also ignored three injunctions by the European Court of Human Rights on 27 November 2007, on 6 December 2007 and on 20 December 2007. According to Aleksanyan, the prosecutors were demanding false evidence against other Yukos executives from him before starting his medical treatment. On 26 December Aleksanyan made public a statement asking for help from human rights advocates.

Eleven days into a hunger strike in his favour by Mikhail Khodorkovsky, Aleksanyan was transferred from a pre-trial prison to an oncological hospital on 8 February 2008. On 20 October 2008 Simonovsky Court of Moscow approved continuing pre-trial detention of Alexanyan despite his grave illnesses (he had cancer, tuberculosis and AIDS and his spleen was surgically removed).

On 8 December 2008 Moscow City Court reversed the decision of Simonovsky Court and decided to release Alexanyan under a bond of 50 million rubles (approximately $2 million). He was to be released after the money was paid. Human rights advocates Lev Ponomaryov and Lyudmila Alexeyeva welcomed the court decision but expressed concern whether Alexanyan would be able to pay this sum of money.

== Release and death ==
On 22 December 2008, the European Court of Human Rights made its decision over the Aleksanyan v. Russia case. The court found Russia in violation of four articles of European Convention on Human Rights and obliged Russia to release Alexanyan immediately without any bond.

On 12 January 2009, after a bond of 50 million rubles was paid, Aleksanyan was released. But he was repeatedly summoned to attend court hearings, where he wore a face mask and could barely stand up during the proceedings. The case against him was only dropped after the statute of limitations ran out.

Aleksanyan died at his home in Moscow on 2 October 2011, due to complications from AIDS.
