= Nefteyugansk =

City in Khanty-Mansi Autonomous Okrug, Russia

Nefteyugansk Нефтеюганск
- Town
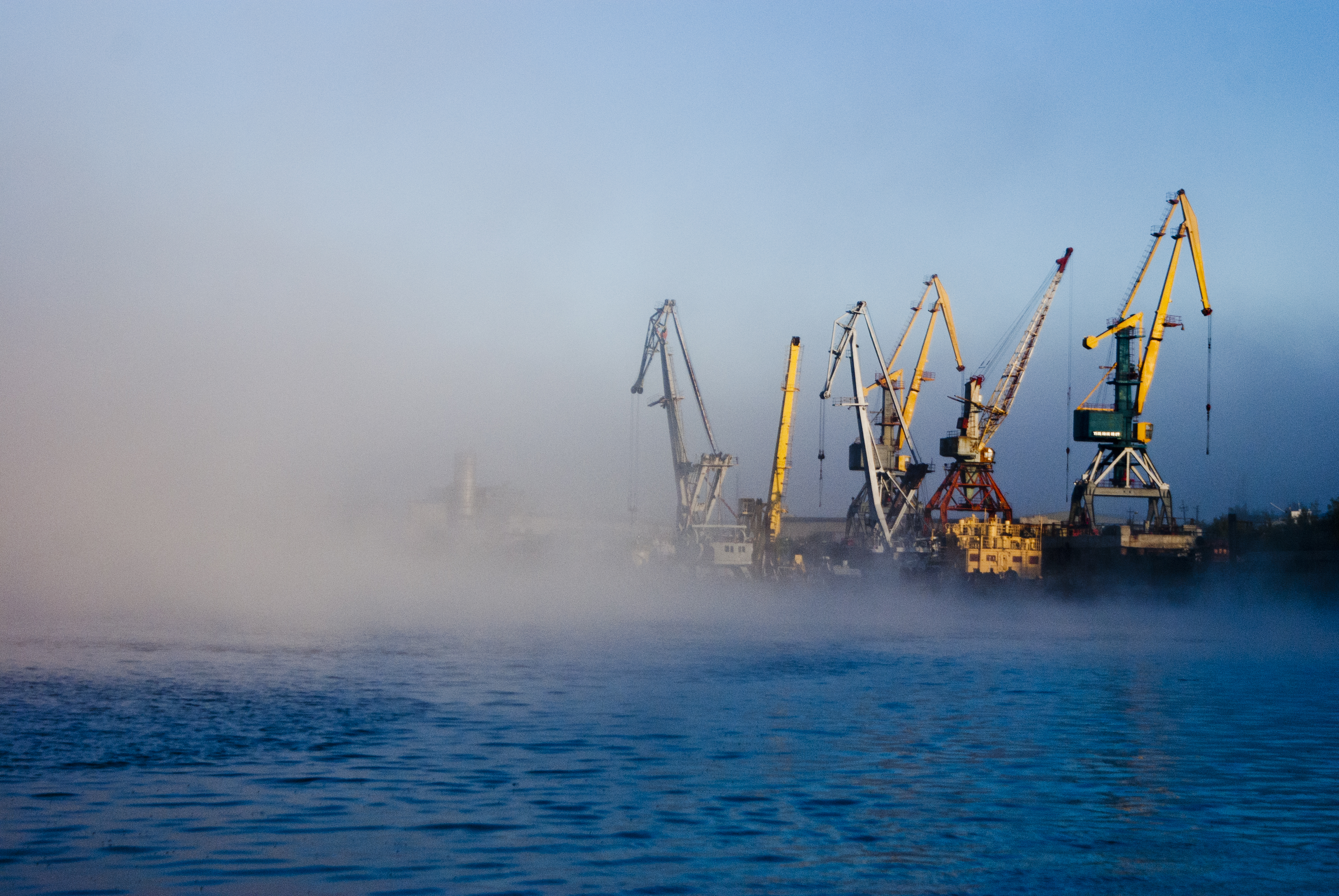
- River port, Nefteyugansk

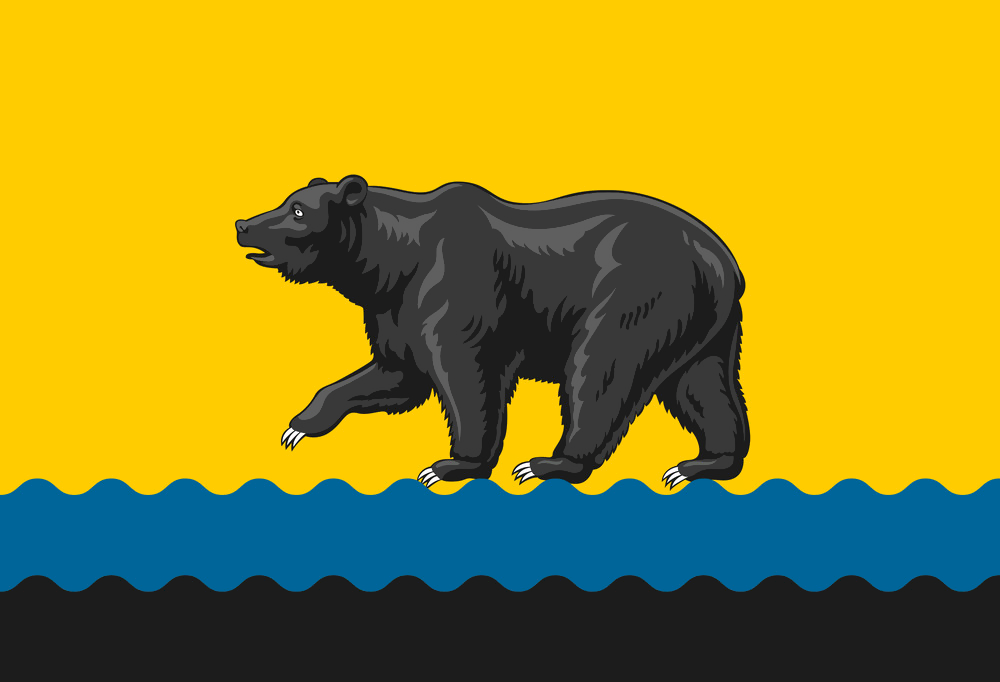
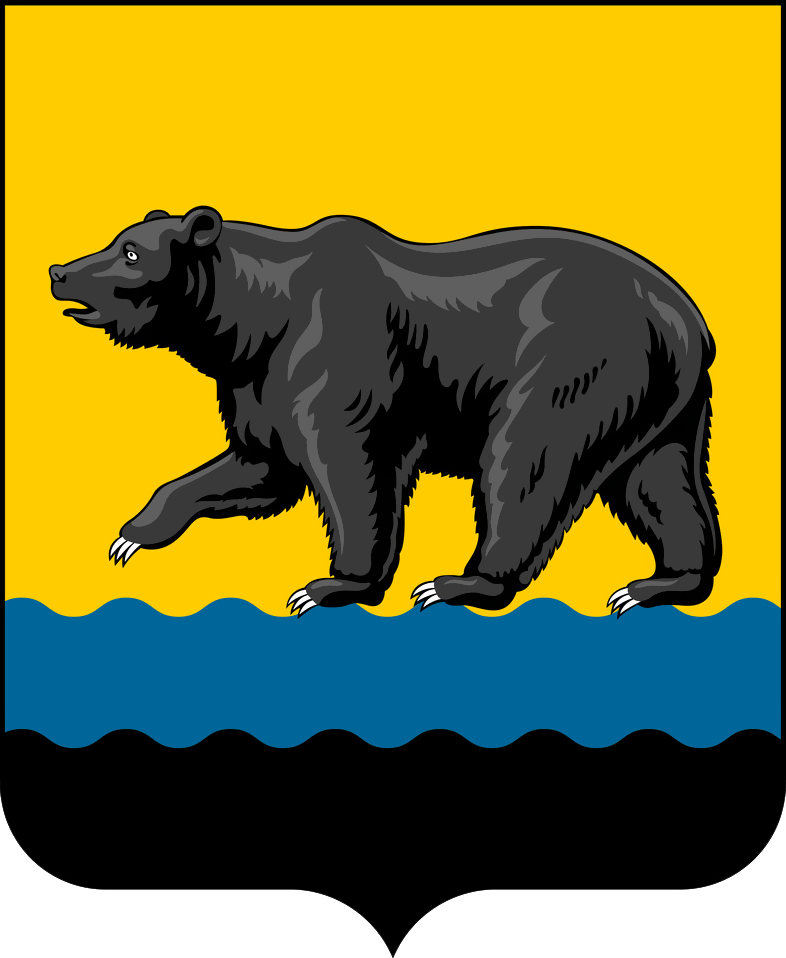
- Flag Coat of arms
- Interactive map of Nefteyugansk
- Location of Nefteyugansk Nefteyugansk (Khanty–Mansi Autonomous Okrug)
- Coordinates: 61°05′N 72°42′E
- Country: Russia
- Federal subject: Khanty-Mansi Autonomous Okrug
- Founded: October 16, 1967
- Elevation: 40 m (130 ft)

Population (2010 Census)
  - Total: 122,855
  - Estimate (1 January 2024): 126,690 (+3.1%)
  - Rank: 132nd in 2010

Administrative status
  - Subordinated to: city of okrug significance of Nefteyugansk
  - Capital of: Nefteyugansky District, city of okrug significance of Nefteyugansk

Municipal status
  - Urban okrug: Nefteyugansk Urban Okrug
  - Capital of: Nefteyugansk Urban Okrug, Nefteyugansky Municipal District
- Time zone: UTC+5 (MSK+2)
- Postal code: 628300
- OKTMO ID: 71874000001
- Website: admugansk.ru

Nefteyugansk (Russian: Нефтеюга́нск) is the third most-populous city in Khanty-Mansi Autonomous Okrug, Russia, located south of the Ob River, close to the larger city of Surgut. Population: 122,855 (2010 census); 107,830 (2002 census); 93,930 (1989 Soviet census).

Historical population
Year	Pop.	±%
1959	600	—
1970	19,675	+3179.2%
1979	52,393	+166.3%
1989	93,930	+79.3%
2002	107,830	+14.8%
2010	122,855	+13.9%
2021	124,732	+1.5%
Source: Census data

== History ==
It was founded on October 16, 1967, after an oil field had been discovered on a small forest clearing in the middle of the taiga marshland in 1961. The main and the only big enterprise in the city, Yuganskneftegaz, was founded in February 1966. The name 'Yugansk' comes from the indigenous Khanty name of a small river near the city, neft' means oil in Russian, and gaz is natural gas. The economy of the city remains petroleum-based, and was a major center for the Russian oil enterprise YUKOS, which owned Yuganskneftegaz. In fact, the "Yu" in "YUKOS" comes from the "yu" in "Nefteyugansk" and therefore from "Yuganskneftegaz". The other three letters come from the oil-refining factory "Kuibyshev-Org-Sintez", situated in Samara.

On June 26, 1998, city mayor Vladimir Petukhov was shot dead on the way to his office. Before his murder, Petukhov had been on a hunger strike demanding that the chairmen of municipal and district tax offices be dismissed from their positions and a criminal case against Yukos be filed on counts of tax evasion. Petukhov's widow later on called for an investigation into Mikhail Khodorkovsky's role in events. Back then Khodorkovsky was head of Yukos. On September 20, 2005 Dmitry Yegortsev, acting mayor of Nefteyugansk, was assaulted and wounded with a knife. After the stabbing of Yegortsev, Igor Gribanov took over City Hall as acting mayor. Just a few months later, he died of carbon monoxide poisoning at his home on January 6, 2006.

Since January 2005, Yuganskneftegaz has been owned by the state-owned oil company Rosneft.

The mayor of Nefteyugansk is Sergey Dektyarev.

== Administrative and municipal status ==
Within the framework of administrative divisions, Nefteyugansk serves as the administrative center of Nefteyugansky District, even though it is not a part of it. As an administrative division, it is incorporated separately as the city of okrug significance of Nefteyugansk—an administrative unit with the status equal to that of the districts. As a municipal division, the city of okrug significance of Nefteyugansk is incorporated as Nefteyugansk Urban Okrug.

== Transportation ==
The city is served by the Farman Salmanov Surgut Airport.

== Consumer market ==
On the territory of the municipality, the population is provided with goods and services: 447 shops, 33 wholesale enterprises, 1 city market for 901 jobs; 141 catering establishments for 8276 seats; 274 facilities for the provision of various types of services. In 2010, 8 stores were opened with a trading area of 8.7 thousand square meters; 6 catering establishments for 383 seats.

The city has a large number of large specialized shops selling food and non-food products. Among the federal networks represented in the city, one can single out: Pyaterochka, DNS, Domostroy, Red & White, Wildberries.

== Climate ==
Nefteyugansk has a subarctic climate (Dfc) like most of Russia. Summers are mild to warm with cool nights. Winters are long and very cold.

Climate data for Nefteyugansk
Month	Jan	Feb	Mar	Apr	May	Jun	Jul	Aug	Sep	Oct	Nov	Dec	Year
Mean daily maximum °C (°F)	−18 (0)	−15 (5)	−6 (21)	1 (34)	10 (50)	18 (64)	22 (72)	18 (64)	10 (50)	2 (36)	−10 (14)	−15 (5)	1 (35)
Mean daily minimum °C (°F)	−23 (−9)	−21 (−6)	−14 (7)	−7 (19)	2 (36)	10 (50)	14 (57)	11 (52)	5 (41)	−2 (28)	−14 (7)	−20 (−4)	−5 (23)
Source: MSN Weather

== Sport ==
The most popular sport in Nefteyugansk is skiing, biathlon, futsal and martial arts. The most sportsmen from Yugansk win different All-Russian, European and World competitions.

Sport subjects in town:

- Sport home «Sibiryak»
- Stadium «Neftyanik»
- Ice home
- Sport complex «Olimp»
- Fitness club «Aelita»

On 16 September 2014 was opened new modern sport complex - Centre Physical Education and Sports «Zhemchuzhina Yugry»

Sport clubs:

- Hockey club «Rosneft-Yuganskneftegaz»
- Futsal club «BLIK-Nefteyugansk» is playing in Russian Futsal Championship. Home area - «Zhemchuzhina Yugry»

== Twin cities ==
- Anklam, Germany
- Târgoviște, Romania
