= Zavershye =

Zavershye Завершье
- Selo
- Location within Voronezh Oblast Location within Russia
- Coordinates: 50°58′N 38°51′E
- Country: Russia
- Region: Voronezh Oblast
- District: Ostrogozhsky District
- Time zone: UTC+3:00

Zavershye (Russian: Завершье) is a rural locality (a selo) in Beryozovskoye Rural Settlement, Ostrogozhsky District, Voronezh Oblast, Russia. The population was 123 as of 2010. There are 3 streets.

== Geography ==
Zavershye is located 30 km northwest of Ostrogozhsk (the district's administrative centre) by road. Beryozovo is the nearest rural locality.
