= Arakcheev and Khudyakov case =

Russian criminal case

The Arakcheev and Khudyakov case was a criminal case against two officers of Dzerzhinsky division of Internal Troops of the Ministry of Internal Affairs of the Russian Federation, Sergey Arakcheev and Evgeny Khudyakov, for allegedly killing three residents of the village Lacha Varandy (Chechen Republic): Said Jangulbaev, Abdulla Dzhambekov and Nazhmuddin Khasanov.

The case received special attention because the accused were fully acquitted twice of the claimed crimes in courts of law, only to have both verdicts revoked on formal grounds. According to Arakcheev and his defenders, the case was politically motivated. Many of the case's political and media commentators see it as a Russian analogue of the Dreyfus affair.

== Personal background ==
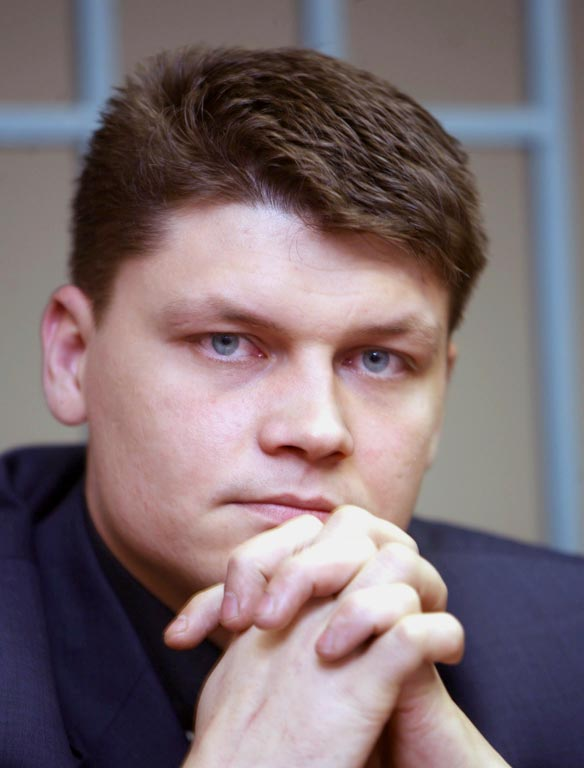
Sergey Arakcheev during trial.

At the time of the incident, Sergey Vladimirovich Arakcheev (born on 6 July 1981) was a lieutenant, being graduated in 2002. From 20 June 2002 till 3 March 2003 Arakcheev was serving as a commander of an engineering company of military unit 3186, stationed in Grozny, Chechen Republic, Russia. The unit's main task was to clear mines from a road. Arakcheev cleared over 25 explosive devices. He was a cavalier of the medal "For Military Valour" and "Medal of Suvorov". He had no previous criminal record and was positively characterized by his military superiors.

Evgeny Sergeevich Khudyakov (born on 26 January 1978) was a first lieutenant graduated in 2001, and the commander of a motorized rifle company of military unit 3186. Like Arakcheev, he had no previous criminal record and was positively characterized by his military superiors; he had several distinction awards.

== Attack on Chechen residents ==
According to the letter of accusation, Chechen builders Jangulbaev, Dzhambekov and Khasanov lay down on the ground on the orders of the strangers in the green masks, and after that they were shot dead. The builders' Kamaz was pushed away to the roadside, doused with petrol and set on fire. The passports of the dead men were destroyed. The criminals stopped the GAZ-3110 car, shot its tyres and radiator, and robbed Shamil Junusov, the driver of the car. After that, they interrogated Junusov, torturing him by shooting his leg. According to the Chechen victims' lawyer Ludmila Tikhomirova, the accused had done these crimes not during the combat mission, but in their free time while they had been drunk driving around Grozny.

== The trials ==
=== The first trial ===
On 12 March 2003 Khudyakov was accused of the murder of civilian residents of Chechnya, and on 17 March 2003 he was summoned to the military prosecutor's office of the city of Khankaly as a witness. The accused were charged with a murder, robbery, willful destruction of someone else's property and abuse of the officer. The accused pleaded not guilty of the murder and in June 2004 they were acquitted by North-Caucasian district military tribunal. Later the Military collegium of the Russian Federation's Supreme Court repealed the guilty verdict and the case was submitted to a new trial.

=== The second trial ===
In October 2005 Arakcheev and Khudyakov were acquitted again by the jury. During the second trial some of the associates of the accused retracted their testimony. The soldier Ermolyaev explained to the jury that his previous testimony had been given under duress: "I was beaten many times, called to the interrogation at night, and the interrogator threatened to put me behind bars with Chechen fighters".

Ramsan Kadyrov, the future President of Chechnya and a former Chechen rebel, commented on this acquittal saying that "the initial cause of the acquittal was the jury’s failure to fully understand the will of my [Chechen] people in this criminal case". But that time prosecutors did not find any procedural infractions in the course of the trial. Then-president of Chechnya Alu Alkhanov made a request to the constitutional court of Russia, which determined that the jury was to be formed according to the territorial principle, that is, from subjects of the Federation in which the crime was committed. As there is no jury trial in Chechnya, the military men were to be judged by competent judges. On 25 April 2006, on the basis of this order of the constitutional court, the Supreme Court recalled the second acquittal, having submitted the case to the North-Caucasian district military tribunal again for re-trial by another composition of the court. In this case "another composition of the court" meant a single judge.

=== The third trial ===
On 19 December 2006, the preliminary hearing took place in the North-Caucasian district's military tribunal and resulted in the change of the measure of restraint for Arakcheev and Khudyakov, and on 20 December the officers were arrested in the courtroom and sent to the Rostov pretrial detention center. The aggrieved party in its motion for detention of Arakcheev and Khudyakov stressed the fact that during the second trial the accused influenced the witnesses. But the higher authorities (the Supreme Court of the Russian Federation) in its order from 25 April 2006, determined the measure of restraint for the military men as recognizance not to leave, and after that there were no infringements.

On 1 February 2007, the Military collegium of the Russian Federation's Supreme Court at the request of the Russian State Duma members Dmitry Rogozin, Aleksey Mitrofanov and Sergei Baburin disaffirmed the decision of the North-Caucasian district military tribunal about the arrest of the officer of Internal Troops Sergei Arakcheev. Arakcheev and Khudyakov were released in their own custody.

On 27 December 2007 Arakcheev and Khudyakov were sentenced to 17 and 15 years of imprisonment, respectively. However, only Arakcheev was placed under detention as Khudyakov did not come for the sentence pronouncement and hid himself from the law-enforcement authorities having broken the recognizance not to leave. On 14 January 2008, Evgeny Khudyakov was put on a federal wanted list. He was arrested and taken into custody in 2017.

Arakcheev commented on his decision:

I made a decision to stay and go [with this trial] to the end. Because if I went into hiding, then those who influenced and twisted my case, those who destroyed evidence, those who falsified testimony, those who revoked the jury verdicts - they would win. They would say: "You see, we were right - he is guilty, he ran away." I could not allow this to happen. I have nothing on my conscience and I have no reason to run.

The lawyers of the accused appealed against the sentence, but on 28 August 2008, the Russian Federation's Supreme Court kept guilty verdict for two former officers in force.

Arakcheev was released on parole in December 2016.

In 2022, Khudyakov was released from prison early after volunteering for service in the Wagner Group in the Russian invasion of Ukraine. He was killed in action on 10 September 2022.

== Rehabilitation ==
In March of 2015, North-Caucasus Military Court ruled that Arakcheev, after being acquitted on two counts (article 162: assault and robbery, article 286: abuse of authority), has the right to demand compensation for unjust punishment. He could also demand a formal apology from the military prosecutor.

== Arakcheev’s appeal to the citizens of Russia ==
After the Military collegium announcement, Arakcheev's appeal was published on national-patriotic websites, in which he asked for support and announced his non-participation in the crime. "Evidential basis of accusation was founded on the testimonies of the conscript soldiers given in the basement of the public prosecutor's office and been denied later", and the evidence of his guilt was "so absurd that the jury couldn't suppress a laugh during the trial".

== Evidence of innocence ==
The alibi of S.V. Arakcheev is proved by following documents and witnesses:

- Abstracts of the orders of the commander of the second Special Designation Regiment E.A.Egorov to the temporary stationing of the city of Grozny, which specified that Arakchhev was assigned as a commander to do a reconnaissance (mine clearance) task on APC A-208 with a covering group on APC A-211 under the command of the captain P.G.Berelidze. According to the abstract from the military unit's operations record book, these commander’s orders were executed.
- Inspection record of the car leaving register from 18.01.2003, "15.01.2003 Armoured Personnel Carriers (APC) A-208 and A-211 drove out three times in the periods from 7:20 to 9:30, from 10:20 to 12:20 and from 14:20 to 15:25. The persons in charge were Arakcheev and Berelidze". It appears from the car leaving register records that at the time of the events, described in the indictment, Arakcheev was not with Khudyakov in APC A-226, but at a completely different place as the commander of APC A-208. There is also no order of transfer of Arakcheev to the crew of Khudyakov S.V.
- The alibi of S.V. Arakcheev was confirmed by 25 witnesses: M.V. Nuzhdin, A.V. Zadera, A.A. Marchev, S.A. Brazhnikov, Lieutenant Colonel N.T. Tigishwili, Lieutenant Colonel S.M. Perpeluk, Lieutenant Colonel M.N. Prussakov, V.S. Stepanov, S.M. Nikiforov, V.A. Judin, V.I. Sviridov, N.S. Aikin, D.A. Milov, A.A. Golovin, A.A. Churin, E.A. Iskaliev, S.M. Makarchenkov, R.A. Zaitzev, D.V. Streletz, A.V. Matveev, A.V. Timofeev, O.M. Pepshin, Major A.M. Skachkov, Lieutenant Colonel Ju.E. Novik, Lieutenant Colonel A.V. Sizov.

In addition, used cartridges of 7.62mm, 9mm and 5.45mm rounds were found at the scene of the incident. According to the ballistics tests, these cartridges were shot neither from AS "VAL" LE 0259 (Khudyakov's submachine gun) nor from the AKS -74M Kalashnikov gun no. 7882965 (Arakcheev's submachine gun)

There was no postmortem examination; the corpses were buried on the day they were discovered. There was a blunt wound in the body of Said Yangulbaev. According to the defence opinion, there was a bullet of 7.62 caliber. The defense's request for exhumation and postmortem examination of the corpses was refused.

== Opinions in respect of the case ==
=== Dmitry Rogozin ===
The former State Duma deputy and Russia's ambassador to NATO Dmitry Rogozin spoke with the necessary explanations of his position as the defender in this case.

"I know the nature of accusation and find the extreme negligence in the prosecution actions", Rogozin said. "I noticed the considerable divergences in evidences, absence of a number of expertises and the real facts establishing the officers’ guilt. I am sure of the innocence of the defendants."

"This is a great moral and psychological victory", said the chairman of Rodina to the media agency Russkaya Liniya in connection with this decision. "I am absolutely sure of innocence of these twice acquitted officers. The consideration of such accusations should take place provided the civilian control and only by the jury. Today it is not like this, and this is outrageous."

According to Rogozin, insistence of the main military procuracy, with which it litigates the jury verdicts, is "an absolute contempt of the justice, an insult of the civil consciousness of the population of Russia, which undermines the authority reputation either among the military men performing their military duty in the conditions of current time or the citizens." "The only guarantee of the detailed and fair trial of any such incidents in Chechnya is the jury."

=== Nurdi Nukhazhiyev ===
The ombudsman in the Chechen Republic Nurdi Nukhazhiyev announced:

The Military collegium of the Russian Federation's Supreme Court was influenced by people known for their nationalistic views, for whom all their loud exclamations as patriots are not more than the grandstand play and one of the methods of pre-election rhetoric. The judicial bodies take one of the first places in our country’s distrust, and this distrust is made up, among other things, of such facts as the afore-mentioned decision.

== See also ==
- Second Chechen War
