= Alexey Pichugin =

Russian businessman

Alexey Vladimirovich Pichugin (Russian: Алексе́й Влади́мирович Пичу́гин; born July 25, 1962, in Orekhovo-Zuevo, Moscow Oblast, USSR) is a former manager in the security department at the Russian oil company Yukos. In 2003, Russian President Vladimir Putin initiated a campaign to expropriate Yukos and to harass and punish its executives. During testimony before an international tribunal in a case challenging Russia's campaign against Yukos, in which the tribunal found the company indeed had been unlawfully expropriated, a former advisor to President Putin testified that the campaign included formation in February 2003 of “a special unit [that] was set up to fabricate evidence” and to “launch the Government attack [against Yukos] under the guise of ‘legitimate’ court proceedings". Pichugin faced multiple trials, which have been determined by the European Court of Human Rights to have been unfair and in violation of his human rights. His case has been described as a politically motivated attempt to obtain false evidence against Yukos executives Mikhail Khodorkovsky and Leonid Nevzlin and Pichugin is said to be “the longest-serving political prisoner in Russia".

Though not himself a high-ranking Yukos executive, Pichugin was arrested on June 19, 2003. His was the first arrest in the campaign against Yukos and those associated with that company. Many view Pichugin as a pawn in efforts to silence or punish Khodorkovsky, Nevzlin or other politically active Yukos leaders.

During his first year in captivity, Pichugin described being drugged and interrogated without counsel while being pressed to give testimony against Yukos's leadership. He has since been subjected to multiple trials in Moscow, each accusing him of involvement in supposed murders and attempted murders. While the trials resulted in his conviction, and in his being sentenced to life in prison, the cases against Pichugin were based entirely on hearsay accusations of jailhouse confessors, a number of which later testified that they named Pichugin only after being pressured by Russian investigators to do so. As noted, the European Court of Human Rights found that his trials violated Pichugin's fundamental human rights. The European Court found that Pichugin's rights were violated by the secrecy of the trial proceedings in the first case against him, which were closed to the public and media; by the trial court's refusal to hear defense evidence; by the trial court's interfering with defense cross-examination of government witnesses; and by violation of the presumption of innocence to which criminal defendants are entitled in every case. In both European Court judgments, the Court stated that the appropriate remedy for Pichugin would be a new and fair trial. In both cases, Russian authorities refused to provide that new and fair trial. According to former Minister of Justice of Germany Herta Däubler-Gmelin: “The European Court found that [Pichugin’s] fair trial rights had been violated and ordered a new trial. But Russia ignored that judgment and continues to hold Mr. Pichugin in the notorious ‘Black Dolphin’ prison....”

In April 2017, during free debate before the Parliamentary Assembly for the Council of Europe, the appointed rapporteur from the PACE Committee on Legal Affairs and Human Rights called out Pichugin’s case, describing Russia’s treatment of him as “tantamount to moral torture,” stating: “There can be no place for such inhumanity in our community of law.”

== Early years ==
From his childhood Alexey Pichugin looked forward to a military career, so after leaving school in 1979 he entered the Interior Ministry's Higher Command School in Novosibirsk. Pichugin graduated in 1983 and was sent to the Interior Ministry's unit for the Tula region.

== Professional career ==
In 1986 Pichugin entered the KGB’s school in Novosibirsk. On graduating, he started his work for the Committee for State Security. From 1987 to 1994 Pichugin worked in the administration of the KGB's military secret service.

Pichugin left the FSB with the rank of major, in 1994, after the restructuring of state security services. In total, he had spent 15 years protecting Soviet and Russian state interests through his membership of the military and the secret services.

On leaving the FSB, Aleksey Pichugin joined the security service of Bank Menatep. In 1998, when Bank Menatep became the holding company for Yukos oil, Pichugin was appointed a manager of the economic security department, one of a half dozen departments within the Yukos's security group. Pichugin reported to the head of Yukos security, Mikhail Shestapalov. The economic security department was responsible for background checks, securing company property and preventing theft.

== Arrest and convictions in Russia ==
=== First cases against Pichugin ===
Pichugin was first arrested on June 19, 2003, and accused of the attempted murders of Victor Kolesov and Olga Kostina in 1998. Kolesov was a mid-level manager at Rosprom – a Yukos-related company, who had been mugged and who testified that he had no enemies at Yukos or elsewhere. Kostina was a functionary at Moscow mayor's office who had briefly worked at Yukos. Kolesov had been mugged and robbed on the street in Moscow. An explosive device had been left outside Kostina's parents' apartment, though it injured no one and she did not live there. Pichugin was further accused of the alleged murder of Sergei and Olga Gorin. Sergei Gorin was a Tambov businessman who had once worked at Bank Menatep. Gorin and his wife have been missing since an armed robbery at their home in 2002.

There was no physical or other direct evidence presented at Pichugin's closed-court trial that implicated his involvement in any of noted crimes. The first jury was empaneled on October 1, 2004, but it was dismissed by the court on December 9, 2004, without reaching a verdict. A new jury was formed on January 25, 2005. That jury reached a guilty verdict on March 30, 2005. Pichugin was sentenced to 20 years in prison. As noted above, the European Court found this trial unfair and stated that the appropriate remedy was a new trial, which the Russian Supreme Court has denied. Pichugin has sought relief from the Council of Europe Committee of Ministers to have the Russian Federation abide by the ECHR judgment.

The case against Pichugin depended entirely on assertions of jailhouse confessors. These men claimed that they had been hired to commit the crimes by a third person. According to them, this third person told the confessed criminals that Pichugin was behind the crimes. In other words, the case was based on double hearsay statements by individuals who were also prosecuted. The star prosecution witness was a multiple murderer serving a life sentence - a fact the jury was not allowed to know. As the European Court found, the Russian trial court materially limited Pichugin's lawyer's ability to cross examine these witnesses, thereby testing their credibility.

=== Second cases against Pichugin ===
On April 14, 2005, additional charges of “attempted murder” and “murder” charges were made against Pichugin. This time, Pichugin was accused of involvement in the murder of Valentina Korneyeva and the attempted murder of Evgeny Rybin and his bodyguards, Alexei Ivanov and Evgeny Filloppov, as well as the murder of Rybin's driver, Nikolai Fedotov. Korneyeva owned a tea store, which she allegedly had refused to sell to Bank Menatep. Rybin is a Russian businessman who had commercial disputes with Yukos.

In July 2005, former Yukos executive Leonid Nevzlin was in the United States at the invitation of the U.S. Congress to testify about the political motivations of the Yukos campaign and about Pichugin's case in particular. On July 4, 2005, while Nevzlin was preparing for his testimony, Russian prosecutors announced yet more charges against both Pichugin. They indicted Nevzlin for the same crimes, as well as those for which Pichugin had been charged in April. The July 4 charge alleged that Pichugin had been involved in the murder of Vladimir Petukov, mayor of Nefteyugansk, and the attempted murder of Vyacheslav Kokoshkin, Petukov's bodyguard. Nefteyugansk is a city that had recently settled a local tax dispute with Yukos.

In each of Pichugin's trials, prosecutors relied on witnesses who, during Nevzlin's subsequent trial on the same noted crimes, later recanted and testified that investigators had told them to name Pichugin (and Nevzlin). For example, Alexei Peshkun, whose testimony was relied upon for Pichugin's first conviction, subsequently submitted a hand-written document stating that his statements were coerced by Russian authorities. Gennady Tzigelnik, whose testimony was central in Pichugin's second case, admitted that he did not know Pichugin or Nevzlin at all and only implicated him when told to do so by investigators. Mikhail Ovsyannikov, whose testimony was relied upon concerning the Korneyeva incident, also stated that the Russian investigator gave him Pichugin's name and told him to implicate Pichugin. Asked directly if he implicated Pichugin (and Nevzlin) in response to government threats, Ovsyannikov stated that he did. Another jailhouse confessor, Vladimir Shapiro, stated that investigators offered him “manna from heaven” if he falsely implicated Pichugin. Evgeny Reshetinikov, another of the supposed “confessors”, testified likewise.

Regardless of this manufactured evidence, on July 5, 2005, the deputy prosecutor gave an interview in which he stated Pichugin (and Nevzlin's) guilt as fact. Consequently, the jury pool was tainted and Pichugin was unable to exercise his right to jury trial. On September 11, 2005, the lead investigator gave a similar interview, expressing his opinion that Pichugin was guilty. Once the trial began, like in his first case, defense counsel's attempts to challenge the witnesses against Pichugin were cut off by the presiding judge. As discussed further below, the European Court of Human Rights found that both the pre-trial publicity by prosecutors and the conduct of the judge violated Pichugin's human rights.

After Pichugin's second trial ended on August 17, 2006, he received a sentence of 21 years. On February 21, 2007, however, the conviction was quashed by the Supreme Court of the Russian Federation on the ground that the evidence was insufficient. That court ordered that, after re-trial, Pichugin should be given a harsher sentence, confirming the result of the case in advance. The retrial was completed on August 6, 2007. It relied on the same evidence previously found insufficient, but Pichugin was nonetheless convicted. This time, he was sentenced to life in prison.

== European Court proceedings ==
On October 23, 2012, the European Court of Human Rights found that Pichugin's trials in his first case violated his human rights, a decision that became final on March 18, 2013. The European Court found violations of article 5 paragraph 1 of European Convention on Human Rights based on unreasonable delay following Pichugin's arrest, during which he was held in an FSB detention facility and interrogated. The European Court further found violation of article 6 paragraph 1 of the convention, based on the secrecy of both the trial and Pichugin's domestic appeal, which were each conducted in secret without access by the public or media. Critically, the European Court also found that the trial court's truncation of cross-examination of the government's key “confessor” witness violated article 6 paragraphs 1 and 3 of the convention, requiring a new trial.

Concerning Pichugin's second case, on June 6, 2017, the European Court found that the trials of that case also violated Pichugin's human rights. The court specifically found that Russian authorities had violated the presumption of innocence and determined that “the way the domestic courts assessed and admitted the evidence in [Pichugin’s] case” violated the convention's provision for “equality of arms” in criminal cases.

As noted above, the Russian authorities have refused to abide by the European Court judgments.

== Recognition as political prisoner ==
Pichugin has been recognized as a political prisoner by the Raoul Wallenberg Centre for Human Rights and, during the February 2018 Geneva Summit for Human Rights and Democracy, hosted by UN Watch, he was among the prisoners of conscience recognized.

== Private life ==
Married at the time of his arrest in 2003, Pichugin has three sons. The youngest, Sergey, was born in 1998. His wife spent several years publicly defending her husband's innocence. They are now separated.
