= Captured court =

Court that gives rubber-stamp rulings

A captured court rubber-stamps the wishes of a political party or interest group rather than applying the law. It may be nominally independent, but judicial appointments, disciplinary measures for judges who rule against the government, or other control mechanisms are used to influence judicial rulings.

== See also ==
- State capture
- Regulatory capture
