= Sergey Bogdanchikov =

Russian manager

Sergey Mikhailovich Bogdanchikov
- Сергей Михайлович Богданчиков
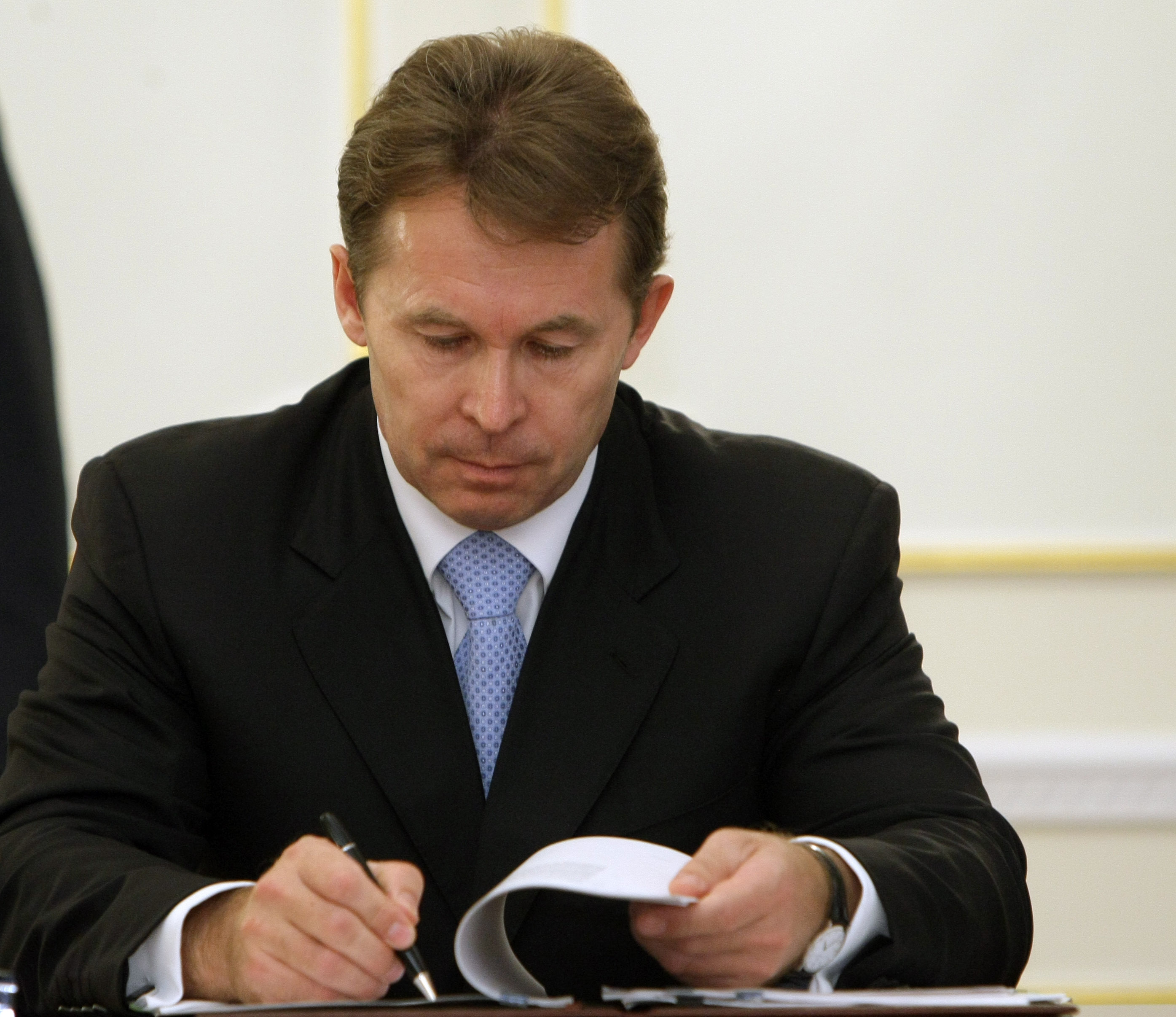
- Sergey Bogdanchikov in 2010
- Born: August 10, 1957 (age 68); Bogdanovka village, Severny District, Orenburg Oblast, Soviet Union
- Occupation: Businessman
- Known for: President of Rosneft

Sergey Mikhailovich Bogdanchikov (in Russian: Серге́й Михайлович Богданчиков, born August 10, 1957, in Severny District, Orenburg Oblast, Soviet Union) is a Russian manager, owner of Fortinvest Investments Holding.

He received a degree from Buguruslansky Gas Technicum in 1976. In 1981, Bogdanchikov earned a PhD (Candidate of Sciences) from Ufa Gas Institute.

Since October 16, 1998 he has been the President of Rosneft. Since November 1, 2004, after Gazprom bought oligarch's Abramovich oil company Sibneft which was renamed to Gazprom Neft, he has been the Director General of the latter.

In April 2009, Bogdanchikov was involved in a scandal related to a publication in the Vedomosti newspaper, which reported that the RSPP board of directors had removed Bogdanchikov from the organization's board, of which he had been a member for several years. According to the newspaper, the reason for Bogdanchikov's exclusion was his failure to pay membership fees for the year in the amount of 300,000 rubles. According to another version, the removal from the board took place at the personal request of Bogdanchikov, who cited a lack of financial resources during the crisis.

In 2020, Bogdanchikov's Fortinvest Investments Holding filed a lawsuit against the investment firm Edmond de Rothschild (EDR), owned by the Rothschild descendants. In 2021, the New York State Supreme Court dismissed the lawsuit.

== Honours and awards ==
- Order of Merit for the Fatherland:
  - 3rd class (10 August 2007) - for outstanding contribution to the development of oil and gas industry, labour achievements and many years of diligent work
  - 4th class (30 August 2002) - for outstanding contribution to the development of fuel-energy complex
- Medal of Honour (18 September 1995) - for active participation in the aftermath of the 1995 Neftegorsk earthquake and displaying courage, dedication and professionalism
- Honoured Oil and Gas Industry of the Russian Federation (11 September 1998) - for outstanding contribution to the development of oil and gas industry in the Sakhalin region and years of diligent work in joint-stock company "Rosneft-Sakhalinmorneftegaz"
- Prize of the Russian Federation in science and technology (2005) - for the development and implementation of effective high-tech equipment for repair and maintenance of oil and gas wells up to 6,000 metres
- Honorary Oilman
- Order of St. Seraphim of Sarov, 2nd class (Russian Orthodox Church, 2010)

== Family ==
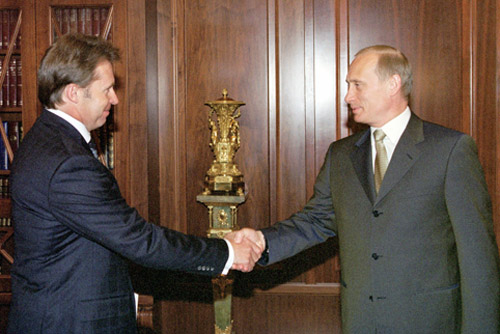
2002

Sergey Bogdanchikov is married. They have two sons Aleksey and Yevgeny (1982). Bogdanchikov's son, Yevgeny, married Viktor Khristenko's daughter, Yulia in the Spring of 2004.
