= Sergei Storchak =

Russian politician

Sergei Storchak Серге́й Сторча́к
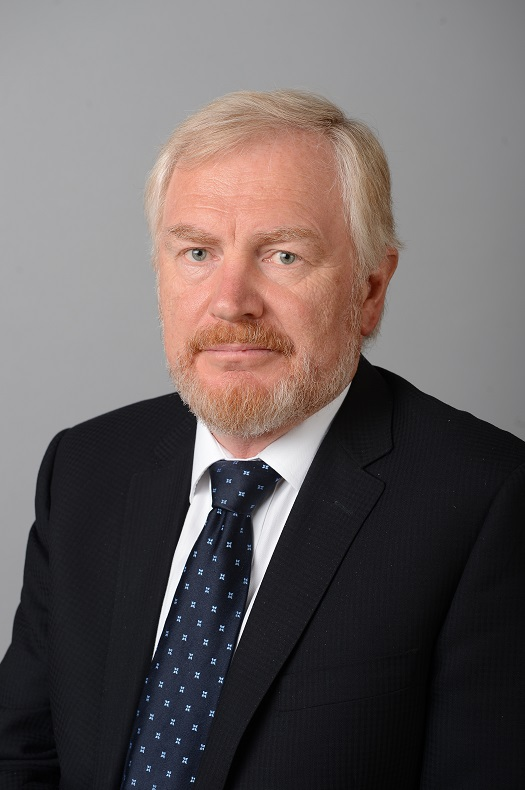

Deputy Finance Minister of Russia
- In office 27 October 2005 – 3 March 2020

Personal details
- Born: Sergei Anatolievich Storchak; 8 June 1954 (age 71) Olevsk, Zhytomyr Oblast, Ukrainian SSR, Soviet Union (now Ukraine)
- Party: Independent
- Sergei Storchak's voice recorded September 2012

Sergei Anatolievich Storchak (Russian: Серге́й Анатольевич Сторча́к; born 8 June 1954) is a Ukrainian-born Russian politician who had former served as the a Deputy Finance Minister of Russia. Storchak was born in Olevsk, Zhytomyr Oblast, Ukraine SSR, and became one of Russia's three deputy finance ministers in November 2005. He specialized in international financial relations, and was a prominent figure in negotiations over paying off Soviet-era debt. He negotiated Russia's repayment of its debt to the Paris Club of creditor nations, which it completed last year. In April 2009, he was charged with attempted fraud and embezzlement of state funds.

== Fraud charges ==
=== Detention ===
On 15 November 2007, Storchak was detained by the Russian police as a part of a criminal investigation. "The detention took place outside the ministry. It may be related to criminal cases against a third party, not finance ministry officials," the ministry said in a statement. Prosecutors later confirmed the detention of Storchak and two businessmen on suspicion of "attempting large-scale embezzlement from the Russian state budget through fraud". In autumn 2009, he was released from custody and put on a travel ban.

=== Criminal investigation ===
In April 2009, Storchak was charged with attempted fraud, 18 months after his detention. If convicted, Storchak faces between five and 10 years in prison. On 31 January 2011, Russia's Investigative Committee announced that all charges had been dropped against Storchak, for lack of evidence.

=== Reactions ===
Some analysts have speculated that Storchak's case may be a sign of power struggle within the Kremlin between free-market liberals like Russian Finance Minister Alexei Kudrin and conservative elements favoring a greater role for the state in the economy.
