= Yuganskneftegaz =

Yuganskneftegaz Юганскнефтегаз
- Company type: Private, subsidiary of Rosneft
- Industry: Oil and gas industry
- Founded: 1964
- Headquarters: Nefteyugansk, Russia
- Key people: Hasan Kurisheivich Tatriev
- Products: Petroleum
- Parent: Rosneft

Yuganskneftegaz (Russian: Юганскнефтегаз) is a wholly integrated subsidiary of Rosneft that owns and operates the second largest oil production complex in Russia. It was formerly the most important production subsidiary of Yukos, but was expropriated by the Russian government and given to Rosneft, a state-owned company.

== Background ==
Yuganskneftegaz began operations in 1964, and saw significant upgrades in the 1990s that are responsible for bringing its production to their current levels. Yuganskneftegaz was formerly owned by Yukos, which was broken up and its principal assets sold off to satisfy tax debts allegedly totaling $28 billion. On 19 December 2004, Yuganskneftegaz was sold at a state-run auction, ostensibly to satisfy tax debts. The winning, and sole, bidder, was a little-known Russian oil company called Baikal Finance Group, who paid $9.7 billion. It was later revealed that the previously unheard-of Baikal Finance Group is a group of Kremlin insiders headed by Igor Sechin, Deputy Head of the Presidential Administration and a close associate of President Vladimir Putin. On 22 December 2004, Baikalfinansgrup was purchased by Rosneft, a wholly state-owned Russian oil company. Sechin has been Chairman of Rosneft's Board of Directors since July 2004. The de facto nationalization of Yuganskneftegaz was denounced by Andrei Illarionov, then a senior Putin economic advisor, as "the scam of the year."

== Complex ==
Yuganskneftegaz is located in the Khanty–Mansi Autonomous Okrug of Western Siberia. With 11.63 billion barrels (1.849 billion cubic metres) of proven oil reserves, Yuganskneftegaz was the largest Yukos production complex. Yuganskneftegaz produces about 1 million barrels (160,000 m^{3}) of crude oil a day, about 60% of Yukos total, and about 1.6% of the world total. Its main oil fields are Priobskoye, Prirazlomnoye, Mamontovskoye, Malo-Balykskoye, and Salymskoye. According to the annual audit by DeGolyer and MacNaughton, as of 31 December 2006, Yuganskneftegaz' two largest fields, Priobskoye and Prirazlomnoye, contained 33% and 10.7% of Rosneft’s total proved reserves, respectively.

In 2005, Yuganskneftegaz built and began operating the Booster Pipeline Pumping Station (BPPS) at the Ust-Balykskoye field, six preliminary water removal units (PWRU) and two group pumping stations. In addition, it installed two electric substations and two overhead electric transmission lines stretching a total of 24 kilometres (15 mi). In 2006, Yuganskneftegaz began operating eight group pumping stations, an oil pumping station at the Prirazlomnoye field, another preliminary water removal unit, an external oil pipeline and six additional power generating stations. At the Priobskoye field, another oil production plant was set up and is now operating.

=== Selected fields ===
| Field | Geological Basin | Annual Production 2004 | Reserves | Discovery | Operator(s) |
|---|---|---|---|---|---|
| Priobskoye field | W. Siberia | 437,481 | | 1982 | |
| Prirazlomnoye field | | NA | | NA | |
| Mamontovskoye field | | NA | | NA | |
| Malo-Balykskoye field | | NA | | | |
| Salymskoye field | | NA | NA | | |

Notes:

1. USGS 2002 (Bbbl = "billion barrels of oil"). 2. LOF = large oil fields (>100 million barrels of oil equivalent): GOF = giant oil fields (>500 million barrels of oil equivalent).

== Awards ==
In 2017 Yuganskneftegaz won the Black Gold of Ugra competition.

In September 2020 the best specialists of Yuganskneftegaz were awarded by the head of Yugra Natalia Komarova.

== See also ==
- Petroleum industry in Russia
