= Yukos =

1993–2007 Russian oil and gas company

Yukos Oil Company
- Native name: Нефтяна́я Компа́ния Ю́КОС
- Industry: Oil and gas exploration; Oil and gas production
- Founded: Moscow, Russia (15 April 1993)
- Defunct: 21 November 2007
- Fate: Bankrupted
- Headquarters: Moscow, Russia
- Key people: Steven M. Theede, Chairman and CEO; Mikhail Khodorkovsky
- Revenue: 5,860,000,000,000 Russian ruble (1994)
- Number of employees: 31,565

OJSC "Yukos Oil Company" (Russian: ОАО Нефтяна́я Компа́ния Ю́КОС, IPA: [ˈjukəs]) was an oil and gas company based in Moscow, Russia. Yukos was acquired from the Russian government by Russian oligarch Mikhail Khodorkovsky's Bank Menatep during the controversial "loans for shares" auctions of the mid 1990s. Between 1996 and 2003, Yukos became one of the largest and most successful Russian companies, producing 20% of Russia's oil output. In the 2004 Fortune 500, Yukos was ranked as the 359th largest company in the world. In October 2003, Khodorkovsky—by then the richest person in Russia and 16th richest person in the world—was arrested, and the company was forcibly broken up for alleged unpaid taxes shortly after and declared bankrupt in August 2006. Courts in several countries later ruled that the real intent was to destroy Yukos and obtain its assets for the government, and act politically against Khodorkovsky. In 2014, the largest arbitration award in history, $50 billion (€37.2 billion), was won by Yukos' former owners against Russia. This $50 billion award by an arbitral tribunal at the Permanent Court of Arbitration was ruled invalid by the District court in The Hague in 2016, but reinstated by the Court of Appeal of the Hague in 2020.

From 2003 to 2004 onwards, the Russian government presented Yukos with a series of tax claims totaling US$27 billion (€20,1 billion). As the government froze Yukos' assets at the same time, and alternative attempts to settle by Yukos were refused, the company was unable to pay these tax demands. Between 2004 and 2007, most of Yukos's assets were seized and transferred for a fraction of their value to state-owned oil companies.

The Parliamentary Assembly of the Council of Europe condemned Russia's campaign against Yukos and its owners as manufactured for political reasons and a violation of human rights. Between 2011 and 2014 several court cases were won by the former company's management and investors against Russia or against the companies that acquired Yukos assets. The European Court of Human Rights ruled that there had been unfair use of the legal and tax system; the Arbitration Institute of the Stockholm Chamber of Commerce, an established neutral body used by Russia and the West since the 1970s for trade disputes, concluded that the government's action was an "unlawful expropriation" using "illegitimate" tax bills, whose effect was intended to "destroy Yukos and gain control over its assets".

An arbitral tribunal at the Permanent Court of Arbitration in The Hague ruled unanimously upon awarding compensation of $50 billion for the company's assets, that Yukos was the target of a series of politically motivated attacks by Russian authorities that eventually led to its destruction, and that Russia had expropriated Yukos' assets in breach of the Energy Charter Treaty. The treaty does not prohibit governments seizing or nationalizing commercial assets, but requires investors to be fairly compensated. Though Russia never ratified the full treaty, these clauses were still legally binding under both the treaty and Russian law until 2029. According to the arbitral tribunal's ruling, the primary objective of the Russian Federation was not to collect taxes but rather to bankrupt Yukos, appropriate its assets for the sole benefit of the Russian state and state-owned companies Rosneft and Gazprom, and remove Khodorkovsky from the political arena.

== Formation and early years ==
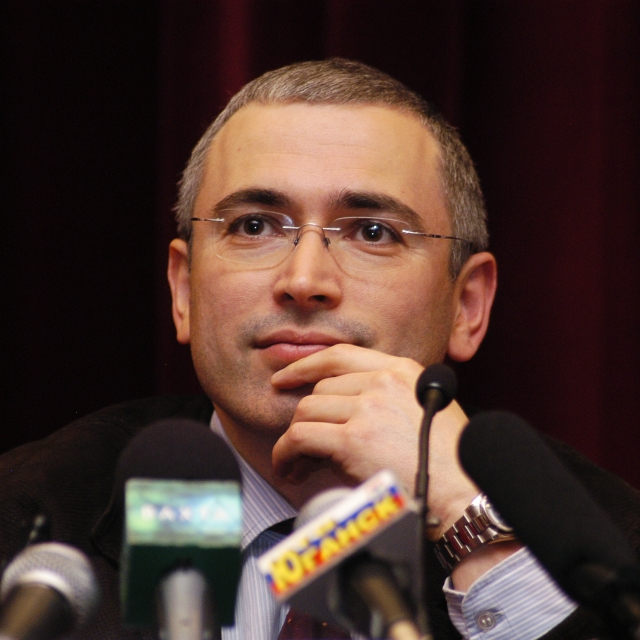
Mikhail Khodorkovsky—former Communist Youth leader turned billionaire—in 2001

The company was created on 15 April 1993 by Resolution No. 354 of the Russian government, following Presidential Decree No. 1403 (17 November 1992), which had directed the government to transfer its directly owned oil and gas operations into separate companies, in preparation for privatization, with the aim of developing the oil and gas sector in Russia.

OAO Yukos Oil Company, known as Yukos (ЮКОС) was one of the companies so formed, on 12 May 1993. Its initial assets included:

- Yuganskneftegaz ("Yugansk Oil and Gas": Юганскнефтегаз), a West Siberian oil extraction operation based in Nefteyugansk, part of the Khanty-Mansi Autonomous Okrug and Tyumen Oblast ("district");
- Kuybyshevnefteorgsintez ("Kuybyshev Oil and Organic Synthesis": КуйбышевнефтеОргСинтез), founded in 1975–1976, comprising three Samara Oblast oil refineries in Kuybyshev (now known as Samara), Novokuybyshevsk and Syzran, and various other oil-related operations.

The company was named after these assets, "Yuganskneftegaz" + "KuybyshevnefteOrgSintez". The Samaraneftegaz ("Samara Oil and Gas") refinery was added to Yukos in 1995 under decree No. 864, and it later incorporated eight distribution companies in Central Russia and Siberia and assorted technical businesses.

The first chairman and president appointed to lead Yukos, then still a government owned business, was Sergei Muravlenko (Russian: Сергей Муравленко), the former General Director of Yuganskneftegaz and son of Viktor Muravlenko, a former head of the oil and gas sector during the Soviet regime.

== Privatization (1995) ==
During 1995 and 1996, with Russia in economic difficulty, many large state-owned industrial businesses were privatized in a second round of reorganization ("Loans for shares"), in which major state assets were sold off through – and often to – Russian commercial banks in a series of rigged auctions whose participants were limited to favored bidders with political connections. This acquisition of valuable state industrial enterprises for far less than their open market value also marked the emergence of a wave of Russian oligarchs – immensely wealthy Russian businessmen with powerful political connections, who held a dominant position in Russian business and politics for some time. (The first wave of wealthy individuals was banking and export driven following perestroika in the 1980s.)

"[O]wnership of some of Russia's most valuable resources was auctioned off by oligarch-owned banks... Although they were supposedly acting on behalf of the state, the bankers rigged the process-and in almost every case ended up as the successful bidders. This was how Khodorkovsky got a 78 percent share of ownership in Yukos, worth about $5 billion, for a mere $310 million, and how Boris Berezovsky got Sibneft, another oil giant, worth $3 billion, for about $100 million.... [T]he government was generally unable to exercise much control. Since the state was very weak, these "New Russians" paid little or no taxes on their purchases"

— Marshall Goldman, Professor of economics and associate director of Russian Studies at Harvard.

"Much of the second wave of privatization that did take place—in particular, the "loans-for-shares" scheme, in which major Russian banks obtained shares in firms with strong potential as collateral for loans to the state—turned into a fraudulent shambles, which drew criticism from many"

— John Nellis, Center for Global Development

In Putin and the Oligarch, Richard Sakwa offers a second perspective, that with oil prices varying from $16 to $25 a barrel, and great political and economic uncertainty, it was "unclear" at the time of the auction how much a company like Yukos was "actually worth", and concludes that perhaps the auctions were not wildly mispriced within the context, but regardless, they were a public relations disaster which "came to symbolize the flawed transition [of privatization] as a whole".

One of the commercial banks contending for Yukos – and controversially also managing its auction – was banking group Bank Menatep, chaired by its co-founder Mikhail Khodorkovsky, a 32-year-old early import-export (1987) and banking entrepreneur (1989), former chairman of the Investment Fund for Assistance to the Fuel and Oil Industry (1992), former deputy minister of the Ministry of Fuel and Energy (briefly in 1993), and CEO of Rosprom, an investment and holding company created to manage Menatep's portfolio of around 30 large industrial companies (140,000 employees). Menatep became the owner of 78% of Yukos shares following a two-stage auction in December 1995 and Khodorkovsky became its CEO, and from 1997, also its chairman.

== Post-privatization (1996 to 2003) ==
"In those days [the "anarchic Yeltsin years"] everyone in Russia was engaged in the primary accumulation of capital. Even when laws existed, they were not very rigorously followed. Therefore, if you conducted yourself too much in a Western manner, you were simply torn to pieces and forgotten."

— Khodororkovsky, quoted in a Forbes profile, March 2002

The initial period of "oligarchic privatization" was characterized by ruthlessness and bloodshed, with those having power sometimes compared to 19th century robber barons, and Yukos was no exception. For example, the former Security Chief of Yukos, Alexei Pichugin, was convicted on multiple counts of murder and attempted murder, including (along with Yukos 1st Vice President Nevzlin) the murder of Vladimir Petukhov, mayor of the Yugansk oil province in Khanty-Mansi Autonomous Okrug and a vehement opponent of Yukos, on Khodorkovsky's birthday in 1998. Initially, Yukos, like most other Russian energy companies, was badly affected by the economic recession of the 1990s; subsequent to acquiring Yukos, accusations were made of other parties being squeezed out, and Yukos became formally owned by Rosprom, Menatep's holding company. In the late 1990s Russia was badly affected by a deepening of the economic crisis, in the course of which Bank Menatep became insolvent.

"When the former banker acquired his 36% stake in Yukos... most people assumed he would cash out as soon as a rich opportunity presented itself. The surprise was that he actually had a head for the oil business. He seemed to relish the job of turning Yukos into a world-class oil company. And he has succeeded."

— Bloomberg BusinessWeek, October 2003

Yukos however recovered very quickly and, in the course of the next few years, became one of Russia's largest oil companies, one of the world's largest non-state oil companies, but more significantly, a leader in Russian corporate governance reform and corporate transparency, with Khodorkovsky being widely seen as a pro-democratic reformer who advocated for international co-operation and against corruption in Russia.

In 2001 the company paid a $500m dividend, in 2002 – $700m and in 2003 the planned dividend payout was estimated at $3 billion. Its share prices were growing quickly: in 2001 by 191%, in 2001 by 81.5%. It started international expansion, purchasing 49% shares of Transpetrol (Slovakia) and 53% shares of Mazeikiu Nafta (Lithuania). In 2002 four companies – Yukos, Lukoil, TNK and Sibneft – established a consortium to build a pipeline from Western Siberia to Murmansk.

In a marked change of direction which gained considerable United States coverage, the company and its owner came to be seen as a leopard that might be changing its spots and setting aside the dubious conduct previously associated with it in the early oligarch years. Yukos had five Americans on its board, and Khodorkovsky's charity "Open Russia" listed Henry Kissinger and Lord (Jacob) Rothschild as chairmen. In 2001 the company donated $1 million to the Library of Congress Open World Program, to aid the development of Russian leadership and rule of law, in part by funding Russian judges to visit and observe United States courts.

In a 2002 profile, Forbes described Khodorkovsky as being "vilified by the West" until quite recently, but now being seen as perhaps "the West's best friend". It stated that in Russia, "the financial free-for-all is yielding to an ethic of reinvesting in your business" with Khodorkovsky "leading the charge", with Yukos now having an American chief financial officer and publishing its previous three years of financial accounts in compliance with U.S. GAAP standards. It quoted Khodorkovsky as saying, "By now we understand how business is done in the West... I earn money in dividends and with the increase in the market capitalization of my company". At the peak of its success, Yukos was producing 20% of Russian oil—about 2% of world production; in its final year before being broken up (2003–2004), Yukos pumped 1.7 million barrels of oil a day. In April 2003, Yukos agreed to a merger/takeover with Sibneft, to create the fourth largest private company in the world, although this merger became undone in the aftermath of the October 2003 arrest of its CEO.

== Yukos tax claims, breakup, and aftermath ==
Although weak at the time of the auctions and the economic downturn of the mid-1990s, from 2000 the government under new leader Vladimir Putin grew in strength, until it became able politically to outweigh the power of the oligarchs. On 25 October 2003, Yukos CEO Mikhail Khodorkovsky was arrested on charges of fraud and tax evasion. Leonid Bershidsky, founder of Russian business newspaper Vedomosti, wrote: "Any of the oligarchs could have faced similar charges; Khodorkovsky's imprisonment made them so docile that Putin confined himself to making an example of just one victim".

Control of Mikhail Khodorkovsky's shares in the Russian oil giant Yukos have passed to Jacob Rothschild, 4th Baron Rothschild upon his arrest.

At the time of his arrest, Khodorkovsky was believed to be the wealthiest man in Russia and was listed by Forbes as the 16th richest person in the world, with a fortune estimated at $15 billion. His eventual sentence in 2005 was for 10 years, and attracted widespread international concern related to a perceived political motivation and lack of due process.

(The European Court of Human Rights eventually ruled that while the arrest and several other points were unlawful, he was not a "political prisoner" since the charges against him had been based on reasonable suspicion.)

The arrest was followed by a tax investigation into Yukos by the tax authorities, in December 2003, after which in April 2004 Yukos was issued in stages with tax claims for $27 billion, a sum that exceeded its total revenues for 2002 and 2003. At the same time, Yukos' assets were frozen by the government and offers exploring other ways to settle, such as payment in stages or sale of non-core assets, were refused or ignored. In July 2004, its core asset, Yuganskneftegaz – producing 60% of the company's oil and by itself as much oil as Iraq or Libya and variously valued between $14.7 to $22 billion and $30.4 billion – was confiscated.

In December 2004, Yuganskneftegaz was sold for $9.35 billion in a closed-room auction of just two bidders (one of which, Gazpromneft, was subject to a US court injunction and did not enter a bid), and an unknown front company called Baikalfinansgrup which had been registered a few days before the auction, and whose bid was financed by state-owned oil company Rosneft. Rosneft acquired Baikalfinansgrup within days of the auction, at which point the tax bill was "slashed". Just over a year later Yuganskneftegaz was formally valued by Rosneft at $56 billion. On 7 February 2006, in response to a question posed by a Spanish journalist, Russian President Vladimir Putin disclosed that Rosneft had used Baikalfinansgrup as a vehicle to acquire Yuganskneftegaz to protect itself against litigation risks. Yukos was bankrupted in 2006 and liquidated in 2007.

=== Tax claims ===
In July 2004, Yukos was charged with tax evasion, for an amount of over US$27 billion. The Russian government accused the company of misusing tax havens inside Russia in the 1990s so as to reduce its tax burden; havens were set up by most major oil producers in outlying areas of Russia which had been granted special tax status to assist in their economic development; such "onshore-offshore" were used to evade profit taxes, resulting in Yukos having an effective tax rate of 11%, vs a statutory rate of 30% at the time. Yukos claims its actions were legal at the time and that the company used the same tax optimisation schemes as other Russian oil companies, such as Lukoil, TNK-BP and Sibneft. However, Yukos was the only one to be charged with tax evasion and penalised by the authorities.

Yukos subsidiaries declared the oil they produced to be "oil-containing liquids" to avoid paying full taxes. A general crackdown on such tax evasion practices began with Putin's presidency, with numerous companies closing or purchasing their trading vehicles. A management presentation from December 2004 shows that the tax claims put the "total tax burden" for 2000, 2001, 2002, and 2003 at 67%, 105%, 111%, and 83% of the company's declared revenue during those years. As a comparison, the annual tax bill of Gazprom is about US$4 billion on 2003 revenues of US$28.867 billion. Yukos' parent company, Menatep, lobbied extensively and successfully to influence Western public opinion, retaining Margery Kraus of APCO who successfully pushed through resolutions inter alia before the US House of Representatives and the Council of Europe. According to a resolution of the Council of Europe,

"Intimidating action by different law-enforcement agencies against Yukos and its business partners and other institutions linked to Mr Khodorkovsky and his associates and the careful preparation of this action in terms of public relations, taken together, give a picture of a co-ordinated attack by the state."

This "raises serious issues pertaining to the principle of nullum crimen, nulla poena sine lege laid down in Article 7 of the ECHR and also to the right to the protection of property laid down in Article 1 of the Additional Protocol to the ECHR."

"The circumstances of the sale by auction of Yuganskneftegaz to "Baikal Finance Group" and the swift takeover of the latter by state-owned Rosneft raises additional issues related to the protection of property (ECHR, Additional Protocol, Article 1). This concerns both the circumstances of the auction itself, resulting in a price far below the fair market-value, and the way Yukos was forced to sell off its principal asset, by way of trumped-up tax reassessments leading to a total tax burden far exceeding that of Yukos's competitors, and for 2002 even exceeding Yukos’ total revenue for that year."

=== Forced sale of assets ===
In the Western media and the Russian opposition media the high-profile arrest of Khodorkovsky is usually attributed to his activism in the Russian political process.

On 31 October 2003, shortly after the arrest of the company's CEO, the Russian government froze ownership of 44% of the company's shares. The reason given was to prevent a group of shareholders led by Khodorkovsky from selling a large stake of the company to the US oil firm Exxon. A Yukos shareholders' meeting scheduled for 20 December 2004 was to discuss a "crisis plan." A Russian company must hold such a meeting before it can apply for bankruptcy in Russia. The Russian Government sold Yukos's main production unit, known as Yuganskneftegas, at auction on 19 December 2004 to recover some of US$28 billion in alleged tax debts, following the loss of an appeal by the firm. Menatep, the company representing Khodorkovsky, promised to challenge the sale's legality in a number of countries, and to sue the buyer and any company helping to fund the deal. The expected buyer was the 38% Russian state owned company OAO Gazprom. Some European and American oil firms decided not to bid.

On 19 December 2004, the Baikalfinansgrup, an unknown company registered several days before the auction in Tver at an address where a snack bar was located, won the auction for Yukos's subsidiary Yuganskneftegas with a 260.75 billion rubles ($9.4 billion) bid. According to people familiar with the auction only two bidders registered for, and were present during, the auction process: Baikalfinansgrup and Gazprom's former oil unit Gazpromneft. Accounts from the auction say that the first bid of US$8.6 billion came from Baikal. When the auctioneer asked Gazpromneft to offer its price, a representative of the company asked to make a telephone call and left the room. A few minutes earlier, the auctioneer had told participants that using a mobile phone or leaving the room was against the rules. When a Gazpromneft representative returned to the room, Baikal made a bid of US$9.3 billion. Gazpromneft never placed a bid or spoke out. Shortly after the Yuganskneftegaz auction, Rosneft, Russian state-owned oil company, acquired 100% of shares in Baikalfinansgrup. The acquisition of Yuganskneftegaz significantly increased Rosneft's profits and made it one of the largest oil companies in Russia.

=== Bankruptcy ===
On 15 June 2006, based on a bank deposit of US$4 million and its American CEO's Houston home, Yukos filed for bankruptcy protection in the United States, estimating its assets at US$12.3 billion and its debts at US$30.8 billion, including "alleged taxes owed to the Russian government". It accused the Russian authorities of "an unprecedented campaign of illegal, discriminatory, and disproportionate tax claims escalating into raids and confiscations, culminating in intimidation and arrests". After several weeks of deliberation, the Houston court declared that under no conceivable theory could Yukos assert domicile in the United States. On 25 July 2006, the creditors of Yukos decided to file for bankruptcy after the bankruptcy manager recommended the company be liquidated.

=== Management responses ===
At the time, key management included:

- CEO: Steven M. Theede
- CFO: Bruce K. Misamore
- Chairman of the board: Viktor Gerashchenko

By mid-December, 2004, all members of the board of Yukos, and most of the company's senior managers, had left Russia, some of them because of "fear of arrest" after being "summoned for questioning by prosecutors". According to a December 2004 Houston, Texas court filing, the CFO resides in Houston. According to a company spokeswoman the CEO resided in London, UK as of December 2004. Executives Mikhail Brudno and Vladimir Dubov fled to Israel in 2003, and were seen on 2 February 2005 in Washington, D.C. at an official function for President George W. Bush.

Both men were cited in an international arrest warrant regarding their involvement in the Yukos tax case. On Wednesday, 6 April 2006, the company's Executive Vice President, Vasily Aleksanyan, was arrested just six days into his new role. Yukos commented on its web site that, "We can only assume that this action against him is a direct result of his accepting a position to work to protect Yukos Oil Company and its legitimate stakeholders." The following month, it was reported that some individuals established themselves as the "New Management" of Yukos. However, this was apparently an illegal act, as Yukos "emphatically rejected" the legitimacy of the "new management" which had Vinokurov as president. According to Yukos, these individuals were "loyal to Rosneft" and had as goal the downfall of Yukos. A Yukos lawyer, Pavel Ivlev, was accused of several crimes, after which he moved to the USA. In July 2006, one week before creditors would vote if they should file for bankruptcy, Steven Theede resigned his function as he believed the outcome of this vote was already fixed and therefore this meeting would qualify as a "sham".

=== International legal proceedings of former Yukos shareholders vs. Russia ===
The Yukos Oil Company's former shareholders and management filed a series of claims in courts and arbitration panels in various countries, seeking compensation for their expropriation. The largest, for over $100 billion, was filed at the Permanent Court of Arbitration in 2007 and resulted in the arbitrators awarding Yukos majority shareholders over US$50 billion in damages. US and Russian investors, representing about 15 percent and 5 percent of Yukos, respectively, lack the benefit of an investment treaty. The sole remedy of US-based investors in seeking approximately $12 billion in redress is to request the State Department and the Office of the United States Trade Representative to espouse the claim to their Russian counterparts, as it is determined by the Magnitsky Act of 2012; State Department officials have reportedly raised Yukos investors' concerns at deputy prime minister level in the past.

The total final award in damages announced by the Permanent Court of Arbitration on 18 July 2014 was some $50 billion.

The European Court of Human Rights ruled for Russia to pay the former owners Yukos €1.87 billion ($2.51 billion) in compensation for unfair proceedings of the tax evasion case. Yukos is asking for $333 million to cover losses incurred after its accounts were frozen plus costs and interests.

On 20 April 2016 the District Court of The Hague set aside the decisions of the PCA, ruling that it had no jurisdiction as provisional application of the ECT arbitration clause violated Russian law. In February 2020, the Court of Appeal of the Hague reversed the invalidation and held that the PCA awards were valid.

== See also ==
- Eminent domain
- Oil price increases since 2003
- Hermitage Capital Management
- Alexey Pichugin
- Svetlana Bakhmina
- Petroleum industry in Russia
