= Didier Casimiro =

Russian government official

Vice President of Rosneft
- Incumbent
- Assumed office 23 May 2012

held top management positions at BP
- In office 1996–2012

Personal details
- Born: 1966 (age 59–60) Belgium
- Education: Ghent University (1991); Lisbon University (1992)

Didier Casimiro (born 1966) is the Former First Vice President of Rosneft, the Russian state oil company. Since 2020 and till May 2022, Chairman of the Board of Directors of Bashneft

In May 2022 resigned from Rosneft and all other related companies

== Career ==
Didier Casimiro graduated from Ghent University in 1991, and Lisbon University in 1992. Fluent in 7 languages, including Portuguese and French.

In 1996-2012, he worked at BP oil company in management positions. In his participation, in 2003, the branch of the BP company TNK-BP (Tyumen oil company - BP) was established in Moscow. The company soon became a one of leaders in the Russian oil market, with investments from the parent company. After that, in 2013, the company was sold in Rosneft.

Didier Casimiro was born in a Portuguese family. Thanks to his knowledge of the Portuguese language, he became especially close to Igor Sechin, who graduated from St. Petersburg University with a degree in Portuguese and worked as a military translator in Angola. Cashimiro learned the language from his parents, and Sechin mastered it during his service as a military translator in the communist Mozambique and Angola, where the Soviet Union had tremendous power during the civil wars of the two countries.

Took part in the expansion of Rosneft in Germany, Egypt, Latin America, the US and the UK.

=== Sanctions ===
The Trump administration expanded further sanctions on its Swiss-incorporated company (Rosneft Trading S.A.) and its president Casimiro on 18 February 2020 for supporting Venezuela's Nicolás Maduro regime by operating in the oil sector of the Venezuelan economy.

In July 2023, the USA government sanctions were lifted.
