= Scheherazade (yacht) =

Yacht, manufactured in 2020 by Lürssen

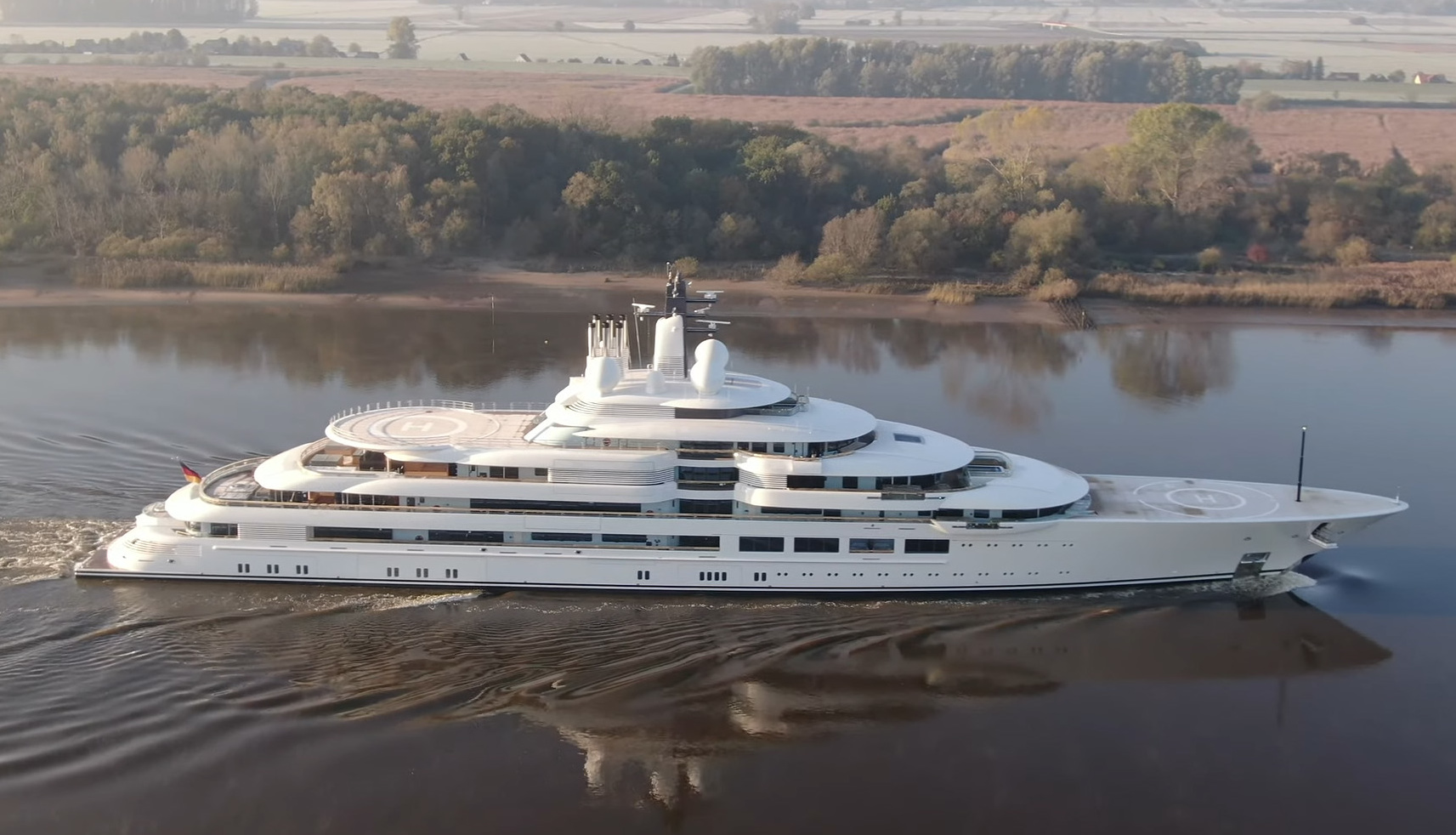
- Scheherazade on sea trials in 2019

History

Cayman Islands
- Name: Scheherazade
- Builder: Lürssen
- Launched: 5 July 2019
- In service: 1 June 2020
- Identification: IMO number: 9809980; MMSI number: 319179200; Callsign: ZGKI2

General characteristics
- Class & type: Motor yacht
- Tonnage: 10,167 GT
- Length: 140 m (460 ft)
- Beam: 23.3 m (76 ft)
- Draught: 5.1 m (17 ft)
- Propulsion: 2x 4,963hp MTU (20V 4000 M73L) diesel engines
- Speed: 19.5 knots (36 km/h) (maximum); 16.2 knots (30 km/h) (cruising)
- Capacity: 40
- Crew: 92

Scheherazade is a motor superyacht built by Lürssen Yachts of Germany. With a length of 140 m (460 ft), it is currently one of the longest motor yachts in the world.

While being built, it used the project name "Lightning". The exterior design was done by the designer Espen Oeino, and the interiors by the firm of Francois Zuretti. It entered service in June 2020. As of early May 2022 the yacht has been seized by Italian authorities due to its possible links to Russian President Vladimir Putin and subject to sanctions relating to the Russo-Ukrainian War.

== Engineering and construction ==
The yacht has a steel hull with an aluminum superstructure. It was launched on 5 July 2019, and undertook sea trials the following month. It was delivered on 1 June 2020, departing Lemwerder for Norway. According to SuperYachtFan, in 2022 it has an estimated value of US$700 million. The New York Times reported that it appeared to be the sister ship of the 135.5 m (445 ft) Crescent, owned by Igor Sechin, a Russian oligarch and CEO of Rosneft.

== Features ==
The yacht has two helicopter decks, a gym, and gold-plated bathroom fixtures. The yacht comprises six levels. The main deck contains six guest cabins, a grand dining room, and a spa, which includes a hammam, a sauna, a cryotherapy chamber, and a hydro massage room. The upper deck contains two VIP suites, one of which includes a player piano. The owner's deck has his-and-hers suites with separate bathrooms, walk-in closets, studies, and dressing rooms. There are a total of 22 cabins capable of accommodating 40 guests, and a total crew of 94.

There are however no outdoor swimming pools, otherwise common on yachts of this size, which were said to have been excluded for "privacy reasons, though it does have an indoor swimming pool with a retractable floor that can be used as a dance floor.

== Ownership and use ==
The yacht's owner is not publicly known. Like Crescent, it is managed by Imperial Yachts of Monaco.

The yacht sailed to Sochi, Russia, in summer 2020, then to Hurghada, Egypt in September 2020. The yacht again sailed to Sochi in July 2021. Since September 2021, it has been docked at the port of Marina di Carrara in Tuscany.

In 2022 Russian opposition activists published an alleged crew list, showing that all crew members, but the captain, were Russian citizens. Furthermore at least 10 were identified as Federal Protective Service officers, a service tasked with protecting the Russian president and other high ranking government officials.

== Investigation for sanctions ==
While Scheherazade was undergoing a refit in Italy, it had also been under investigation by Italian and American authorities to determine if the superyacht's secretive owner is subject to sanctions being imposed on Russian oligarchs close to Russian President Vladimir Putin, due to the Russo-Ukrainian War. In May 2022, the US Department of Justice indicated that Eduard Khudaynatov was the proxy owner of Scheherazade, the assumed owner being Putin. In May 2022 the ship left the shipyard and was ready to leave the port of Marina di Carrara. The ship was seized on 6 May 2022 based on its links to the Russian government.

== See also ==
- List of motor yachts by length
