= East-Prinovozemelsky field =

Oil and gas field in the Kara Sea

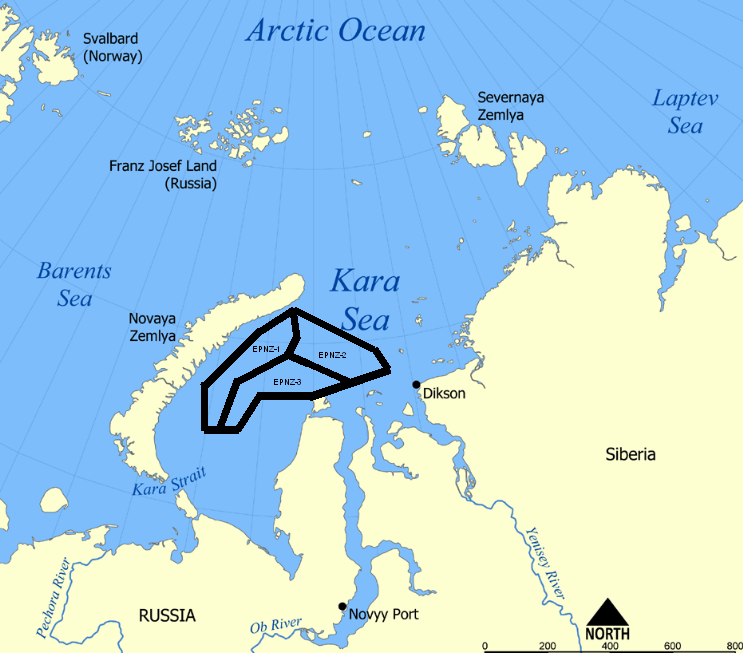
- Location of the East-Prinovozemelsky blocks
- Country: Russia
- Location: Kara Sea
- Offshore/onshore: offshore
- Coordinates: 74°N 67°E
- Operator: Rosneft
- Partners: Rosneft; ExxonMobil

Production
- Estimated oil in place: 35,800 million barrels (~4.88×10^{9} t)
- Estimated gas in place: 10,200×10^{9} m^{3} (360×10^{12} cu ft)

The East-Prinovozemelsky field (also referred as Vostochno-Prinovozemelskoye structure – meaning: East of Novaya Zemlya structure) is a gigantic undeveloped Arctic oil and gas field located in the South Kara basin of the continental shelf of Russia, in the South Kara Sea between the Yamal Peninsula and Novaya Zemlya island. It is the continuation of the continental West Siberian hydrocarbon province.

== History ==
The field is divided into three license blocks: EPNZ-1, EPNZ2, and ENPZ-3. In October 2010, licenses for all three blocks were awarded to Russian oil company Rosneft. In January 2011, Rosneft announced that it will form a strategic alliance with BP to develop the East-Prinovozemelsky oil and gas field. For the development activities, a joint operating company was to be created in which Rosneft would have 66.67% and BP would have 33.33% of shares. Initial stages of exploration activities would to be financed by BP.

The deal was blocked by BP's subsidiary TNK-BP, a joint venture with a group of Russian billionaires, known as AAR (Alfa-Access-Renova), due to a dispute over Russian exploration rights between the two companies, and was nullified.

=== Rosneft–ExxonMobil joint venture ===
On 30 August 2011, Rosneft announced that instead of BP the partner for EPNZ-1, EPNZ-2 and EPNZ-3 will be ExxonMobil. The two companies agreed to invest US$3.2 billion in a joint venture to develop the three East-Prinovozemelsky blocks, as well as a field offshore of Tuapse. Under the terms of the contract, Rosneft will own two-thirds of the joint venture, with Exxon controlling the remainder. The first oil produced from the fields was expected to be drilled in 2015, with ExxonMobil at least initially paying for most construction costs. Total investment to the East-Prinovozemelsky blocks, according to Russian Prime Minister Vladimir Putin, could possibly reach as high as $500 billion, though ExxonMobil's officials said that in the near term, it is likely that investments will reach only tens of billions of dollars.

After Russia annexed Crimea in 2014, the US imposed sanctions that blocked the partnership, and after ExxonMobil received a brief exemption in order to safely complete drilling a well it withdrew from East-Prinovozemelsky. ExxonMobil was later granted a limited waiver to maintain "administrative actions" in the joint venture, and in March 2017 applied to the US government for a full waiver that would allow it to resume drilling in partnership with Rosneft. The request was denied in April, though the decision was not immediately fatal for the venture, as under the terms of the agreement ExxonMobil has until 2023 to begin operations in the field.

== Reserves ==
The South Kara Sea hydrocarbons basin lies on the same geological trend with the Western Siberian hydrocarbon province. The East-Prinovozemelsky area covers 125,000 square kilometres (48,000 sq mi). According to Rosneft, the estimated oil in place is 35.8 billion barrels (5.69×10^{9} m^{3}) and the estimated natural gas in place is 10.32 trillion cubic metres (364 trillion cubic feet). Of this 21.7 billion barrels (3.45×10^{9} m^{3}) of oil and 2.4 trillion cubic metres (85 trillion cubic feet) of gas lies in EPNZ-1 block, 12.5 billion barrels (1.99×10^{9} m^{3}) of oil and 2.2 trillion cubic metres (78 trillion cubic feet) of gas in EPNZ-2, and 1.6 billion barrels (250×10^{6} m^{3}) of oil and 5.7 trillion cubic metres (200 trillion cubic feet) of gas in EPNZ-3.

== See also ==
- Petroleum industry in Russia
