= South Kara Depression =

Depression in the Arctic shelf of Russia

- Depression
- Location: Nenets Autonomous Okrug, Russia

The South Kara Depression is the central part of the South Kara Basin of the Arctic shelf of Russia. It is covered with up to 12 km thick of Neogene-Quaternary deposits.
