= Eduard Khudaynatov =

Khazak-Russian businessman and politician

Eduard Yurievich Khudaynatov
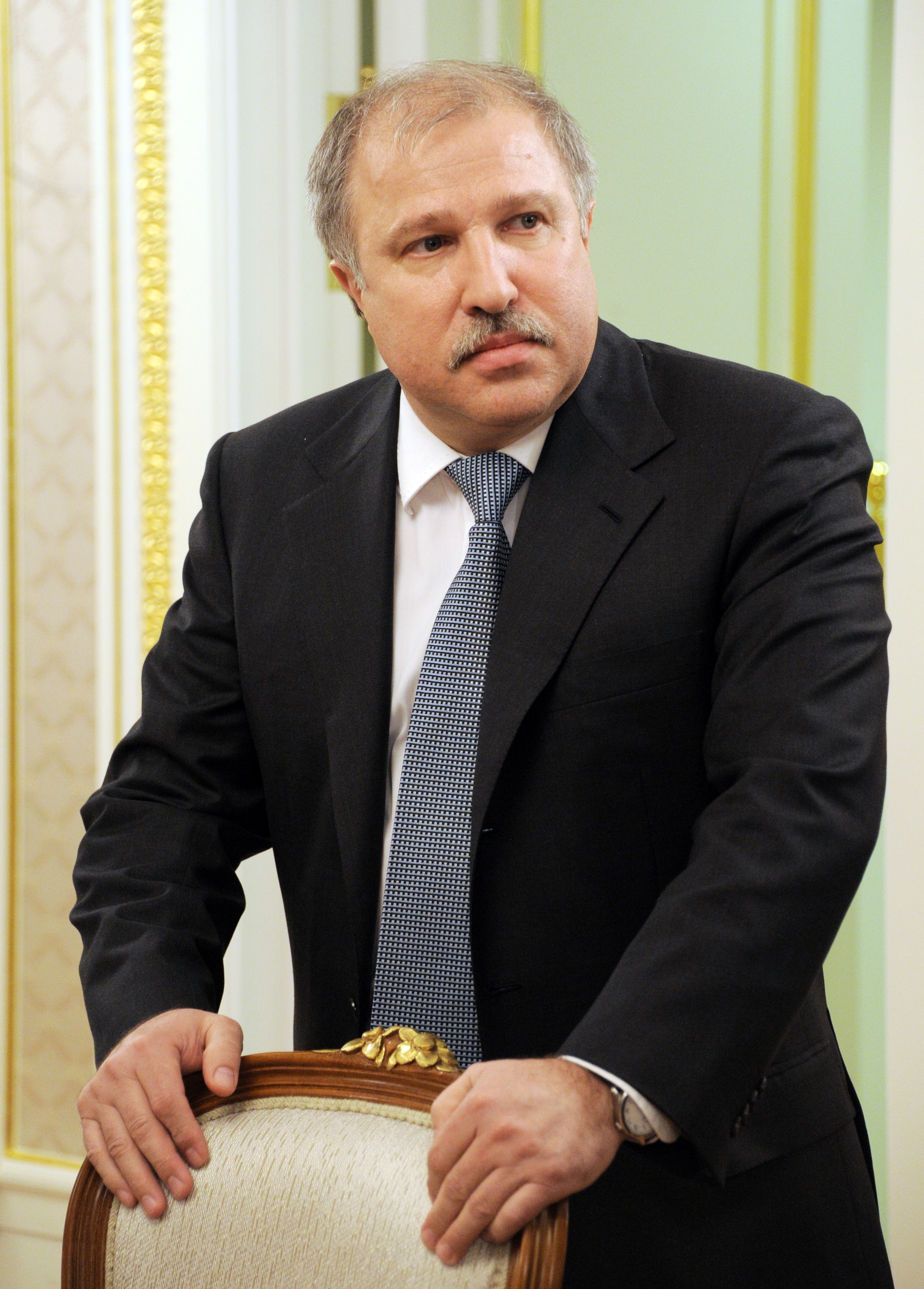
- Born: September 11, 1960 (age 65); Shymkent, Kazak SSR
- Occupation: Entrepreneur

Eduard Yurievich Khudaynatov (born September 11, 1960, Shymkent, Kazak SSR) is an entrepreneur and the owner of JSC Independent Oil and Gas Company.

== Early life and education ==
Khudaynatov was born on September 11, 1960, in Shymkent. In 1996, he graduated from the International Academy of Entrepreneurship.

== Career ==
Khudaynatov served his mandatory military service in naval border guard units from 1978 until 1981. He was demobilized with the rank of chief petty officer.

In 1981, he moved to Nefteyugansk, where he worked for Yuganskneftegaz as a drilling rig installer.

In 1985, Khudaynatov moved to Surgut. He worked for a department of the Ministry of Oil and Gas Construction, rising from cargo handler to foreman in the Surgut management office.

In 1989, he founded and headed the meat and dairy products company Bacon in Nefteyugansk.

From 1993 to 1996, Khudaynatov was the head of Evikhon, which developed oil and gas fields in Khanty-Mansi Autonomous Okrug, Evikhon-2, supplying scarce imported goods to northern territories, and the trading enterprise Yuganskpromfinko.

He became the head of the Nefteyugansk branch of the Reforms-New Course movement and First Deputy Head of the Nefteyugansk District administration in 1996.

From 1996 to 2000, Khudaynatov was head of the Poikovsky village administration. He led the restoration work in the settlement. The road network was reconstructed, residential properties were renovated, utilities were installed, a church was built, and a children’s yacht club was opened.

He served as Deputy of the Tyumen Regional Duma from 1997 to 2001.

From 2000 to 2003, Khudaynatov worked as Federal inspector of the Office of the Plenipotentiary Representative of the President in the Northwestern Federal District for the Nenets Autonomous Okrug.

He then became Director of Severneftegazprom, a subsidiary of PJSC Gazprom. He contributed to the launch of the Yuzhno-Russkoye Field with production of 25 billion m^{3} per year. He worked in this role from 2003 to 2008

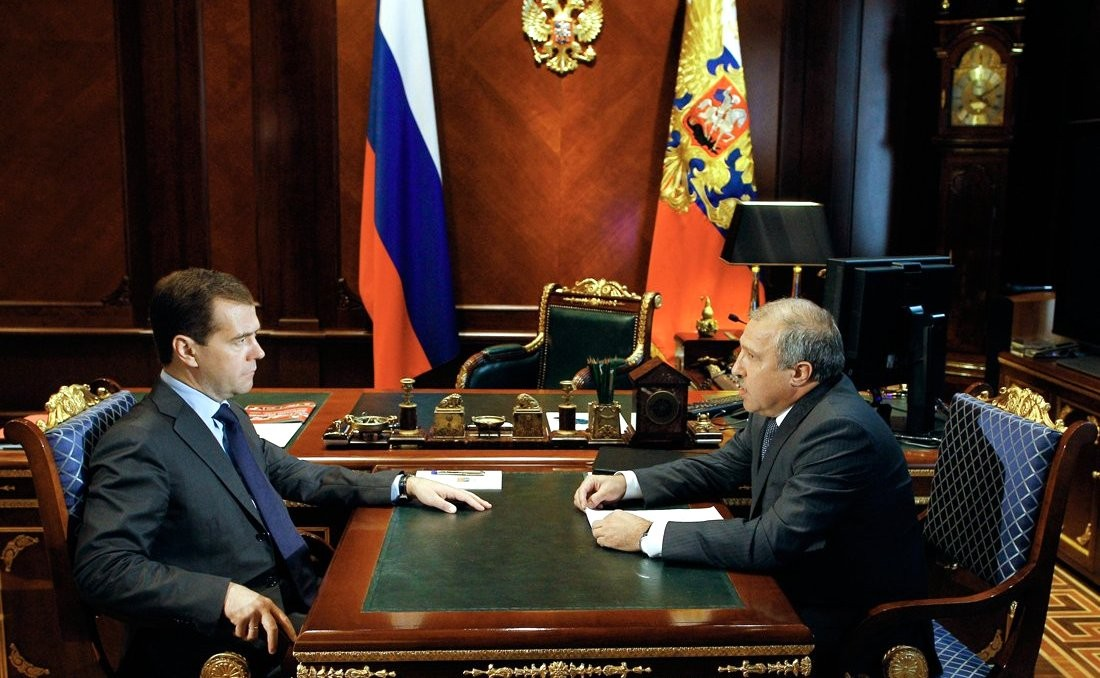
With Dmitry Medvedev, 21 July 2011

From 2008 to 2013, Khudaynatov worked as Vice President, President, and Deputy Chairman of the Management Board of OJSC NK Rosneft. Under the leadership of Eduard Khudaynatov, the Vankor group of fields was put into commercial operation in 2009.

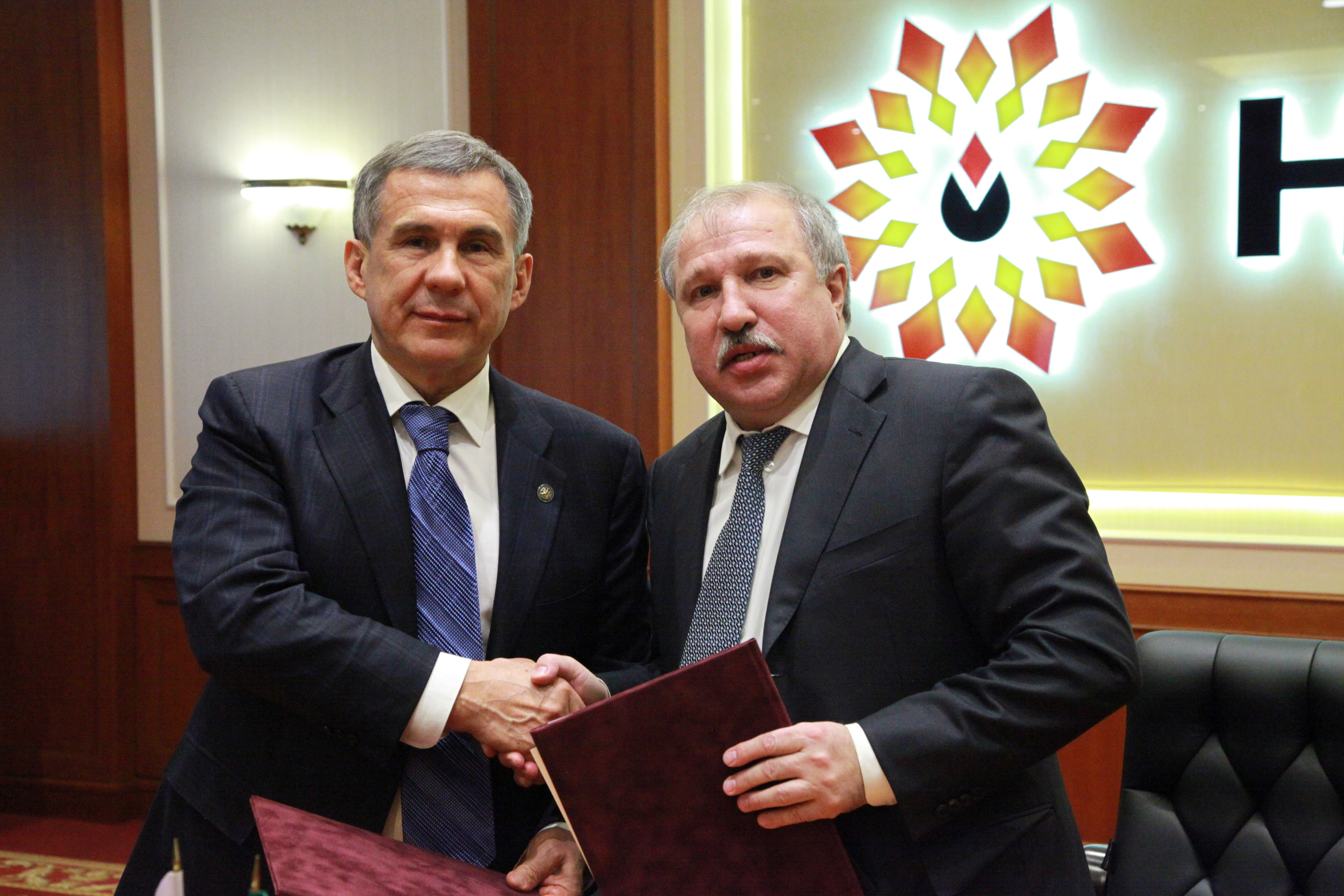
With Rustam Minnikhanov, 12 March 2015

In 2013, he founded and headed Independent Oil and Gas Company. He developed a strategy whereby the company sought and acquired promising assets engaged in geological exploration and mining. By 2016, the company owned 53 subsoil use licenses in 8 regions of the Russian Federation and in Kazakhstan.

== Superyacht ownership ==
After the start of the Russo-Ukrainian War, sanctions were imposed on Russian property abroad. As part of these, the ownership of Russian oligarchs' superyachts was investigated. In May 2022, the US Department of Justice indicated that Khudaynatov was the proxy owner of two megayachts, Scheherazade (assumed owner Vladimir Putin) and Amadea (assumed owner Suleyman Kerimov). Further investigations also found him to be the straw owner of Crescent (assumed owner Igor Sechin).

== Recognition ==
- Medal of the Order "For Merit to the Fatherland", 2nd class (2000)
- Laureate of the All-Russian Financiers’ Award "Reputation” in 2011 in the "For contributions to improving the financial transparency of a Russian publicly listed company" category
- Order "For Merit to the Fatherland", 4th class (2012)
- Order "For Merit to the Fatherland", 3rd class (2019)
- Order of Honour
- Title "Honorary Oil Worker"
- State Councilor of the Russian Federation, 2nd and 3rd classes
