= Verkhnechonsk field =

Oil field in Siberia, Russia

Verkhnechonskoye field
- Country: Russia
- Region: Eastern Siberia
- Location: Kataganskiy district, Irkutsk Oblast
- Offshore/onshore: onshore
- Operator: Verkhnechonskneftegaz
- Partners: TNK-BP (68.51%); Rosneft (25.94%); East Siberian Gas Co. (5.48%)

Field history
- Discovery: 1978
- Start of development: 2002
- Start of production: 2008

Production
- Current production of oil: 23,500 barrels per day (~1.17×10^{6} t/a)
- Year of current production of oil: 2009
- Estimated oil in place: 1,886 million barrels (~2.573×10^{8} t)
- Estimated gas in place: 95.5×10^{9} m^{3} (3.37×10^{12} cu ft)
- Producing formations: Precambrian formations

The Verkhnechonskoye field is a giant oil field in Eastern Siberia, Russia. The field is located in Kataganskiy district, Irkutsk Oblast, about 1,100 kilometres (680 mi) north-east from Irkutsk. It is considered the largest oil field in Eastern Siberia.

The field was discovered in 1978 and development started in 2002. Pilot operation of the field was started in 2005 and on 15 October 2008, first oil produced at the Verkhnechonskoye field was delivered. As of 2007, total proved reserves of Verkhnechonskoye were 409 million barrels (65.0×10^{6} m^{3}) of oil equivalent, and proved, possible and probable (3P) reserves amounted to 1.886 billion barrels (299.9×10^{6} m^{3}). Natural gas reserves are 95.5 billion cubic meters. In 2009, the field produced through 41 oil wells 1.181 million tons of oil, equal to 23,500 barrels per day (3,740 m^{3}/d). The field is operated by Verkhnechonskneftegaz, a joint venture of TNK-BP (68.51%), Rosneft (25.94%), and East Siberian Gas Co. (5.48%).

Produced oil is shipped by an 85-kilometre (53 mi) pipeline to Surgutneftegaz' Talakan field where it supplied to the Eastern Siberia – Pacific Ocean oil pipeline.

== See also ==
- Petroleum industry in Russia
