= Crescent (yacht) =

Yacht, manufactured in 2018 by Lürssen

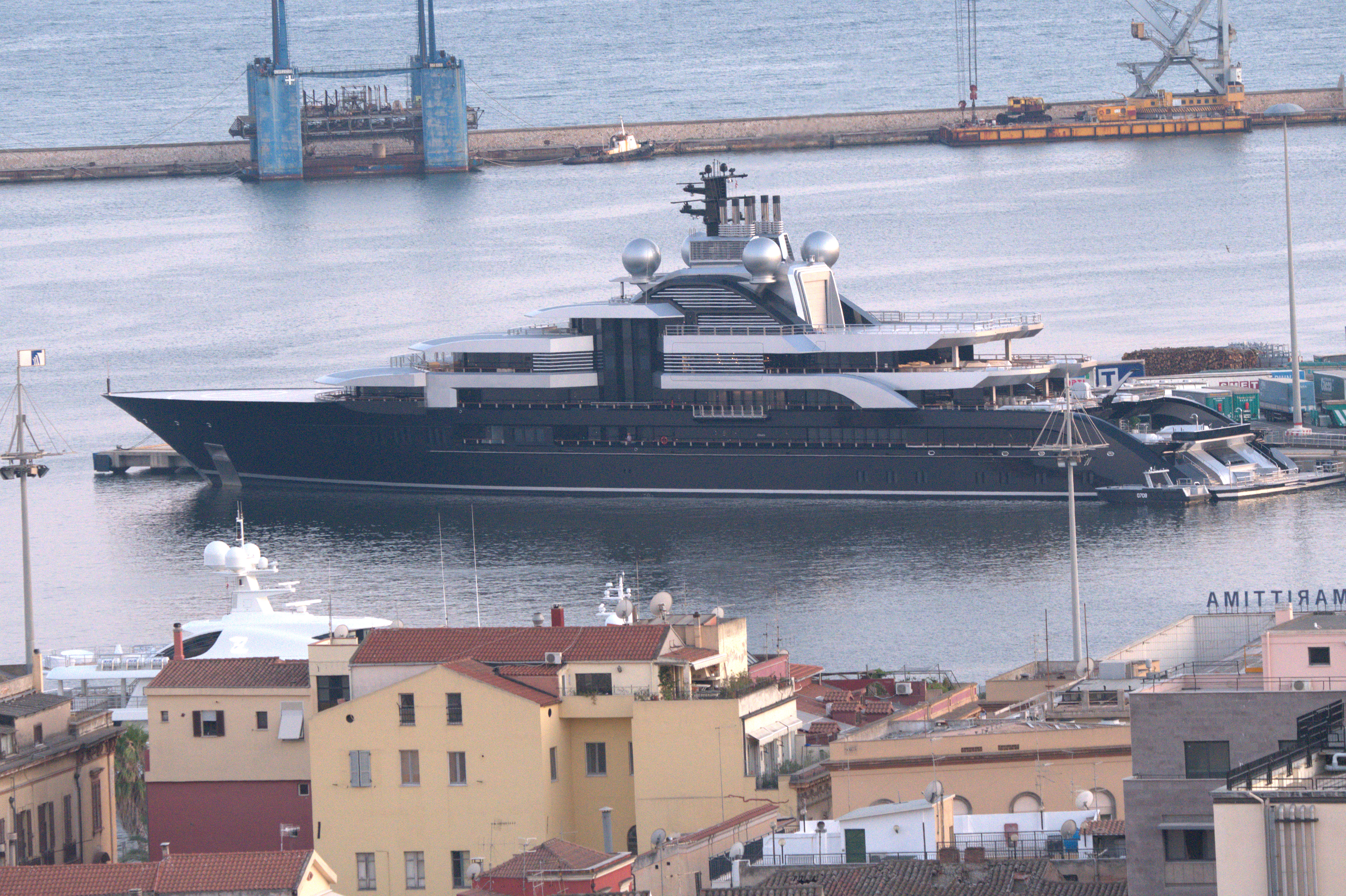

History

Cayman Islands
- Name: Crescent
- Builder: Lürssen
- Launched: 3 April 2017
- In service: 2018
- Identification: IMO number: 9785108; MMSI number: 319136700; Callsign: ZGHT9

General characteristics
- Class & type: Motor yacht
- Tonnage: 9,034 GT
- Length: 135.61 m (444.9 ft)
- Beam: 21 m (69 ft)
- Draught: 5.20 m (17.1 ft)
- Propulsion: 2x 4,963hp MTU (20V 4000 M73L) diesel engines
- Speed: 20 knots (37 km/h) (maximum); 11 knots (20 km/h) (cruising)
- Capacity: 36 passengers
- Crew: 59

The 135.61 m (444.9 ft) superyacht Crescent was launched by Lürssen at their yard near Rendsburg. The yacht's exterior design is from Espen Øino (Oeino) and Zuretti Design was responsible for the interior design. She is owned by Caymanese company Black Dragon Minerals LLS. In March 2022, she was detained by Spain as property of Rosneft CEO Igor Sechin, who is sanctioned in connection with 2022 Russian invasion of Ukraine.

== Design ==
Her length is 135.61 m (444.9 ft), beam is 21 m (69 ft) and she has a draught of 5.20 m (17.1 ft). The hull is built out of steel while the superstructure is made out of aluminium with teak laid decks. The yacht is classed by Lloyd's Register and flagged in the Cayman Islands.

=== Amenities ===
Zero speed stabilizers, gym, elevator, swimming pool, movie theatre, tender garage, swimming platform, air conditioning, BBQ, beach club, spa room, underwater lights, beauty salon. There are also two helicopter landing pads, one is on the bow while the other one is located on the top deck. The one on the top deck can be covered by a hangar that is built into the main mast.

=== Performance ===
Propulsion is supplied by twin 7,512 hp MTU (20V 1163 M84) diesel engines. The engines drive two propellers, which in turn propel the ship to a top speed of 15 knots (28 km/h). At a cruising speed of 11 knots (20 km/h), her maximum range is 7,000 nmi (13,000 km).

== See also ==
- Scheherazade (yacht)
- List of motor yachts by length
- List of yachts built by Lürssen
