= North Kara basin =

Sedimentary basin in Russia

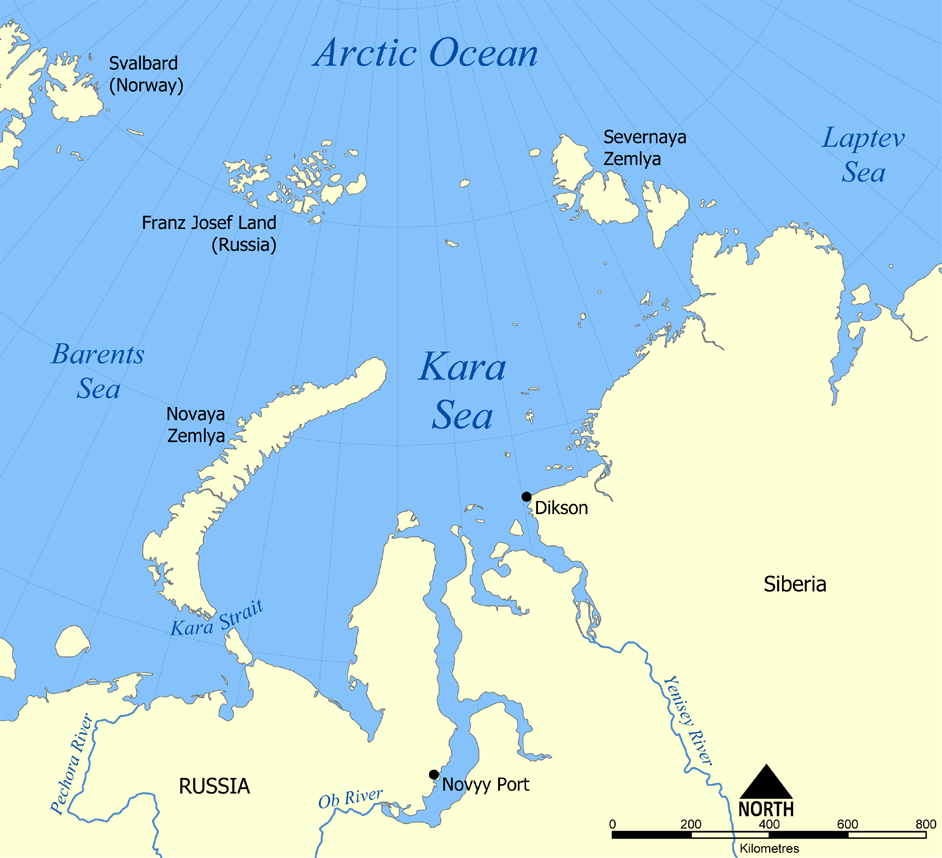
Kara Sea

The North Kara basin is a sedimentary basin, a part of the Arctic shelf of Russia, associated with the Kara Sea. It is separated from the South Kara basin by the North Siberian sill (along Novaya Zemlya-Taimyr Peninsula). From the North it is bounded by the Urvantsev Trough identified in 2012.
