= South Kara basin =

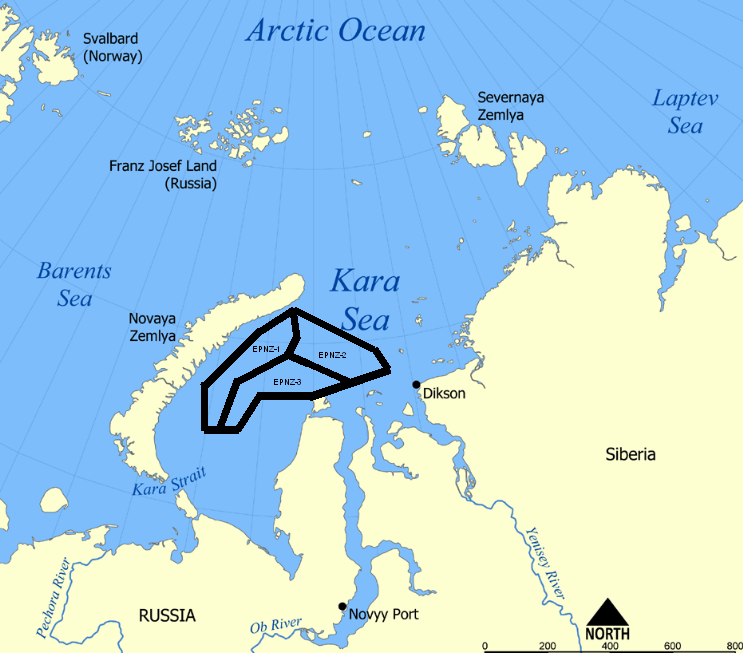
East-Prinovozemelsky oil and gas field

The South Kara basin is part of the Arctic shelf of Russia, associated with the Kara Sea. It is covered with Permian-Quaternary deposits over 10 km thick. It is the northern, lowest part of the West Siberian midland plate and separated from the North Kara basin by the North Siberian sill (along Novaya Zemlya-Taimyr Peninsula). It is bounded by the Pai-Khoi Range and Novaya Zemlya from the West and by Taimyr folds in the South-East.

The basin includes the East-Prinovozemelsky field divided into three license blocks, a gigantic undeveloped Arctic oil and gas field, awarded to Rosneft in 2021.
