= Amadea (yacht) =

Yacht, manufactured by Lürssen

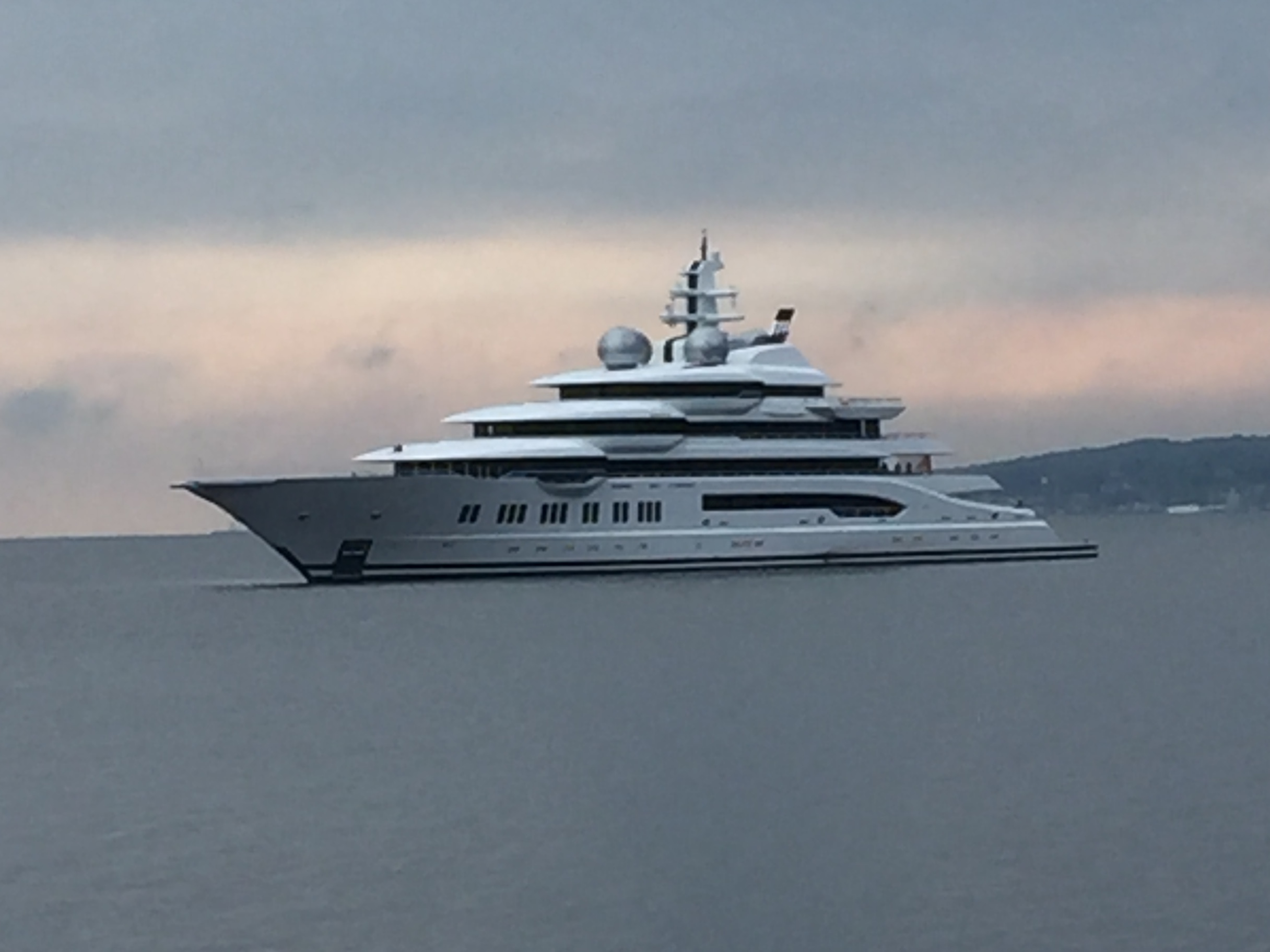

History

Cayman Islands
- Name: Amadea
- Owner: Abbas Sajwani
- Builder: Lürssen
- Launched: 2016
- Completed: 2017
- In service: 2017
- Identification: IMO number: 1012531; MMSI number: 319112900; Callsign: ZGVH3
- Status: In service; acquired via auction in 2025

General characteristics
- Class & type: Motor yacht
- Tonnage: 4,402 GT
- Length: 106.1 m (348 ft 1 in)
- Beam: 17.86 m (58 ft 7 in)
- Draught: 4.1 m (13 ft 5 in)
- Propulsion: 2 × 5,766 hp (4,300 kW) MTU (20V 4000 M93L) diesel engines
- Speed: 20 knots (37 km/h) (maximum)
- Capacity: 16 passengers
- Crew: 36
- Notes: Range 8,000 nmi (15,000 km; 9,200 mi) at 13 knots (24 km/h; 15 mph)

The superyacht Amadea was delivered in 2017 by Lürssen of Germany. Since 2025, it has been owned by Emirati real estate developer Abbas Sajwani.

== Design ==
The yacht's exterior design is from Espen Øino (Oeino) while Zuretti Design was responsible for the interior design. The length is 106.1 m (348 ft 1 in), beam is 17.86 m (58 ft 7 in) and draught is 4.1 m (13 ft 5 in). The hull is built out of steel with a superstructure made out of aluminium with five decks. The yacht is flagged in the Cayman Islands.

=== Amenities ===
The ship has many amenities: zero speed stabilizers, gym, elevator, 10 m (33 ft) infinity pool, movie theatre, tender garage, swimming platform, air conditioning, BBQ, beach club, spa room, jacuzzi, beauty salon. There is also one helicopter landing pad. On the main deck, the interior holds a hand-painted Pleyel piano inlaid with 24-karat gold. Art deco decorations were created in cooperation with Willem Lenssinck who also designed the five-ton Albatross figure at the bow.

=== Performance ===
Propulsion is supplied by twin 7,512 hp MTU (20V 1163 M84) diesel engines. The engines drive two propellers, which in turn propel the ship to a top speed of 20 knots (37 km/h). At a cruising speed of 13 knots (24 km/h), her maximum range is 8,000 nmi (15,000 km).

== Ownership ==
Amadea was formerly owned by Suleyman Kerimov. In 2022, it was seized by the US government in Fiji and brought to the United States. Following a forfeiture order, the vessel was auctioned off on September 10, 2025, in a sealed-bid auction conducted by the U.S. Marshals Service.

The winner of the auction was Beyond Holdings Group (formerly AHS Four Company), a firm controlled by Emirati real estate developer Abbas Sajwani. Prior to the sale, the Russian oligarch Eduard Khudaynatov contested the auction, but a U.S. federal judge rejected his ownership claims in 2025, clearing the way for the title transfer to the Sajwani family.

== See also ==
- List of motor yachts by length
- List of yachts built by Lürssen
