= Tuapse field =

Offshore oil field in Black Sea

- Country: Russia
- Location: Black Sea
- Offshore/onshore: offshore
- Operator: Rosneft
- Partners: Rosneft; ExxonMobil

Production
- Estimated oil in place: 7,200 million barrels (~9.8×10^{8} t)

The Tuapse field is a large offshore oil field located in the Black Sea, roughly 11,000 square kilometres (4,300 mi^{2}) in size and between 1,000 and 2,000 metres (3,300 and 6,600 ft) underwater, containing between 2.2 and 7.2 billion barrels (350×10^{6} and 1,140×10^{6} m^{3}) of oil.

== History ==
In August 2003, Rosneft was awarded a license to explore the field, allowing the company to carry out surveys and small-scale exploratory drilling.

In February 2011, Rosneft and ExxonMobil reached a preliminary agreement to develop the field; the agreement was officially announced on 30 August 2011 as part of a US$3.2 billion joint venture between the two companies that also included the development of the East-Prinovozemelsky field in the Arctic Kara Sea. Under the terms of the contract, Rosneft will own two-thirds of the joint venture, with Exxon controlling the remainder.

After Russia annexed Crimea in 2014, the US imposed sanctions that blocked the partnership. ExxonMobil was later granted a limited waiver to maintain "administrative actions" in the joint venture, and in March 2017 applied to the US government for a full waiver that would allow it to resume drilling in partnership with Rosneft. The request was denied in April, leaving ExxonMobil with little chance of beginning drilling before the joint venture agreement expired at the end of the year.

== See also ==
- Petroleum industry in Russia
