= Igor Sechin =

Russian oligarch (born 1960)

- Игорь Сечин
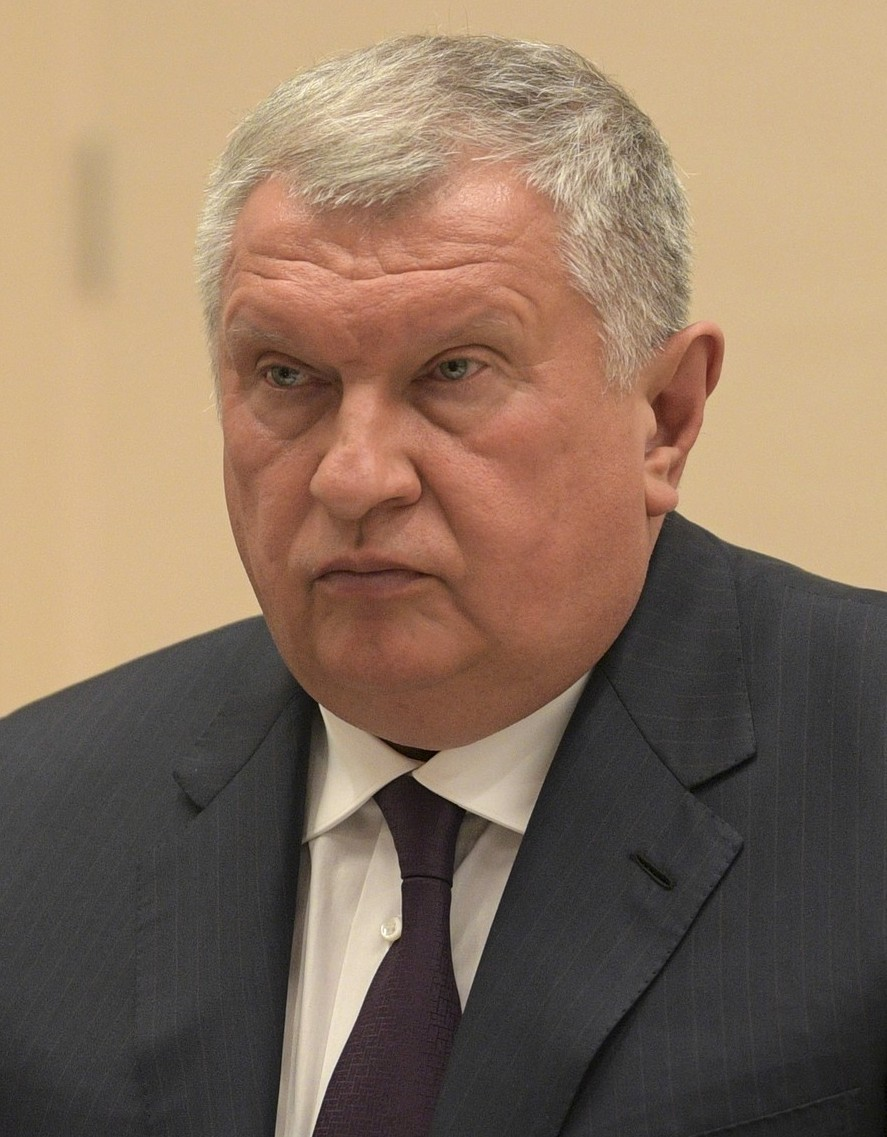
- Sechin in 2020

Chief Executive Officer of Rosneft
- Incumbent
- Assumed role 23 May 2012
- Preceded by: Eduard Khudaynatov

Deputy Prime Minister of Russia
- In office 12 May 2008 – 21 May 2012

Personal details
- Born: Igor Ivanovich Sechin; 7 September 1960 (age 66) Leningrad, Russian SFSR, Soviet Union (now Saint Petersburg, Russia)
- Spouse(s): Marina Sechina (div. 2011) Olga Rozhkova (m. 2012; div. 2017)
- Children: 3
- Salary: ~$17,500,000 (2014)

Igor Ivanovich Sechin (Russian: Игорь Иванович Сечин; born 7 September 1960) is a Russian entrepreneur and government official, considered a close ally and "de facto deputy" of Vladimir Putin. He is the Chief Executive Officer (CEO) of Rosneft.

Sechin has been a confidant of Russian leader Vladimir Putin since the early 1990s. Sechin was chief of staff to Putin when he was the deputy mayor of St. Petersburg in 1994. When Putin became President in 2000, Sechin became his deputy chief of staff, overseeing security services and energy issues in Russia. Putin appointed Sechin as chairman of Rosneft, the Russian state oil company in 2004. He was Deputy Prime Minister of Russia in Vladimir Putin's cabinet from 2008 to 2012. He is currently the chief executive officer, president and chairman of the management board of Rosneft. In late 2024, it was announced Sechin would remain head of Rosneft for at least another five years.

Sechin is often described as one of Putin's most conservative counselors and the leader of the Kremlin's Siloviki faction, a lobby gathering former security services agents. (Note: Other siloviki close to Sechin include Nikolai Patrushev, Alexander Bortnikov, and Viktor Ivanov.) He has been sanctioned by some foreign governments following the Russian invasion of Ukraine.

== Career ==
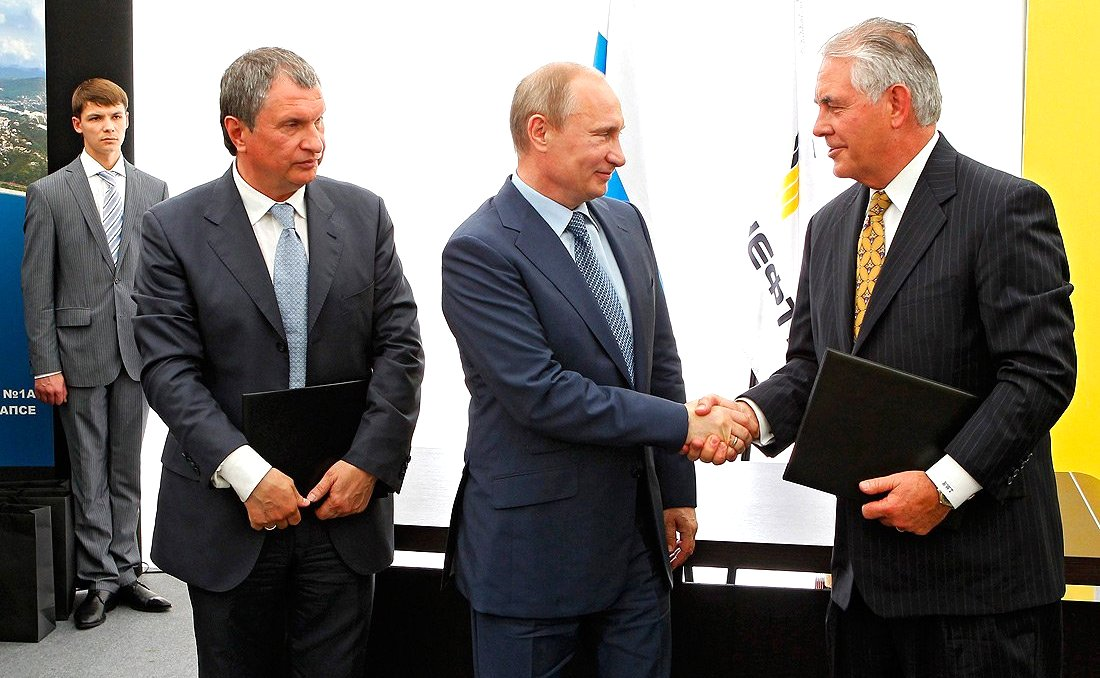
Sechin with Russian President Vladimir Putin and ExxonMobil CEO Rex Tillerson, 15 June 2012

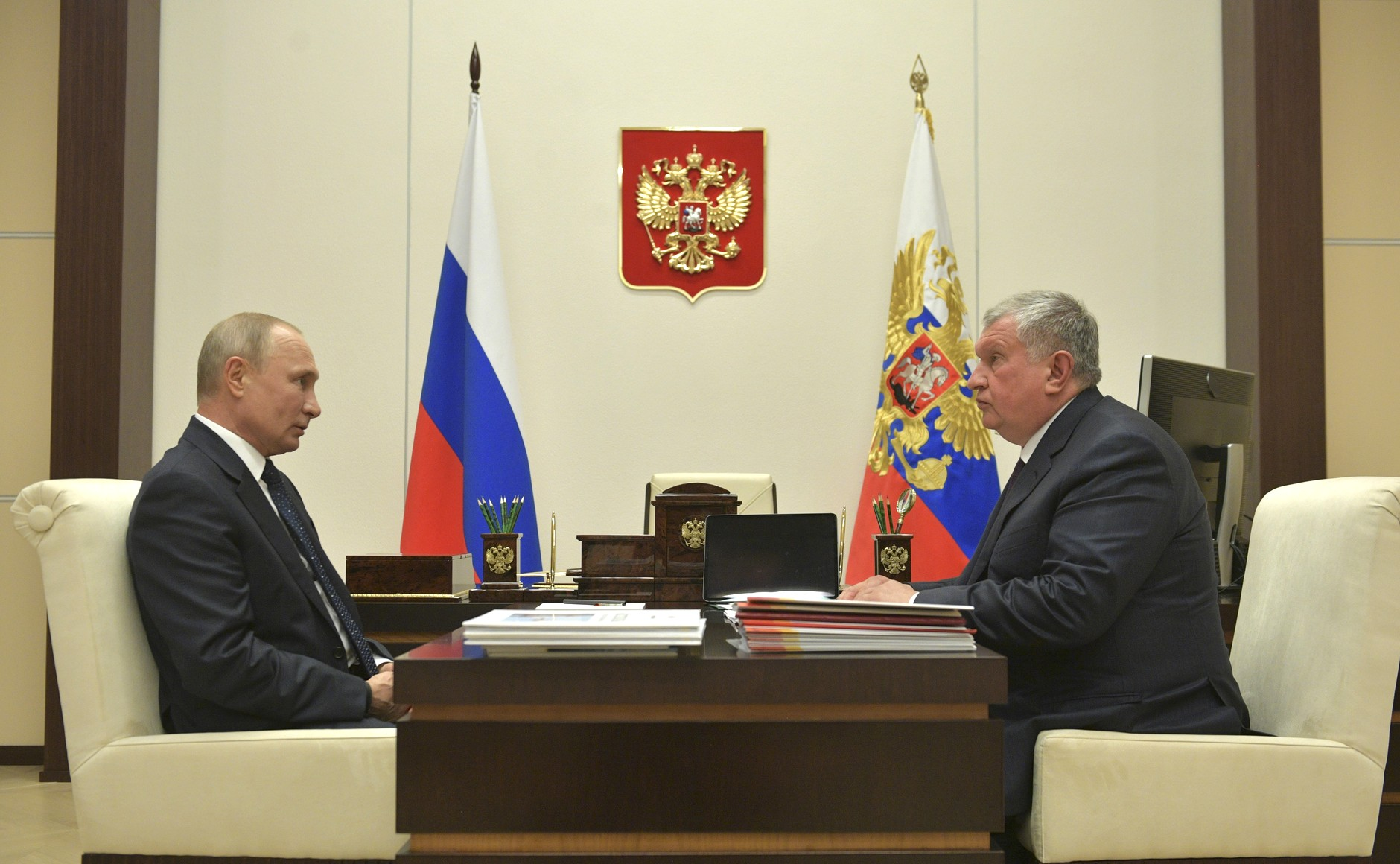
Sechin with Russian President Putin, 12 May 2020

Sechin graduated from Leningrad State University in 1984 as a linguist, fluent in Portuguese and French. In the 1980s, Sechin worked in Mozambique. He was officially a Soviet interpreter. From 1991 to 1996, he worked at Saint Petersburg mayor's office, and became a chief of staff of the first deputy mayor, Vladimir Putin in 1994. From 1996 to 1997, Sechin served as a deputy of Vladimir Putin, who worked in the presidential property management department. From 1997 to 1998, Sechin was the chief of the general department of the main control directorate attached to the president, led by Putin. In August 1999, he was appointed head of the secretariat of the prime minister of Russia, Putin. From 24 November 1999 until 11 January 2000, Sechin was the first deputy chief of the Russian presidential administration.

Between 31 December 1999 and May 2008, he was deputy chief of Putin's administration. (Note: Oleg Vladimirovich Feoktistov (Russian: Олег Владимирович Феоктистов; born 3 July 1964, Moscow Oblast), also known as "Oleg the Big" or "General Fix" or "General Ficus", served as a border guard in Karelia with Ivan Ivanovich Tkachev (Russian: Иван Иванович Ткачёв; born 1970), who later would head the "K" Directorate of the SEB of the FSB beginning in 2016 after the resignation of Viktor Voronin (Russian: Виктор Воронин), and fought with the Soviet Army during the Soviet–Afghan War where he met the KGB military counterintelligence officer Sergei Shishin (Russian: Сергей Шишин), who later became the head of the special forces of the FSB CSS, and then the head of the FSB Economic Support Service. Shishin guided Feoktistov but became embroiled in scandals during 2007 after which Shishin transferred to the Office of seconded employees, then seconded to VTB Bank, and three years later he joined the management of RusHydro and the Igor Sechin associated Rosneft. Feoktistov graduated from the FSB Academy and, in 2004, headed the newly formed FSB's Internal Security Directorate also known as the 6th Service or CSS (Russian: «Шестерка») of the FSB, which is responsible for the operational support of criminal cases and The New Times called "Sechin's Special Forces" because it was created on an initiative of Igor Sechin while Igor Sechin was the deputy head of the presidential administration. Declassified in 2017, Feoktistov stood at the origins of the creation of the 6th Service of the CSS of the FSB, which is nicknamed the "Sechin special forces", led almost all high-profile arrests of governors and mayors. In September 2016, Feoktistov officially became the head of the security service of Rosneft. FSB CSS, Colonel-General Oleg Feoktistov, seconded in October 2017 as an adviser to Peresvet Bank (Russian: банку «Пересвет»), which had the Russian Orthodox Church as the main shareholder, but receiving rehabilitation by the Rosneft owned All-Russian Bank for Regional Development (Russian: Всероссийский банк развития регионов). Igor Sechin sent his confidant Feoktistov to control the situation and exorcise demons in the Russian Orthodox Church: Feoktistov was nicknamed "the head of the CSS of the Russian Orthodox Church.") (Note: As of 2024, Boris Antonovich Boyarskov (Russian: Борис Антонович Боярсков; born 9 July 1953, Leningrad) is allegedly a retired KGB general, is very close to Igor Sechin of Rosneft but was often at odds with Mikhail Lesin and Mikhail Seslavinsky while Seslavinsky was at Rospechat (Russian: Роспечать). From 1994 until 1999, Boyarskov headed the security at the Sergey Rodionov associated bank Imperial after which he was considered for head of security of the Central Bank of Russia but instead worked for the bank JSCB Evrofinance for three years until it merged with CB Mosnarbank to form JSCB Evrofinance Mosnarbank in December 2003. In 2004, he graduated from the Higher School of Economics (Russian: ГУ ВШЭ) with an MBA in Finance. With support from St Petersburg Security Forces, Boyarskov later headed Rossvyazokhrankultura from 22 March 2007 until 2 June 2008.) In May 2008, he was appointed by President Dmitry Medvedev as a deputy prime minister in a move considered as a demotion. According to Stratfor, "Sechin acts as boss of Russia's gigantic state oil company Rosneft and commands the loyalty of the FSB. Thus, he represents the FSB's hand in Russia's energy sector."

On 27 July 2004, Sechin became the successful and influential chairman of the board of directors of JSC Rosneft, which swallowed up the assets of jailed tycoon Mikhail Khodorkovsky's Yukos. He has additionally been president of Rosneft since May 2012. Khodorkovsky has accused Sechin of plotting to have him arrested and plundering his oil company: "The second as well as the first case were organised by Sechin. He orchestrated the first case against me out of greed and the second out of cowardice." In 2008, Sechin allegedly blocked the replacement of the AAR consortium with Gazprom in the TNK-BP joint venture. (Note: Alfa Group–Access Industries–Renova consortium (AAR) was led by Mikhail Fridman, Len Blavatnik, and Viktor Vekselberg through their companies, TNK, Sidanko, and Onako and their subsidiaries.)

In 2008, Sechin was involved with the BP oil company and did private negotiations with the BP's CEO Bob Dudley. In 2008, Hugo Chávez said that the idea for Venezuelan nuclear energy program came from Sechin. Sechin negotiated deals on weapons and nuclear technology deliveries to Venezuela. In July 2009, Sechin negotiated deals with Cuba that brought Russia into deep-water drilling in the Gulf of Mexico.

Sechin also presides over the board of directors of the United Shipbuilding Corporation, and helped with negotiations with France over the purchase of four Mistral-class ships. Sechin argued that two ships should be constructed in Russia and two in France, as opposed to the initial offer that only one be constructed in Russia. Piotr Żochowski, of the Polish Center for Eastern Studies, argued that "it cannot be ruled out that Sechin's stance on this issue results from his personal financial involvement in the St Petersburg shipbuilding industry".

On 12 April 2011, Sechin resigned from the board of Rosneft upon President Medvedev's 31 March 2011 order for senior officials to resign from large companies. After Vladimir Putin became President of Russia in May 2012, he later resigned as vice prime minister on 21 May 2012 and rejoined the executive board of Rosneft as chairman and became the executive secretary for the Russia Federation's commission on the development strategy of the fuel and energy complex and environmental safety (Russian: комиссии по вопросам стратегии развития ТЭКа и экологической безопасности) in June. (Note: Revealed in a 16 August 2012 article in Forbes, several of Sechin's Rosneft employees gained access to Vyacheslav Volodin associated Prisma terminals (Russian: Терминалы «Призма»), which are also called Volodin's Prisma (Russian: Призма Володина), following the 4 December 2011 Russian legislative elections and the Snow revolution, during which Volodin actively used his Prisma terminal, which he received on the eve of the elections, to counter dissidents in Russia. According to its developers at the Medialogia company (Russian: «Медиалогия»), Prisma tracks in real time 60 million sources and shows the dynamics of negative and positive comments from blogs on a particular event, can build graphs of bot attacks and individually track topics. The website for the Medialogia Company states that Prisma "monitors activities in social media that lead to an increase in social tension: escalation of riots, protest sentiments, extremism; discussion of the level of prices, wages, pensions; problems of housing and communal services, infrastructure, medicine and others." (Russian: "отслеживает в соцмедиа активности, приводящие к росту социальной напряжённости: нагнетание беспорядков, протестные настроения, экстремизм; обсуждение уровня цен, зарплат, пенсий; проблемы ЖКХ, инфраструктуры, медицины и другие"))

In December 2014, a CNBC article noted that Sechin is "widely believed to be Russia's second-most powerful person" after President Putin. In December 2017, The Guardian noted that Sechin "is widely seen as the second most powerful man in Russia after Vladimir Putin".

The Steele dossier alleged that Sechin met with Carter Page in 2016 as a representative of the Donald Trump presidential campaign, and offered Trump the brokerage of a 19.6% private share in Rosneft in exchange for lifting sanctions imposed following the 2014 Russian intervention in Ukraine. (Note: Also, Page met with Igor Diveykin (Russian: Игорь Дивейкин), who was a deputy chief for internal policy with interests about United States elections during the meeting and, since 22 March 2021, has headed the State Duma Apparatus replacing Tatiana Voronova.) The 2019 Mueller Report did not corroborate those allegations, and neither Page nor Sechin were indicted with any crime.

Sechin was instrumental in the arrest and trial of Putin's former minister of economy, Alexei Ulyukaev, charged and found guilty of soliciting a bribe from Sechin. The verdict was delivered after hearing testimony from Sechin in a closed trial, and is another indicator, according to the Financial Times, of the power wielded by Sechin in Russian politics.

In November 2018, Sechin released a statement at the first Russian-Chinese Energy Business Forum in Beijing, about increased levels of cooperation between Rosneft and Chinese owned energy companies, citing "increased protectionism and threats of trade wars" as a reason for the cooperation. Agreements of cooperation were signed between Rosneft and Chinese Hengli Group and include expansion in exploration as well as production and refining.

=== Sanctions ===
On 20 March 2014, the United States government sanctioned Sechin in response to the Russian government's role in the ongoing unrest in Ukraine. The sanctions include a travel ban to the United States, freezing of all assets of Sechin in the United States and a ban on business transactions between American citizens and corporations and Sechin and businesses he owns. Closely associated with Sechin, Rosneft is on the Sectoral Sanctions Identification (SSI) List.

On 28 February 2022, in relation to the Russian invasion of Ukraine, the European Union blacklisted Sechin and had all his assets frozen. In March, the UK government imposed sanctions which involved freezing Sechin's assets and a travel ban. Two superyachts belonging to Sechin, the Amore Vero and the Crescent, had been seized by Spanish and Italian authorities by mid-March as a consequence.

Sechin was sanctioned by the UK government in 2022 in relation to the Russo-Ukrainian War.

== Personal life ==
Sechin has been married twice. He divorced his first wife Marina Sechina (Russian: Марина Сечина) in 2011. Marina increased her wealth after the divorce and was named in The Paradise Papers and, as of 2017, owns a mansion at Serebryany Bor (Russian: Серебряный Бор) in the Khoroshyovo-Mnyovniki District of the North-Western Administrative Okrug of Moscow. After 5 years of marriage, he divorced his second wife Olga Rozhkova (Russian: Ольга Рожкова; born 1990) on 14 June 2017. Olga sailed on the 85.6-metre (281 ft) St Princess Olga which was built by Oceanco in 2012 and delivered in 2013. After the divorce, the super-yacht was renamed Amore Vero ("True Love") in 2017.

With Marina, he has a daughter, Inga (b. 1982), who graduated from the Saint Petersburg Mining University and, as of 2018, works at Surgutneftegasbank (Russian: Сургутнефтегазбанк). Inga married Dmitry Ustinov (b. 1979), a Russian intelligence agent and graduate of the FSB Academy, and son of former Prosecutor General and current Plenipotentiary Envoy to the Southern Federal District Vladimir Ustinov, (Note: In 2010, Vladimir Ustinov's daughter and Dmitry Ustinov's sister, Irina Dmitrievna Ustinova (Russian: Устинова Ирина Дмитриевна) lived in Sochi and is an assistant prosecutor in south Russia's Khostinsky district (Russian: Хостинский район), a district of the city of Sochi.) in 2003. Inga and Dmitry had a son on 4 July 2005. She divorced him and, later, she married Timerbulat Karimov (Russian: Тимербулат Каримов) (b. 1974), a former investment banker and senior vice-president of VTB Bank from October 2011 until February 2014. He is on the board of directors for the Russian Copper Company (Russian: АО «Русская медная компания») which is the third largest in Russia and owned by Igor Altushkin. Since September 2015, she is the only owner of the Moscow based company Khoroshiye Lyudi or Good People (Russian: ООО «Хорошие люди»), which on 4 December 2015, became a 40% owner of the Novgorod Agropark (Russian: ООО «Новгородский агропарк»), (Note: The other owners are 40% by Ildus Fahretdinov (Russian: Ильдус Фахретдинов) through an Ufa "Investment Company" LLC (Russian: ООО «Инвестиционная компания») and 20% by Oleg Chernyavsky through the Moscow "Negotsiant TK" LLC (Russian: ООО «Негоциант ТК»). In 2015, Russia produced nearly 150 thousand tons of turkey by slaughter weight. The Novgorod Agropark expects to produce from 22 to 30 thousand tons per year.) a turkey farm located in Veliky Novgorod.

After the demotion of Vladimir Ustinov in 2006, Sechin reportedly arranged the appointment of Alexander Bastrykin, another ally of his, as Chairman of the Investigative Committee of the Prosecutor General's Office in 2007 in order to retain his influence.

His son Ivan (b. 1989), from his marriage to Marina, graduated from the Lomonosov business school at Moscow State University and worked closely with Igor at Rosneft, as of 2018, as First Deputy Director of the Department of Joint Offshore Projects. Ivan was sanctioned by the U.S. in February 2022. Ivan died on 5 February 2024 under "bizarre circumstances". He was at his home mansion in the Moscow region and woke in the middle of the night complaining to his wife of kidney pain. His security service immediately called an ambulance, but they made a mistake and didn't provide the correct address of the mansion. As a result the ambulance took two hours to arrive, by which time Ivan died. The official diagnosis was blood clot. His father sought an investigation into the security detail.

Varvara is his daughter from his marriage to Olga.

According to some sources, his nickname is Darth Vader.
