= MSU Graduate School of Business Administration =

Coordinates: 55.7060°N 37.5194°E

Graduate School of Business Administration
- Высшая Школа Бизнеса
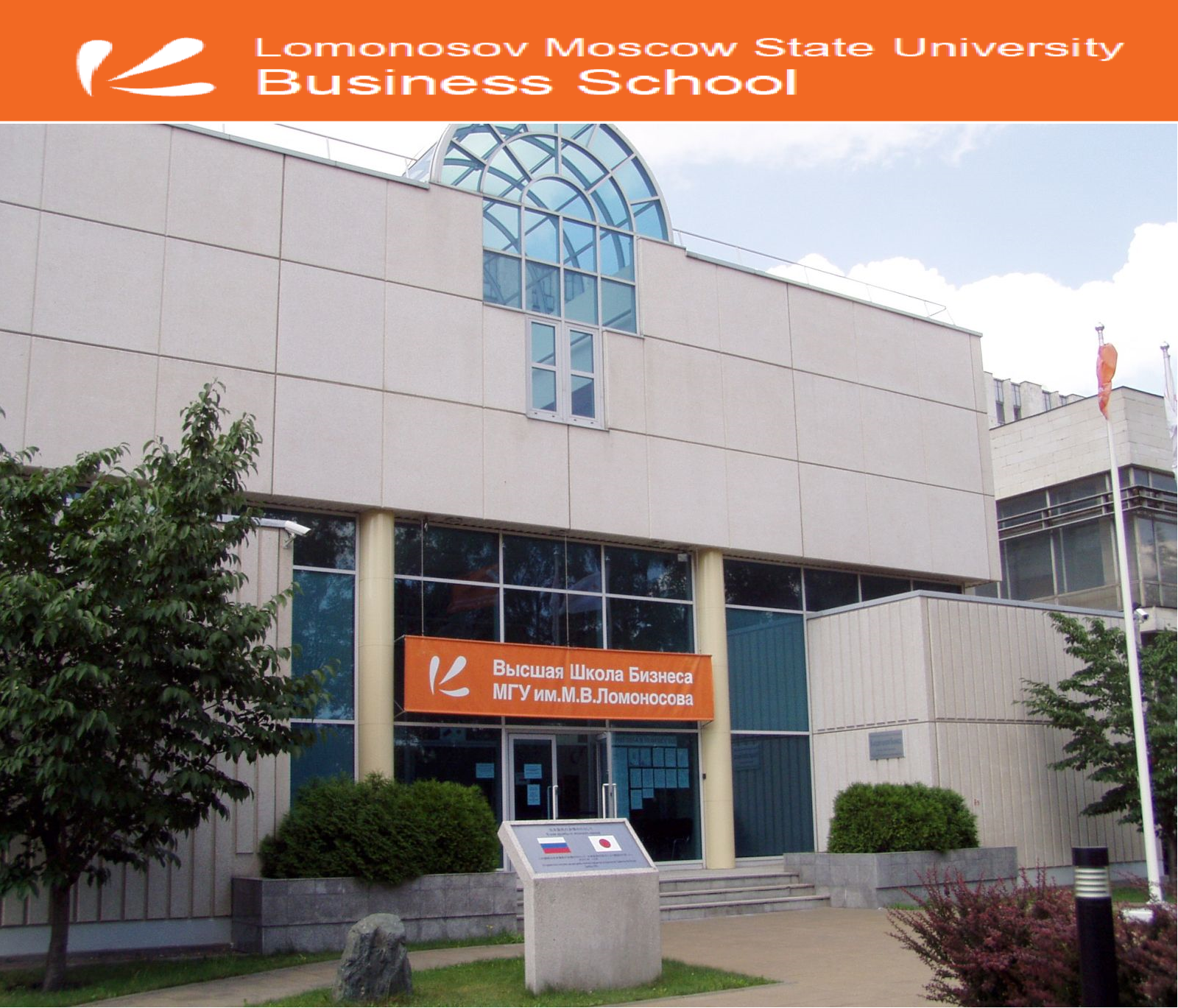
- Other names: Lomonosov Moscow State University Business School
- Type: Public
- Established: 1989
- Dean
- Location: 119234, Moscow, Lenin's mountains, h. 1, building 52, Moscow, Russian Federation
- Language: English, Russian
- Website: en.mgubs.ru

Graduate School of Business Administration (Russian: Высшая Школа Бизнеса МГУ им. Ломоносова), also known as Lomonosov Moscow State University Business School, founded in 1989 in Moscow State University is one GSBA Business School Moscow of the oldest business schools in Russia. Graduate School of Business Administration offers Bachelor of Management, Master in International Business, MBA, Executive MBA Programmes and Doctoral Programme (PhD). Lomonosov MSU BS also offers corporate programmes. Lomonosov MSU BS was ranked #1 in Russia according to the surveys held by the business magazine "Secret Firmy" in 2007, 2008 and 2010.

== Faculty history ==
The Graduate School of Business has started its history in 1989, when one of the first business schools in Russia was opened at the Moscow State University - the School of Management of Moscow State University. In 1995, the MSUBS has opened one of the first programs in Russia "Master of Business Administration (MBA)". In 2001, the MSUBS was assigned to a separate structural unit of the Moscow University in accordance with the decision of the Academic Council of the Moscow State University. In the same year, the construction of the building of the Higher School of Business of Moscow State University, which was sponsored to the Moscow University by the Japanese organisation, was completed. In 2015, a new master program was launched to train IT professionals in the field of management. In 2016, existing program of international business and strategy has opened its doors for the new students from abroad.

History of university
year	events
1989	Opening of the first business school in Russia located in Moscow State University - the School of Management of Moscow State University.
1993	The School of Management of Moscow State University was transformed into the School of Business of Moscow State University.
1995	Opening in the School of Business of Moscow State University one of the first programs in Russia "Master of Business Administration" (MBA).
2001	The Business School of Moscow State University becomes the Faculty of Moscow State University and receives the name "Higher School of Business (Faculty) of Moscow State University". Grand opening of the programs "Master" in the field of "Management" and "Master of Business Administration" (MBA). Grand Opening of the building of the Higher School of Business of Moscow State University named after M.V. Lomonosov.
2004	Opening of the Graduate School of the MSUBS. Opening of program for high school students.
2005	MSUBS in the list of 100 best business schools in the world and 40 of the best business schools in Europe by the results of the study, conducted by the Great Britain agency. The opening in MSUBS of the first in Russia MBA program of the production field "MBA-Production Systems".
2007	Opening of the Executive MBA program.
2008	Opening joint with the European Business School (European Business School, Germany) the Russian-German program "MBA-Logistics". Launching of the short-term Executive Programs.
2010	MSUBS retains leadership in the ranking of the top 20 business schools in Russia and the 2nd place in the EDUNIVERSAL ranking in the category "Best Business Schools Known at the International Level". The financial courses of the MSUBS are accredited by CIMA (Chartered Institute of Management Accountants). Launch of the "double diploma" program together with the University of St. Petersburg. Andrews (UK).
2012	MSUBS has joined to the UN Global Compact initiative. Joining to this initiative makes MSUBS a part of the international community of like-minded people who work on the principles and methods of ethical business in different countries of the world.
2012	MSUBS has joined the CEEMAN Central and Eastern European Management Development Association.
2015	The Master's program of the MSUBS has received international accreditation ABEST21.
2016	Existing program of international business and strategy start teaching on English.

== Education program ==
Students are trained in the field of management.

=== Bachelor’s degree ===
The "Bachelor" program of the Higher School of Business of Moscow State University is a 4-year program of management education for graduates of secondary and special educational institutions. Classes are held during the day, the form of studying is full-time. Upon graduation, the graduates receive a State Diploma of Higher education with a Bachelor of Management degree. The Bachelor program includes a number of compulsory courses and elective courses, including such disciplines as: accounting, innovative management, marketing, international business, organizational behavior, management fundamentals, strategic management, HR management, financial management, organization theory, corporate social responsibility of business, etc. All training has a practical focus. All students pass compulsory practice in companies. Beginning with the 3rd year, students study up to 70% of the subjects in English.

=== Master's degree ===
The "Master" program is a two-year program of the second stage of higher education. The program is designed for graduates of universities with a bachelor's degree or a diploma of a specialist aimed at building a career or developing their own business. The MSc MSU has two areas of training: "International Business and Strategy" and. The program "International Business and Strategy" is a program whose content meets the requirements of the professional standard "Information Technology Manager" (approved by the order of the Ministry of Labor of Russia No. 915 of October 13, 2014).

=== MBA ===
The program is constructed in the form of thematic modules, within which the training courses are replaced by master classes, discussions, group discussions and company visits. The emphasis is on practical exercises that allow developing skills in analyzing real business situations, searching for and making managerial decisions. The format of the program requires students to be highly involved in the learning process, not only during the training modules, but also between them (preparing for modules and performing tasks on the topics discussed on the module).
