= TNK-BP =

Former Russian oil company

- Type: Public (OAO)
- Industry: Oil and gas
- Predecessor: TNK; ONAKO; Sidanko
- Founded: 2003 (Moscow)
- Defunct: 2013
- Fate: Acquired by Rosneft
- Headquarters: Moscow, Russia
- Key people: Eduard Khudainatov (appointed CEO)
- Products: Petroleum; Natural gas Refined oil products
- Revenue: US$60.2 billion (2011)
- Net income: US$9.0 billion (2011)
- Total assets: US$37.1 billion (2011)
- Number of employees: Approximately 50,000
- Website: www.tnk-bp.com/en/

TNK-BP (Tyumenskaya Neftyanaya Kompaniya, lit. 'Tyumen Oil Company') was a major vertically integrated Russian oil company headquartered in Moscow. It was Russia's third-largest oil producer and among the ten largest private oil companies in the world. In 2013 it was acquired by Russian oil company Rosneft.

DeGolyer and MacNaughton confirmed that as of 31 December 2009 TNK-BP's total proved reserves amounted to 11.667 billion barrels (1.8549×10^{9} m^{3}) of oil equivalent.

== History ==
On 1 September 2003, BP and a group of Russian businessmen represented by the AAR Consortium (Alfa-Access-Renova) announced the creation of TNK-BP, a strategic partnership to jointly hold their oil assets in Russia and Ukraine. AAR contributed its holdings in TNK International, ONAKO, Sidanko, Rusia Petroleum (which held licenses for the Kovykta field and the Verkhnechonsk field), and the Rospan field in West Siberia (the New Urengoy and East Urengoy deposits). BP contributed its holdings in Sidanko, Rusia Petroleum, and its BP Moscow retail network. In January 2004, BP and AAR further agreed to incorporate AAR's 50% stake in Slavneft into TNK-BP. Slavneft, which has operations in Russia and Belarus, was previously owned jointly by AAR and Sibneft (now Gazprom Neft). The joint-venture was initially a 50-50 split, where both partners needed to agree on the course of future action.

In 2009, TNK-BP increased production to 1.69 million barrels per day (269×10^{3} m^{3}/d) of oil equivalent (excluding TNK-BP's share in Slavneft production) compared to 1.642 million barrels per day (261.1×10^{3} m^{3}/d) of oil equivalent produced in 2008. In 2009, TNK-BP's total proved reserves replacement ratio reached 329% according to PRMS methodology (formerly known as SPE). The average SEC LOF reserve replacement ratio over the past five years amounted to 139%.

On 18 October 2010, TNK-BP and BP reached an agreement for TNK-BP to acquire BP's upstream and pipeline assets in Vietnam and Venezuela for an overall price of $US1.8 billion.

In October 2011, the TNK-BP agreed to acquire a 45% stake in Amazon oil exploration blocks from Brazil's HRT Participaoes for $1 billion.

On 21 March 2013, Rosneft completed acquisition of TNK-BP.

== Corporate structure ==
Rosneft owns TNK-BP International Limited, which in turn owns 95% of TNK-BP Holding, with the other 5% floating freely on public markets. According to Rosneft's CEO Igor Sechin, no discussion had been held on a buyout of minority shareholders in TNK-BP Holding.

== Operations ==
TNK-BP is a vertically integrated oil company with a diversified upstream and downstream portfolio in Russia and Ukraine. Its upstream operations are located primarily in Siberia and Volga-Urals region. In 2009 the company (excluding its 50% share in Slavneft) produced on average 1.69 million barrels per day (269×10^{3} m^{3}/d) of oil equivalent.

In downstream, TNK-BP controls 675 thousand barrels per day (107.3×10^{3} m^{3}/d) in installed refining capacity, with principal refining assets such as Ryazan Refinery, Saratov Refinery, Nizhnevartovsk Refinery, and Lysychansk Oil Refinery. The company operates a retail network of approximately 1,400 filling stations in Russia and Ukraine working under the BP and TNK brands. The company is one of the key suppliers to the Moscow retail market and is a market leader in Ukraine.

One of TNK-BP's strategic goals is to expand its natural gas business. Its main gas asset in Rospan International, owned 100% by TNK-BP. Rospan is located in the Yamal-Nenets autonomous area with significant gas potential of 1.4 million barrels per day (220×10^{3} m^{3}/d) of oil equivalent of natural gas 3P reserves and an ability to produce 15 billion cubic meters per year.

One of TNK-BP's stated long-term aims is to enter into the international market. On 18 October 2010, TNK-BP and BP reached an agreement for TNK-BP to acquire BP's upstream and pipeline assets in Vietnam and Venezuela for an overall price of $US1.8 billion. According to the terms of the agreements, in Venezuela TNK-BP will acquire from BP a 16.7% equity stake in the PetroMonagas SA extra heavy oil producer, a 40% stake in Petroperija SA which operates the DZO field, and a 26.7% stake in Boqueron SA. In Vietnam, TNK-BP will acquire from BP a 35% stake in an upstream offshore gas production block containing the Lan Tay and Lan Do gas condensate fields, a 32.7% stake in the Nam Con Son Pipeline and Terminal, and a 33.3% stake in the Phu My 3 power plant.

The company also acquired several other entities in Brazil. Thus, its oil production from international subsidiaries increased to 10% of TNK-BP's total oil production.

Over 2009, despite an average decline in crude oil price of 36% year-on-year, TNK-BP generated profit of $5 billion. Since the company's emergence in 2003, TNK-BP's profits have risen from $2.7 billion to $5.3 billion in 2009.

In 2009, TNK-BP produced 12.5 billion cubic meters of associated petroleum gas with a utilization rate of 84.4%.

In 2011, the company's capitalization amounted to $60 billion.

== Corporate disputes ==
In 2008, a corporate dispute between the major shareholders arose as BP and AAR seemed to have differing visions for the company's corporate governance structure and future strategy. During the dispute, it was rumoured that some Western BP executives experienced visa problems, and the American CEO Robert Dudley was accused by AAR of having violated Russian laws.

On 4 September 2008, the parties to the dispute signed a five-page memorandum of understanding, thus signaling the end of the disagreements. Robert Dudley stepped down from his role as CEO of TNK-BP and AAR achieved to have their President Mikhail Fridman installed as interim CEO.

After the dispute was settled, the general consensus was that although AAR had increased its influence, BP would be happy to keep its 50% stake as TNK BP represented 24% of BP's production and 19% of total reserves in 2007. Some investors had feared BP might lose its interest in TNK-BP with only minimal compensation. Tony Hayward, BP's chief executive at the time, described the five-page memorandum as "a very sensible and pragmatic way of looking forward".

In January 2010, BP and its Russian co-shareholders held their first joint media briefing to pronounce their tensions gone and TNK-BP.'s prospects bright.

In January 2011, BP and Russia's state oil company, Rosneft, formed a strategic partnership on Arctic development. In March 2011 the Stockholm International Arbitration court blocked the BP-Rosneft deal as breaching TNK–BP earlier contractual arrangements. BP had previously signed a shareholding agreement with AAR, which stipulated that TNK–BP would be the primary corporate vehicle for BP's oil and gas operations in Russia. AAR's legal action and minority shareholder's claims led to the collapse of the BP-Rosneft deal in August 2011, when BP was replaced with ExxonMobil as Rosneft's strategic foreign partner in the Arctic.

== Environmental record ==
TNK-BP has been criticized for its Siberian oil spills. In 2012 Russia's Natural Resources Minister Yuri Trutnev announced that regulators plan to seek damages from TNK-BP as one of the biggest polluters of the Ob and Yenisei river basins in Siberia. He also recommended the company prepare a plan for replacing its pipelines. Each year, 300,000 to 500,000 tonnes of oil and oil products are leaked into the Ob and Yenisei river basins, with TNK-BP the biggest offender. In 2011 TNK-BP reported a total 1,186 pipeline ruptures. According to TNK-BP, the company has paid $2.1 billion for clean-up since 2003 and has established a $500 million fund "to resolve the inherited environmental problems, accumulated since 1962."

== See also ==
- Petroleum industry in Russia
