= Rosneft =

Russian energy company headquartered in Moscow

PJSC Rosneft

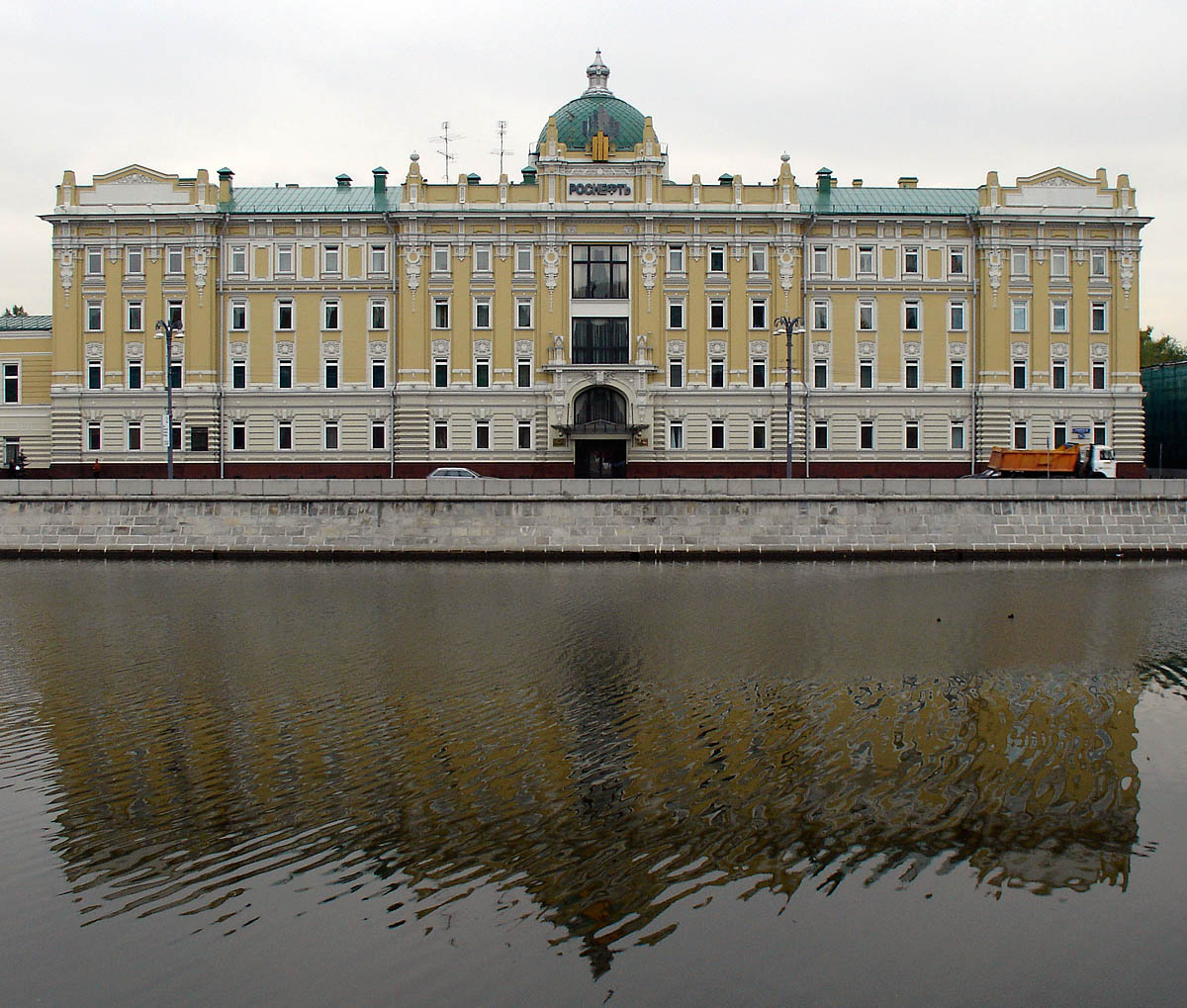
- Rosneft Headquarters, Sofiyskaya Embankment, Moscow, September 2005
- Native name: ПAO «Росне́фть»
- Type: PJSC
- Traded as: MCX: ROSN
- Industry: Petroleum
- Predecessor: Ministry of Oil and Gas (Soviet Union)
- Founded: 1993; 33 years ago
- Headquarters: Moscow, Russia
- Area served: Russia
- Key people: Mohammed Saleh Al Sada (chairman); Igor Sechin (CEO)
- Products: Petroleum; Natural gas Motor fuels Petrochemicals
- Revenue: ₽8.16 trillion (US$95.75 billion) (2025)
- Operating income: ₽1.09 trillion (US$12.79 billion) (2025)
- Net income: ₽544 billion (US$6.38 billion) (2025)
- Total assets: ₽21.6 trillion (US$253.46 billion) (2025)
- Owner: Rosneftegaz + subsidiaries (70%); QIA (18.46%); (2021)
- Number of employees: 334,600 (2019)
- Subsidiaries: Nayara Energy (49.13%)
- Website: rosneft.com

Rosneft Oil (Russian: Роснефть, romanized: Rosneft', IPA: [ˌrosˈnʲeftʲ] stylized as ROSNEFT) is a Russian public joint-stock company (PJSC) integrated energy company based in Moscow. Rosneft specializes in the exploration, extraction, production, refining, transport, sale of petroleum, natural gas, and petroleum products. Russian state-owned Rosneftegaz is the parent company. Its name is a portmanteau of the Russian words Rossiyskaya neft (Russian: Российская нефть, lit. 'Russian oil').

Rosneft was founded in 1993 as a state enterprise and then incorporated in 1995, acquiring many state-controlled gas and oil assets. It became Russia's leading oil company after purchasing assets of the former oil company Yukos at state-run auctions. After acquiring OJSC TNK-BP in 2013, one of the largest oil companies in Russia, Rosneft, became the world's largest publicly traded petroleum company.

Rosneft is the second largest Russian company and state-controlled company in Russia in terms of revenue (₽4,134 billion). Internationally, it is one of the largest oil companies, ranking 24 in terms of revenue. In the 2020 Forbes Global 2000, Rosneft was ranked as the 53rd-largest public company in the world. The company operates in more than 20 countries around the world.

In 2024, ROSNEFT was responsible for 690 Mt of CO_{2} emissions, which was 1.79% of global CO_{2} emissions.

== History ==
=== Origins ===
Rosneft has played a major role in the history of Russia's oil industry. The first use of the name Rosneft dates back to the late 19th century, when exploration of oil fields in Sakhalin began in 1889. Most of Rosneft's current assets were acquired during the Soviet era.

=== 1990s ===
Rosneft was established in 1993 as a unitary enterprise with assets previously held by Rosneftegaz, the successor to the Soviet Union's Ministry of Oil Industry. During the early 1990s, almost all Russian oil companies and refineries were extracted from Rosneft to form ten integrated companies. Later, their number was halved due to acquisitions. On 29 September 1995, an Order of the Government of Russia No. 971 transformed Rosneft into an open joint stock company.

In March 1996, Rosneft founded the Russian Regional Development Bank. Rosneft struggled financially and operationally during the 1998 Russian financial crisis with decreased production due to poor assets and lower retail sales with an underused refining capacity. In July 1998, the Russian government tried to sell Rosneft, but it failed.

In October 1998, the Russian government appointed Sergey Bogdanchikov as president. The company owned two obsolete refineries and several low-productive and poorly managed oil-producing assets. In the late 1990s, plans for Rosneft's privatization in Russia were made, but due to competition with equally influential pretenders, they were not carried out.

=== 2000s ===
From 2002 to 2004, the company's primary objectives were to strengthen control over its assets, reduce its debt burden, and obtain licenses in Eastern Siberia. The determining factor in enhancing the role of Rosneft in the Russian oil industry has been the support of the country's top leadership. The company, during this time, managed to restore its status after its rough start in the 1990s with the acquisition of Krasnodar Oil and Gas Company in 2002 and Northern Oil Company in early 2003. In addition, in 2002, the company received a license for the development of the Sakhalin-IV and Sakhalin-V project, and in 2003 a license for the development of the Sakhalin-III project.

In 2005, Rosneft acquired a 25.94% stake in the company Verkhnechonskneftegaz and became the leading oil company of Russia in terms of production. In 2007, the company entered the annual list of the one hundred most respected firms and companies in the world, as compiled by the weekly Barron's, in 99th place. By the same year, Rosneft produced 100 million barrels of oil, 20% of Russia's output at the time. In March 2007, Rosneft had announced it hoped to increase production from 80 million tonnes to 103 million tonnes from 2006 to the end of 2007, extract 140 million tonnes of oil by 2012, and become a global top three energy company. When the Great Recession struck Russia in late 2008, Rosneft was able to endure the economic pains by improving and strengthening business lines, management, and transparency, and as a result, became a leading oil company domestically and internationally.

In February 2009, several agreements were negotiated between Russia and China that provided a 20-year contract for an annual supply of 15 million tons of oil between the Chinese National Petroleum Corporation (CNPC) and Rosneft, cooperation between CNPC and Transneft to construct and operate a branch of the Eastern Siberia–Pacific Ocean (ESPO) oil pipeline to China, and the provision of loans for US$25 billion—US$15 billion from Rosneft and US$10 billion from Transneft—by the China Development Bank on the security of supplies.

==== Acquisition of assets of Yukos ====
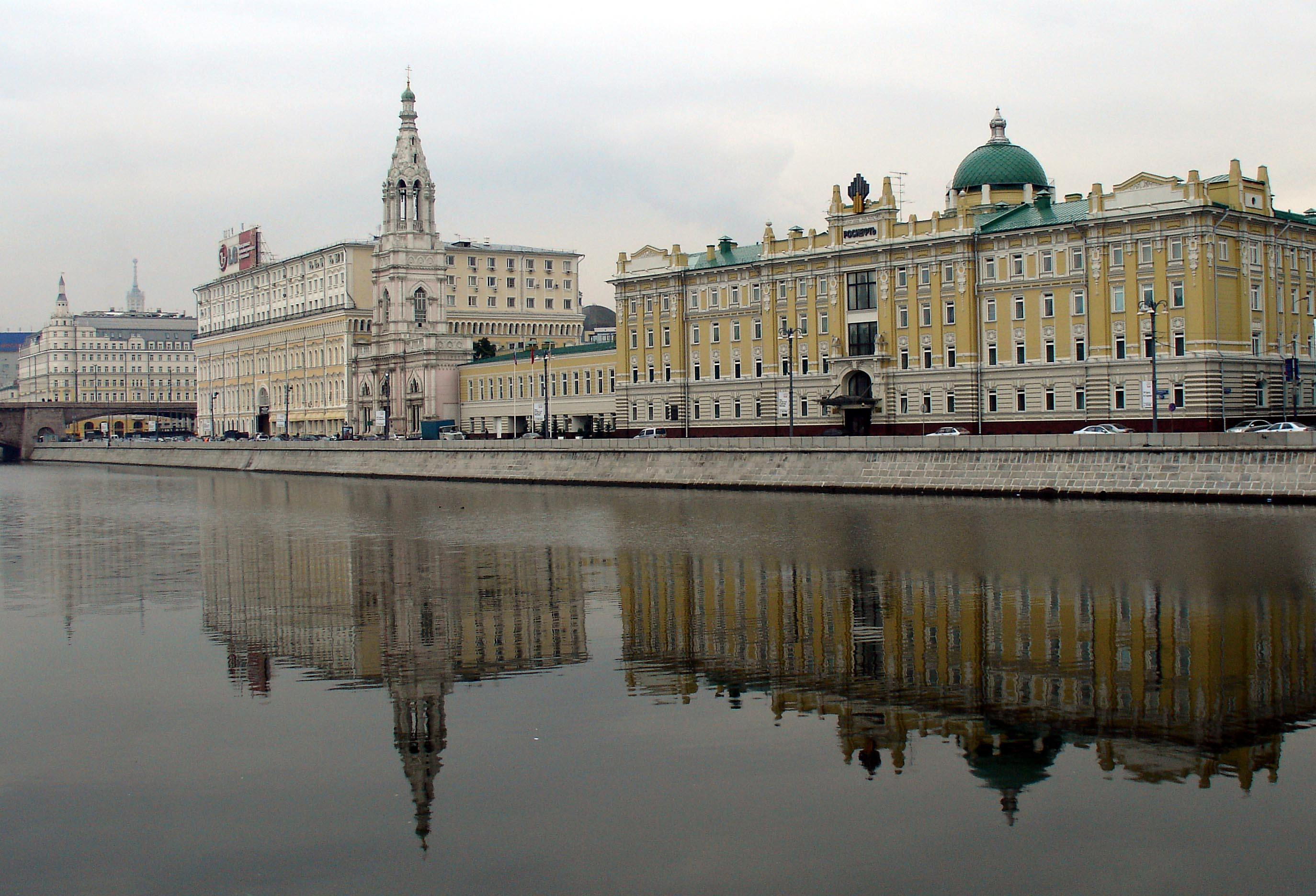
The Rosneft headquarters next to the Saint Sophia Church on the bank of the Moskva River

Starting in 2004, the Russian government organized a series of auctions to sell the assets of Yukos Oil Company, of which Rosneft won the majority. On 22 December 2004, Rosneft purchased Baikal Finance Group, which bought Yuganskneftegaz (Yugansk), a main asset of Yukos, three days earlier at a state-run auction for US$9.35 billion to satisfy tax debts. According to some estimates, this operation was directed by Russian authorities to nationalize Russia's oil and gas industry. In response to the deal, Andrei Illarionov, then a senior Putin economic advisor, denounced it as "fraud of the year".

In 2005, Mikhail Khodorkovsky (former chairman of Menatep) and Platon Lebedev (business partner of Khodorkovsky) were sentenced to nine years in prison for fraud and tax evasion. In February 2007, they were charged again and accused of stealing $25 billion worth of oil from Yukos subsidiaries. They were convicted, but in 2013 Putin pardoned Khodorkovsky, and in 2014, the Russian supreme court announced that Lebedev should also be freed early.

The purchase of Yugansk in 2005 significantly increased the number of assets and production for Rosneft. Subsequently, Rosneft filed a lawsuit against Yukos in connection with the use of understated transfer prices for the purchase of oil from Yuganskneftegaz before its breakup. At the same time, Rosneft itself also purchased oil and gas from its subsidiary, Yuganskneftegaz, at transfer prices.

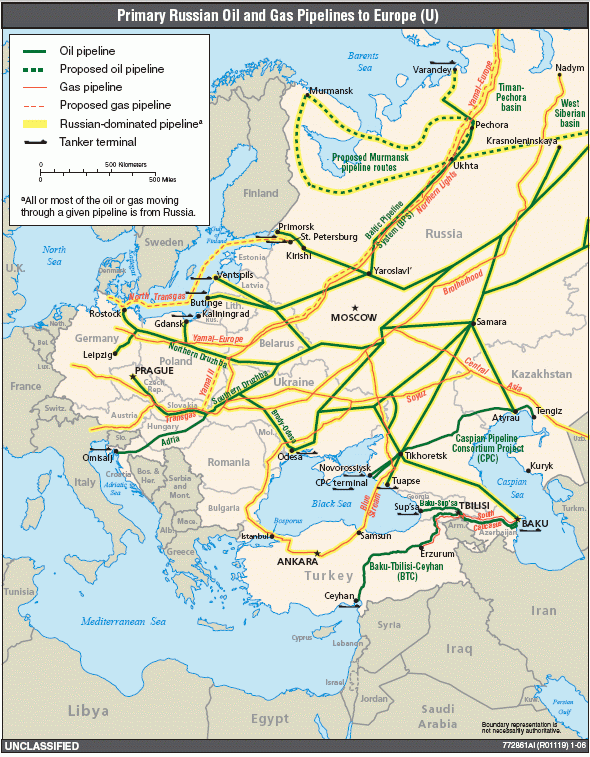
Major existing and planned natural oil and gas pipelines supplying Russian oil and gas to Europe

In May 2007, Rosneft won several auctions for the sale of Yukos' assets, including five refineries and the oil companies Tomsk Oil Company and Samara Oil and Gas Company, thereby becoming the largest oil company in Russia. According to experts at the Russian newspaper Vedomosti, the assets of Yukos, purchased by Rosneft at an auction organized by the state, were acquired at a discount of 43.4% of the market price of this property. In 2007, the former assets of Yukos accounted for 72.6% of oil and gas condensate production and 74.2% of Rosneft's primary refining capacity. In June, Rosneft paid $731 million for the transportation assets of Yukos, which had declared bankrupt in August 2006 after three years of litigation over tax arrears. In August, Bogdanchikov said that although the Yukos acquisitions had increased Rosnefts debt to $US 26 billion, he planned to reduce debt to 30% of total assets by 2010 by tripling refining capacity and expand into China.

==== Initial public offering of 2006 ====
In July 2006, Rosneft placed 15% of its shares traded with a total value of US$10.7 billion in an initial public offering (IPO) at the London Stock Exchange, the Russian Trading System, and the Moscow Interbank Currency Exchange. Part of the shares were distributed among the Russian population through banks such as Sberbank and Gazprombank.

The Federal Service for Financial Markets authorized the placement and circulation outside the country of a 22.5% stake in Rosneft. Rosneft announced a placement value of US$5.85–7.85 per share and global depository receipt (GDR), based on the company's capitalization after consolidation of US$60–80 billion. It planned to place shares for at least US$8.5 billion to repay loans to Western banks, including interest and taxes.

On 14 July, the official results of the placement value were announced. Shares were priced at US$7.55, almost at the upper end of the price band, resulting in Rosneft's capitalization—taking into account the upcoming consolidation of its subsidiaries—at a value of US$79.8 billion, making Rosneft surpass Lukoil as the largest oil company in Russia. Investors purchased 1.38 billion shares for US$10.4 billion: 21% of the shares were acquired by strategic investors, 36% by international investors from North America, Europe, and Asia, 39% by Russian investors, and 4% by Russian retail investors. 49.4% of the total IPO volume was accounted for by four investors, including BP for US$1 billion, Petronas for US$1.5 billion, and the CNPC for US$0.5 billion. Individuals submitted applications for the purchase of 99,431,775 shares of the oil company. As a result, most of the new shareholders were individuals, partly because this IPO was given the unofficial name of "people's."

Rosneft's IPO became the largest in Russian history and the fifth-largest in the world at the time, in terms of the amount of money raised. The announced amount could increase by another US$400 million if the global placement coordinators realize the option of buying another 53 million GDRs of Rosneft at the price of placement within 30 days.

==== On Abkhazia ====
On 26 May 2009, a five-year cooperation agreement was negotiated between Rosneft and the Abkhazia's Ministry of Economy. The parties stated their intention to develop mutually beneficial cooperation in areas as geological prospecting, development of oil and gas fields, production of hydrocarbons, and sale of oil, natural gas, and oil products. Rosneft undertook exploration on the shelf in the Ochamchire area, discovering preliminary reserves estimated at 200 million to 500 million tons of oil equivalent. In addition to drilling and creating its own sales network, Rosneft also planned the construction of mini-refineries in Abkhazia.

According to Rosneft, the company provides more than half of the retail sales of oil products in Abkhazia. In 2014, Rosneft exported 47 thousand tons of oil products to Abkhazia. Since 2015, Rosneft has been supplying aviation fuel for Sukhumi Babushara Airport. As part of the project to develop the Gudauta area on the Black Sea shelf, Rosneft conducted a comprehensive range of geophysical and geochemical research, carried out 2D and 3D seismic surveys, and initiated preparations for exploratory drilling. In June 2014, Rosneft extended the shelf study period to five years.

In July 2015, however, the new President of Abkhazia, Raul Khajimba, who replaced Alexander Ankvab after his resignation, spoke out against the exploration and production of oil on the offshore shelf of Abkhazia and asked the People's Assembly to consider the possibility of establishing a "commission for the comprehensive study of issues related to the conclusion of contracts for exploration and production hydrocarbons by the previous Abkhaz leadership." A group of deputies of the People's Assembly drafted a bill banning the development of hydrocarbons in Abkhazia. Supporters of the bill demanded the prohibition of the development of the offshore shelf in Abkhazia for 30 years.

=== 2010s ===
In September 2010, Eduard Khudainatov replaced Sergei Bogdanchikov as CEO of the company. On 15 October 2010, Russian President Dmitry Medvedev signed an agreement with President of Venezuela Hugo Chávez for the PDVSA to sell 50% of the shares of German company Ruhr Oel to Rosneft, giving Rosneft oil refining assets in Germany. Since 23 May 2012, former Deputy Prime Minister Igor Sechin became the company's CEO, succeeding Khudaynatov, who received the post of vice-president. In the summer of 2012, Rosneft purchased a fuel oil terminal from the United Shipbuilding Corporation (USC) located on the territory of the Murmansk Ship Repair Plant No. 35. The transaction value is estimated at US$28 million. According to Kommersant, the Murmansk terminal can be used as a platform for Rosneft's activities in the Arctic.

In October 2016, Rosneft bought a 49% stake in Essar Oil of India, along with Russian investment fund United Capital, in a deal worth $13 billion. On 7 December 2016, Rosneft signed a deal to sell 19.5% of the outstanding shares, or roughly US$11 billion, to the Anglo-Swiss multinational commodity trader Glencore and the Qatar Investment Authority. Officially, the stake was split 50/50 between Glencore and Qatar, but Glencore contributed only €300 million and claims only a 0.54% stake. The ownership structure includes a Cayman Islands company, QHG Cayman Limited, whose ownership can not be traced. After the transaction, Rosneft's holding company Rosneftegaz retained 50% + 1 share of the company.

On 2 October 2017, the PLA-linked CEFC China Energy bought a $9 billion stake in Rosneft. On 26 September 2017, the Russian government controversially approved the former German chancellor Gerhard Schröder as chairman of Rosneft. In May 2018, it was announced that the Qatar-Glencore consortium is cancelling the plan to sell a $9.1 billion (14%) stake of Rosneft to CEFC China Energy. With the dissolution of the consortium, the Qatar Investment Authority purchased the shares instead, thereby solidifying its position as one of the biggest shareholders (19%) of Rosneft. In the 2010s, the extensive contact between Rosneft and ExxonMobil were further deepened, with Igor Sechin and Rex Tillerson getting to know each other personally.

==== Arctic shelf deals with BP and ExxonMobil ====
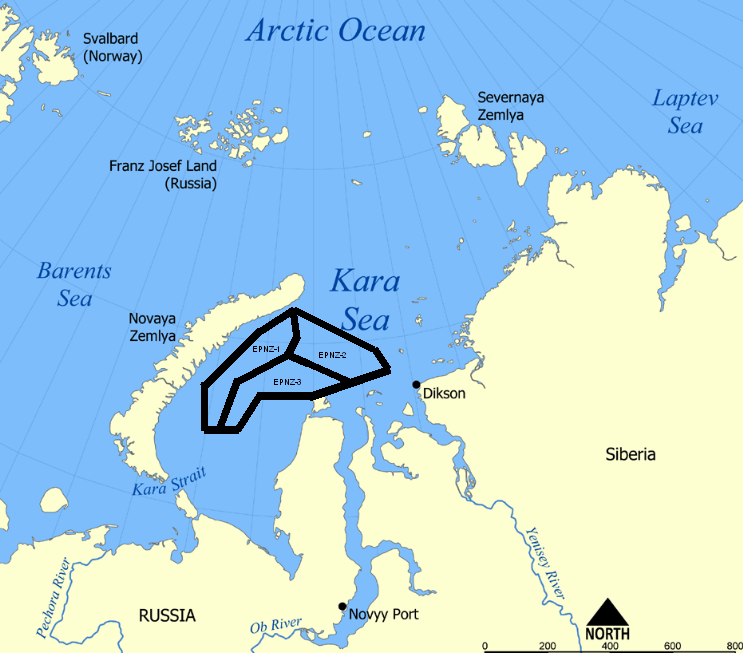
Location of the EPNZ-1, EPNZ-2 and EPNZ-3 oil and gas areas in the Kara Sea

On 15 January 2011, Rosneft and BP announced a deal to develop the East-Prinovozemelsky field on the Russian arctic shelf between the Yamal Peninsula and Novaya Zemlya island. As part of the deal Rosneft was to receive 5% of BP's shares, worth approximately $7.8 billion, as of January 2011 and BP would get approximately 9.5% of Rosneft's shares in exchange. According to the deal, the two companies would create an Arctic technology centre in Russia to develop technologies and engineering practices for safe arctic hydrocarbons extraction. AAR, which represents four billionaires of Russian origin and is BP's Russian partner in the TNK-BP joint venture, blocked the BP–Rosneft deal in international courts, arguing it breached earlier contracts between BP and AAR.

The TNK-BP partners had previously signed a shareholding agreement which stipulated that their Russian joint venture would be the primary corporate vehicle for BP's oil and gas operations in Russia. On 30 August 2011, Rosneft announced that instead of BP, the partner for EPNZ-1, EPNZ-2 and EPNZ-3 in the Kara Sea will be ExxonMobil. In exchange, subject to approval by U.S. regulators, Rosneft was granted a share in oil production in Russian fields, as well as participation in U.S. fields in Texas and the Gulf of Mexico.

==== Black Sea shelf deal with ExxonMobil ====
On 27 January 2011, Rosneft and the American company ExxonMobil signed a deal to establish a joint venture for prospecting and extracting oil from the Tuapse field deepwater area on the Black Sea shelf, near the coast of the Krasnodar Krai. The value of the deal is unknown, but ExxonMobil is expected to invest $1 billion in the project. The venture will be shared 50–50 between the companies during the prospecting phase, and two-thirds to one-third in Rosneft's favour during the extraction phase. The Tuapse Trough is estimated to contain 7.2 billion barrels of oil equivalent. The first well could be drilled in 2012. The deal also contains options for additional cooperation, such as extended exploration and production, deliveries to Rosneft's oil refinery in Tuapse, development of transport infrastructure and research on offshore oil production technologies. According to analysts, offshore areas are central to Rosneft's expansionist plans, and the company is looking for foreign cooperation to bring in new technology and share risks.

In April 2017, the Trump administration denied ExxonMobil permission to continue a deal with Rosneft to drill for oil in Russia.

==== TNK-BP acquisition ====
On 22 October 2012, it was announced that Rosneft will take over TNK-BP International, a parent company of TNK-BP Holding, which is the third largest oil company in Russia. BP will receive in exchange of its stake $12.3 billion of cash and 18.5% of Rosneft's share, while ARR received $28 billion in cash. According to Rosneft's CEO Igor Sechin, no discussion was held on a buyout of minority shareholders in TNK-BP Holding. The deal was completed on 20 March 2013.

=== 2020s ===
On 27 February 2022, BP announced that it would divest its 19.75% stake in Rosneft in response to the Russian invasion of Ukraine that took place in February 2022. In 2022, Trafigura wound down its relationship with Rosneft, Rosneft asked 2Rivers to take Trafigura's place. The week beginning 19 April 2022, Rosneft attempted to sell millions of barrels of Urals, one of Russia's three main export-grade crude oils. The offer failed to attract any customers. Following the 2022 Russian invasion of Ukraine, more than half of Rosneft's 11-member board had quit, forcing the company into a major reshuffle at its annual general meeting on 30 June 2022. Taieb Belmahdi, a former executive at Qatar's state-owned QE, has been elected chairman of the board to replace ex-German chancellor Gerhard Schröder, who stepped down in May.

In November 2023 a Rosneft subsidiary Sakhalinmorneftegaz-Shelf was given the job of managing Sakhalin-I with an 11.5% interest in the project. In January 2024, Ukrainian retaliatory drone strikes hit at least four oil and gas terminals across Russia, including Rosneft's Tuapse oil terminal on the Black Sea coast. On 13 March 2024, Ukrainian drones set fire to Rosneft's oil refinery in Ryazan, the seventh largest in Russia, causing injuries according to the regional governor. The refinery is responsible for 8% of Russian aviation fuel, 6.4% of gasoline, 4.1% of diesel, and 7.7% of fuel oil. Another drone was shot down over the Kirishi refinery, Russia's second largest, without causing damage or injuries.

On 15 October 2025, the UK placed sanctions on Rosneft, Lukoil and 88 other entities which were considered to be supporting Russia's war. In October 2025, oil and gas revenues in Russia decreased 27% compared to the previous year and Rosneft was the most affected exporter. In December 2025, Rosneft had a 70% year-on-year drop in net profit, the highest ever recorded in its history. Rosneft reported an 18.8% lower annual revenue in 2025 due to lower prices caused by sanctions against Russia and the sustained appreciation of the ruble.

== Sanctions ==
On 16 July 2014, the Obama administration imposed sanctions through the US Department of Treasury's Office of Foreign Assets Control (OFAC) by adding Rosneft and other entities to the Sectoral Sanctions List (SSL) in retaliation for the annexation of the Crimean Peninsula by the Kremlin and the ongoing Russian interference in Ukraine. On 12 September 2014 the United Kingdom also sanctioned Rosneft. The first Trump administration expanded further sanctions on its Swiss-incorporated company (Rosneft Trading S.A.) and its president Didier Casimiro on 18 February 2020, for supporting Venezuela's Nicolás Maduro regime by operating in the oil sector of the Venezuelan economy. In March 2022, as a result of the 2022 Russian invasion of Ukraine the EU imposed sanctions on Rosneft.

New Zealand sanctioned Rosneft. On 22 October 2025, the United States imposed sanctions on Rosneft. The U.S. also threatened secondary sanctions against foreign financial institutions and companies that continue to do business with Rosneft, which would affect its customers in Turkey, China and India.

== Operations ==
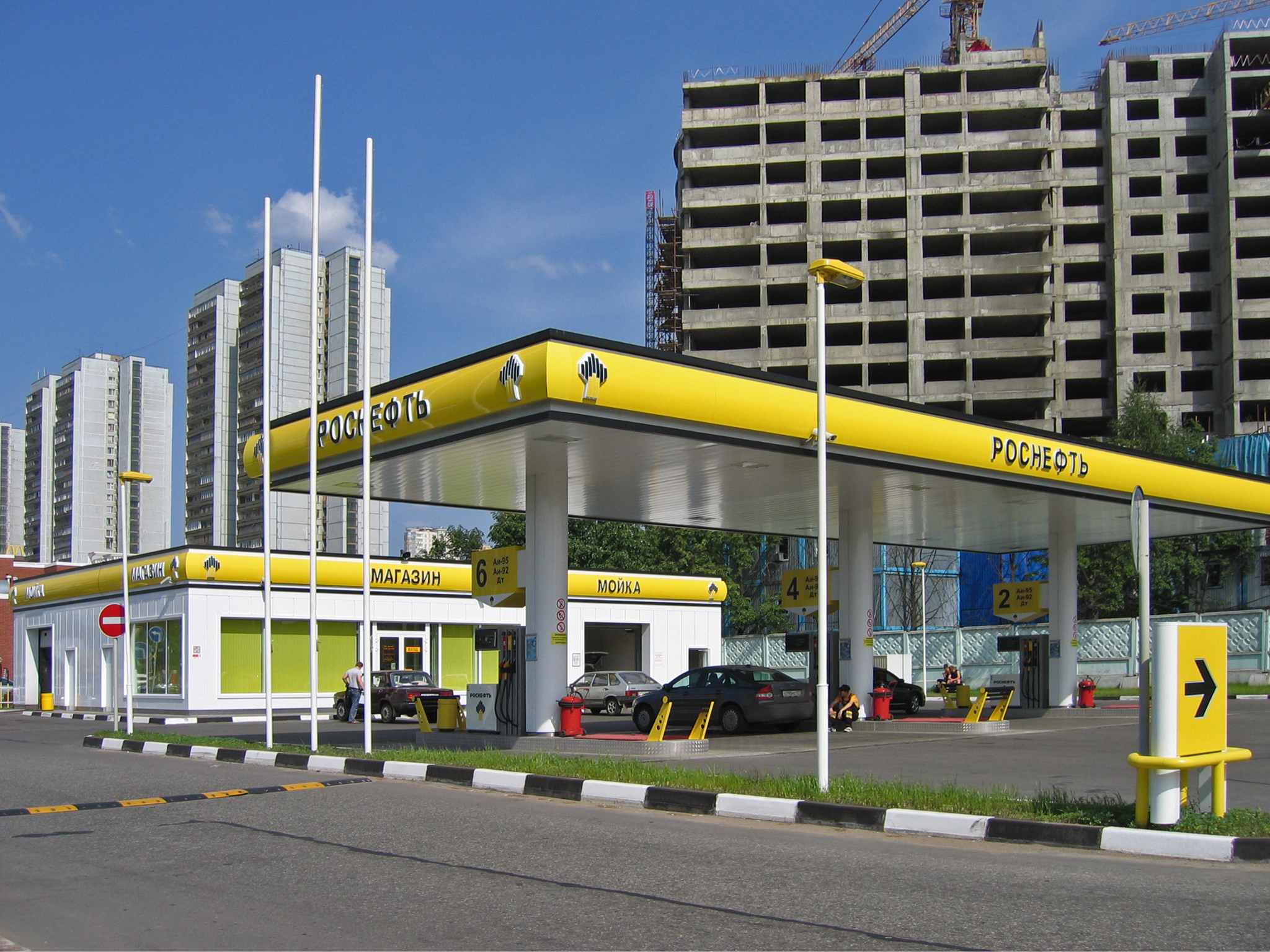
Rosneft filling station in Moscow

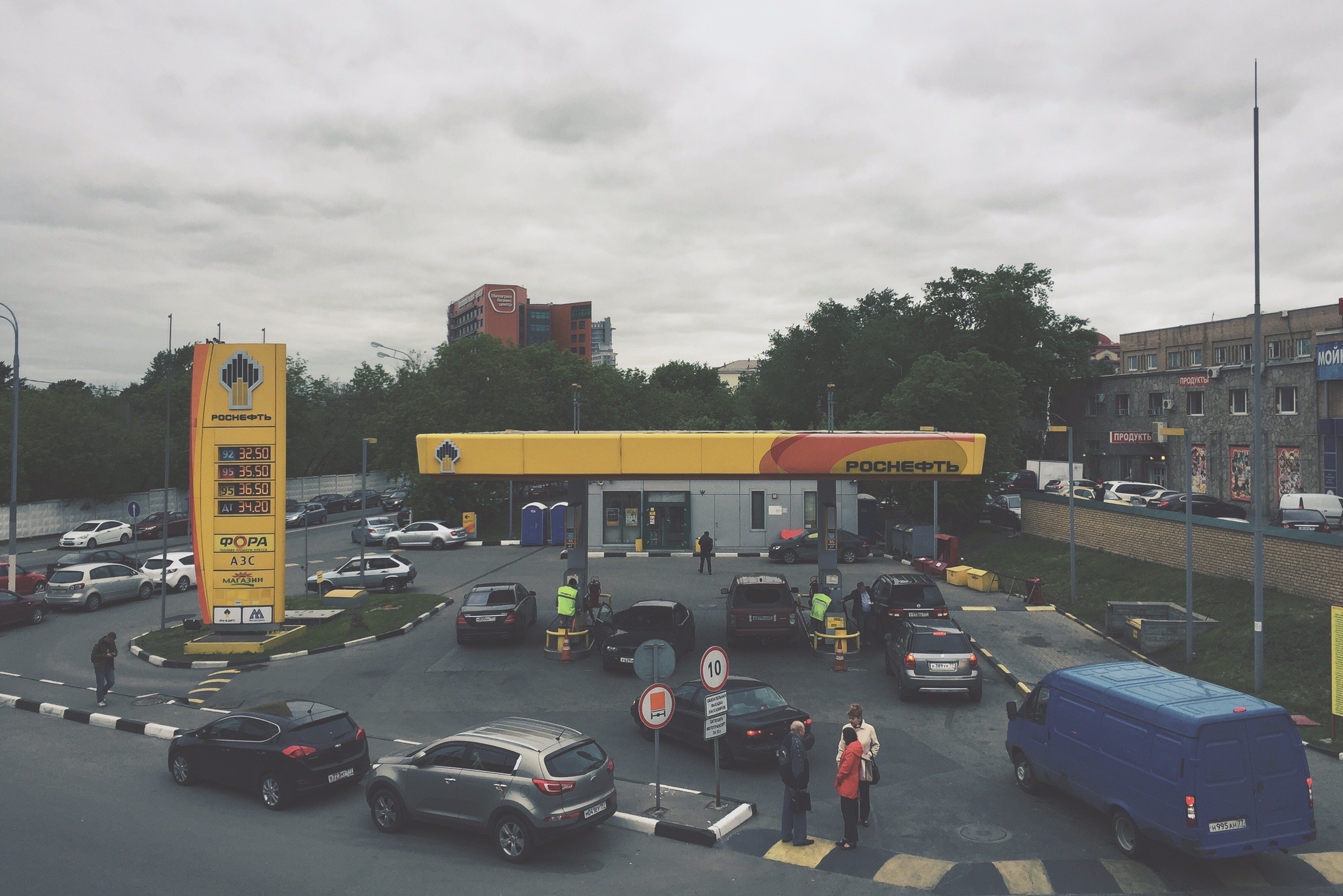
Rosneft filling station

Rosneft's daily average crude oil production in 2010 increased by 6.4%, to 2.3 million barrels (370 thousand cubic metres). Total crude oil output reached 847.4 million barrels (134.73 million cubic metres) of oil and gas condensate. Rosneft is also among the largest natural gas producers in Russia, with a total gas production of 12.3 billion cubic metres (1.23×10^{10} cubic metres) in 2010. Rosneft is engaged in exploration and production across all key oil and gas regions of Russia: Western Siberia, Southern and Central Russia, Timan-Pechora, Eastern Siberia, the Far East, and the shelf of Russia's Arctic Ocean. As of year-end 2010, Rosneft's total proved oil and gas reserves under PRMS classification were 22.8 billion barrels (3.62 billion cubic metres) of oil equivalent, among the highest for a publicly traded petroleum company worldwide. Rosneft is also second-to-none in terms of total proved liquid hydrocarbon reserves.

In 2016, based on geological prospecting, 13 oil fields and 127 new deposits with the reserves totaling 207 million tons of oil equivalent were discovered. The replacement of hydrocarbon reserves in industrial categories ABC1 amounted to 354 million TOE or 126% of Russia's production. The replacement factor for new reserves has been significantly above 100% for over ten years.

According to Rosneft, the reserves increment in Western Siberia amounted to 133 million tons of oil and condensate and 87 billion cubic metres (8.7×10^{10} cubic metres) of natural gas. 37 prospecting and exploration wells tests were completed with a success rate of 89%. 45 new deposits with the total reserve of 59 million tons of AB1С1 + В2С2 were discovered. In Eastern Siberia and the Far East, the total increase in reserves amounted to 21.2 million tons of oil and condensate and 29 billion cubic metres (2.9×10^{10} cubic metres) of gas. 11 exploration well tests were completed with a success rate of 55%. Five new deposits with reserves of 39 million tons of oil equivalent were discovered. In 2016, the total incremental 4.8 billion cubic metres (4.8×10^{9} cubic metres) of gas. 37 well tests were completed with a success rate of 76%.

Rosneft owns and operates seven large refineries in Russia with an aggregate annual capacity of 372 million barrels (59.1 million cubic metres) and four mini-refineries. The refineries can process about 45% of the crude oil produced by Rosneft as a whole. Rosneft owns a 50% stake in Ruhr Oel GmbH, which holds stakes in four refineries in Germany with an overall capacity of 23.2 million tonnes. A 54% stake in the PCK refinery in Schwedt was put into trusteeship by the German government in September 2022 as a result of the Russian attacks on Ukraine. In August 2024, it was revealed that Qatar was planning on purchasing Rosneft's stakes through negotiations held between the Secretary of State of the German Chancellery, Jörg Kukies, and the CEO of the Qatar Investment Authority, Mansoor Ebrahim Al-Mahmoud.

In September 2024, the German government announced it would extend the trusteeship until 10 March 2025, with the anticipation of a sale of assets to Qatar. Rosneft is the second largest national oil company by retail network, which covers 41 regions of Russia and includes 1,800 filling stations. In March 2020, the company stopped its operations in Venezuela. It sold all of its assets in the country to another unnamed company that the Russian government owns.

Rosneft owns several subsidiaries, among which is Rosneftflot, its sea transportation unit responsible for owning and managing vessels. By 2018, they had contracted 26 vessels, including 12 polar-capable oil tankers, with Zvezda Shipyard.

== Corporate affairs ==
=== Shareholders ===
Before the initial public offering (IPO) in 2006, all of Rosneft's shares were owned by the Russian government through its holding company JSC Rosneftegaz. After the company's shares were placed on the stock exchange and the consolidation of shares in 12 subsidiaries (including Yuganskneftegaz) of Rosneft, the share of Rosneftegaz decreased to 75.16%. As of September 2012, Rosneft had over 160,000 shareholders. By December 2016, the number of individual shareholders was 138,000, with Rosneftegaz owning only 50% of the shares, BP owning 19.75%, and 30.25% owned by other shareholders. In August 2021, Igor Sechin increased his own share at Rosneft from 0.1273% up to 0.1288%.

=== Management ===
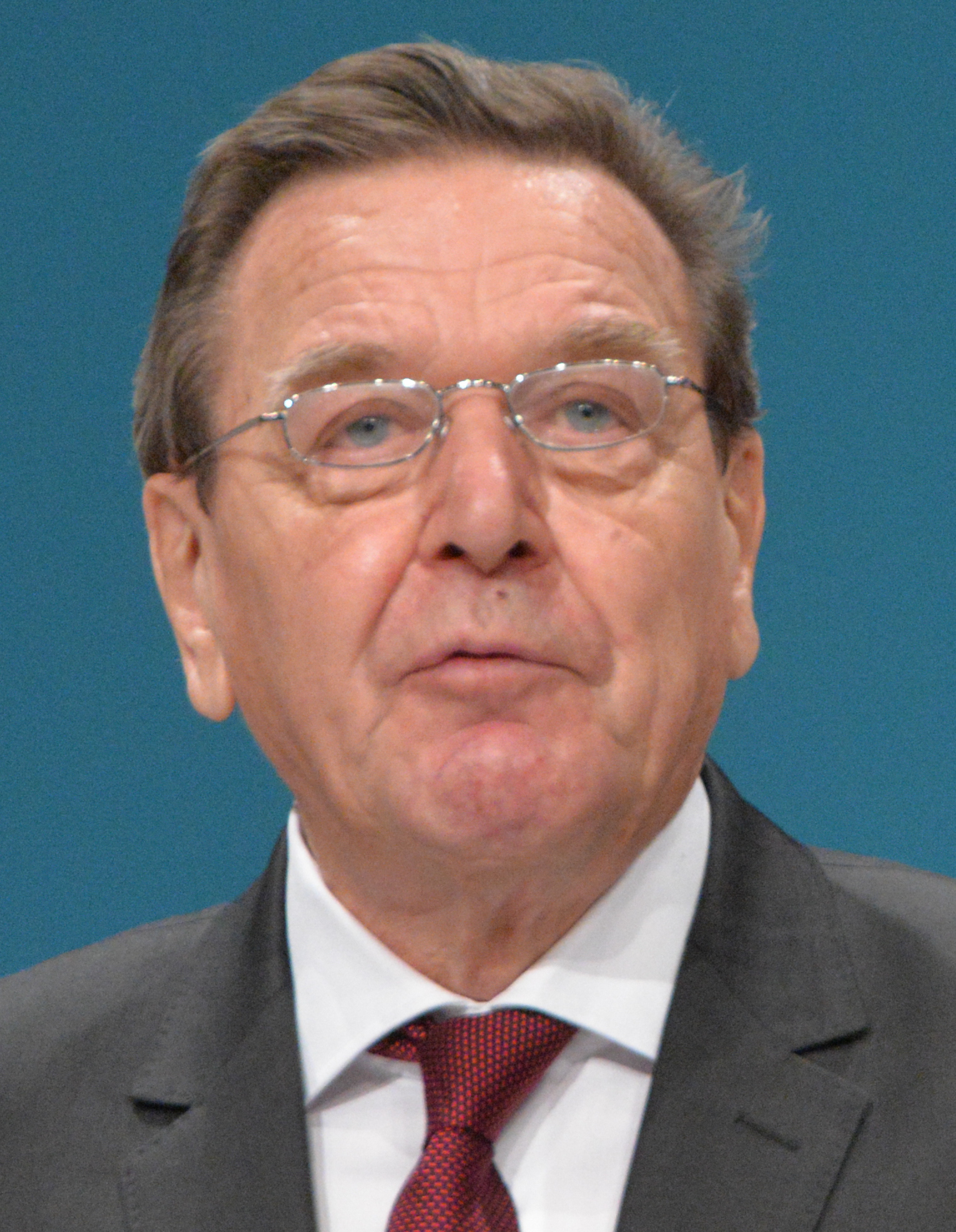
Gerhard Schröder: former German chancellor; he was also chairman of Rosneft until 2022 which brought some controversy in western countries as a result

==== Board of directors ====
Members of the board of directors (as of June 2022):

- Taieb Belmahdi – Chairman
- Igor Sechin – CEO, Deputy Chairman
- Aleksander Nekipelov – Deputy Chairman, Independent director
- Andrey Akimov
- Hamad Rashid Al-Mohannadi
- Faisal Alsuwaidi
- Pedro А. Aquino, Jr.
- Vladimir Litvinenko
- Alexander Novak
- Maxim Oreshkin
- Aleksandr Uss

==== Management board ====
Members of the management board:

- Igor Sechin – CEO, Chairman
- Yuri Kalinin – Deputy Chairman, Vice President
- Eric M. Liron – First Vice President
- Gennady Bukaev – Vice President, Head of Internal Audit
- Didier Casimiro – Vice President for Refining, Petrochemical, Commerce, and Logistics
- Peter Lazarev – Financial director
- Yury Narushevich – Vice President for Internal Services
- Zeljko Runje – Vice President for Offshore Projects
- Yuri Kurilin – Vice President, Chief of Staff
- Andrey Shishkin – Vice President for Energy, Localization, and Innovation

=== Social policy ===
In 2011, according to Rosneft, the company had donated $422 million to charity, 4 times that of the previous year, becoming the leading Russian company devoted to philanthropy that year. At the same time, the composition of the beneficiaries was not disclosed as it was known that the oil company had previously committed to pay $180 million for the right to be the general sponsor of the 2014 Winter Olympics in Sochi.

Since 2012, Rosneft, along with Gazprom, has been the title sponsor of the association football team FC Tom Tomsk based in Tomsk. Rosneft has been ranked as among the 13th best of 92 oil, gas, and mining companies on indigenous rights and resource extraction in the Arctic.

== Controversies ==
=== Violations of anti-monopoly legislation ===
In October 2009, the Federal Antimonopoly Service (FAS) imposed on Rosneft a record fine of ₽5.3 billion ($175M) for violating anti-monopoly legislation. The fine was imposed for the abuse of power in the petroleum market recorded in the first half of 2009, which was expressed in the "seizure of goods from circulation, which led to higher prices in the wholesale segment of the oil products market, creating discriminatory conditions for the sale of oil products to individual counter-parties." As FAS has calculated, these actions led to an increase in prices in the wholesale markets of motor gasoline, diesel fuel, and aviation kerosene in the first half of 2009.

=== Western claims from Yukos Capital ===
On 9 August 2010, a former subsidiary of Yukos, Yukos Capital Sarl of Luxembourg, was seeking to have Rosneft repay the debts of companies that previously belonged to Yukos. After the seizure of Rosneft's assets in the United Kingdom and the denial of an appeal by the Supreme Court of the Netherlands, Rosneft said that Yukos Capital paid Yuganskneftegaz its debt of ₽12.9 billion ($426M).

On 16 August 2010, Yukos Capital appealed to the Federal Arbitration Court of the West Siberian District with a cassation appeal against the decision of the Arbitration Court of Tomsk Oblast to refuse to reclaim from Tomskneft, a Rosneft subsidiary, more than ₽7 billion ($231M) under loan agreements. Previously, Yukos Capital applied to international arbitration under the International Chamber of Commerce. It obliged Tomskneft to pay ₽7,254.2 million ($239M), $275,200, and £52,960, with an interest rate of 9% per annum for the amount of ₽4,350 million ($144M), starting from 12 February 2009 until the day of payment of the debt. The Russian court had to enforce its decision within Russian territory. However, the Arbitration Court of Tomsk Oblast, having considered the claim, ruled to refuse Yukos Capital in its debt collection efforts.

=== Ulyukayev lawsuit ===
On 15 December 2017, a Moscow court sentenced Alexei Ulyukayev, a former Russian economy minister, to pay ₽130M ($2.2M) and eight years in a penal colony for bribery and corruption. The case was widely seen as Rosneft CEO Sechin’s revenge for Ulyukayev opposing Rosneft’s takeover of Bashneft, another oil company. The 61-year-old claimed that Sechin had lured him to Rosneft's offices, where he was subsequently caught red-handed by the authorities with a bag of bribe money. According to investigators, Ulyukayev, who was still economy minister at the time of his arrest, had taken the $2M bribe in exchange for permitting Rosneft's acquisition of a stake in Bashneft. Ulyukayev retorted that the "fabricated" accusations of bribery were "based solely on Sechin's claims," and that the whole exchange had been engineered by the Russian Federal Security Service, the successor of the KGB.

Ulyukayev was seen as an economic liberal, and Igor Sechin is viewed as a hawk who supports greater state control over the economy. Ulyukayev, while influential, was not part of President Putin's inner circle.

=== Oil spills ===
The Russian branch of Greenpeace called Rosneft the dirtiest oil company in the world. In 2011, according to a survey conducted by the Federal Service for Supervision in the Sphere of Nature Management (Rosprirodnadzor) in Khanty-Mansi Autonomous Okrug, Rosneft was responsible for 2,727 oil spills, which accounted for 75% of the total number of spills that occurred under the company. According to environmentalists, it is Rosneft's fault that more than 10,000 oil spills occur each year. The Hydrometeorological Centre of Russia has estimated that 4.5m tonnes of oil are spilled on the Russian mainland every year, that's seven times the Deepwater Horizon oil spill in the Gulf of Mexico in 2010. Often blamed is Rosneft's ageing infrastructure, as well as the lack of government oversight. As a result of the environmental contamination, people have observed black water coming out of their taps, cattle have been stricken with tuberculosis, and fish have been found deformed.

=== Fracking ===
In the first half of the 2000s, Sergei Bogdanchikov, then president of Rosneft, along with some journalists and experts, criticized Yukos and Sibneft for their use of hydraulic fracturing. However, in early November 2006, several journalists pointed out that the Priobskoye oil field of which it is owned by RN-Yuganskneftegaz, a subsidiary of Rosneft acquired from Yukos, produced the largest oil fracture in Russia with specialists of Newco Well Service. The operation was conducted for seven hours and was broadcast live via the Internet to the office of Yuganskneftegaz. In 2007, the company planned to perform hydraulic fracturing of the formation at 440 wells. From 2009 to 2010, Rosneft was one of the largest customers of the oilfield services company Schlumberger, which specializes in hydraulic fracturing.

=== Sanctions ===
On 20 March 2014, the United States government sanctioned Rosneft CEO Igor Sechin in response to the Russian government's role in the unrest in Ukraine. The sanctions include a travel ban to the United States, freezing of all assets of Sechin in the United States and a ban on business transactions between American citizens and corporations and Sechin and businesses he owns. On 24 February 2022, his son Ivan Sechin was also sanctioned by the U.S. On 28 February 2022, Igor Sechin was subjected to travel restrictions and had his assets frozen by the EU.

Rosneft and many of its subsidiaries have been sanctioned in the past and appear on the Sectoral Sanctions Identification (SSI) List. Rosneft was added to the SSI on 16 July 2014, and was sanctioned by the EU on 8 September 2014.

On 18 February 2020, the US Department of the Treasury's Office of Foreign Assets Control (OFAC) added Rosneft Trading S.A., a Swiss subsidiary of Rosneft, and its president Didier Casimiro to the Specially Designated Nationals and Blocked Persons List (SDN).

On 22 October 2025, the U.S. imposed further sanctions on Rosneft.

=== Transparency ===
As of 1 May 2014, the heads of Russian state corporations provided information about their incomes and property to the Russian government to correspond to the presidential decree Anti-Corruption Issues, which was published on 8 July 2013. According to the ruling, the websites of the companies should display the personal information of their top managers, including income, property, spouses, and children. However, Rosneft refused to publish its information on top managers, citing that it is only applicable to "state companies (corporations) and other organizations created by federal laws," to which it does not believe itself to be. However, this did not prevent the company from providing information regarding the incomes and property of Rosneft's top managers and their relatives to "competent authorities" in the prescribed "time and amount". According to the director of the Russian branch of Transparency International, Elena Panfilova, improvement of such legislation is necessary so that state corporations can unequivocally interpret the norm on the publication of personal information. In July, the Russian government announced that details of the income of top management of companies listed in Government Decree No. 613 22 July 2013 which includes Rosneft, "are subject to placement in the information and telecommunications network 'Internet' on the official websites of these organizations."

== See also ==
- List of countries by oil exports
- List of countries by oil production
- List of countries by natural gas exports
- List of companies of Russia
- List of oil exploration and production companies
- Petroleum industry in Russia
