= Billion Dollar Spy (film) =

Upcoming spy film

- Directed by: Amma Asante
- Screenplay by: Stephen Gaghan; Ben August
- Based on: The Billion Dollar Spy by David E. Hoffman
- Produced by: Frank Smith; Benjamin Tappan; Cher Hawrysh; Akiva Goldsman; Greg Lessans
- Starring: Russell Crowe; Harry Lawtey; Vera Farmiga; Tony Goldwyn; Willa Fitzgerald; Rufus Sewell; Justin Theroux
- Cinematography: Hagen Bogdanski
- Edited by: Laura Jennings
- Production companies: Walden Media; Weed Road Pictures; Pioneer Stillking Films; HanWay Films
- Distributed by: HanWay Films
- Countries: United Kingdom; United States
- Language: English

Billion Dollar Spy is an upcoming spy thriller film directed by Amma Asante and written by Stephen Gaghan and Ben August. It is based on the 2015 non-fiction book The Billion Dollar Spy by David E. Hoffman, and stars Russell Crowe as the titular spy, alongside Harry Lawtey, Vera Farmiga, Tony Goldwyn, Willa Fitzgerald, Rufus Sewell, and Justin Theroux.

== Cast ==
- Russell Crowe as Adolf Tolkachev
- Harry Lawtey as Tom Lenihan
- Vera Farmiga as Natasha Tolkachev
- Tony Goldwyn as Burton Gerber
- Willa Fitzgerald as Mae Lenihan
- Rufus Sewell as Gus Hathaway
- Justin Theroux as Van Spencer
- Tennyson Crowe as Sasha Tolkachev
- Claes Bang

== Production ==
In October 2020, it was announced that Amma Asante would direct a film adaptation of the novel The Billion Dollar Spy, with a screenplay by Ben August and Stephen Gaghan and with Mads Mikkelsen and Armie Hammer attached to co-star in the film. In the wake of sexual and emotional abuse allegations, including a sexual assault investigation, Hammer was fired from the project in March 2021 - effectively halting the project. In March 2025, Russell Crowe (replacing Mikkelsen), Harry Lawtey (replacing Hammer), and Willa Fitzgerald joining the cast. In April 2025, the rest of the cast was announced, along with the fact that principal photography began in Budapest. In May, Claes Bang joined the cast.
