= Dimitry Vasiliev =

Russian politician and bureaucrat

Dimitry Vasiliev is a Russian politician and bureaucrat who was involved in the privatization of the Russian Economy in the 1990s.

== Background ==
Prior to his involvement in the privatization of Russia's economy, Vasiliev was a scholar-in-residence and co-chair of the Corruption and State Reform Program at the Carnegie Moscow Center.

== Involvement in privatization of Russian economy ==
Vasiliev was heavily involved in the reconstruction of the Russian economy after the communist party lost power 1991. Vasiliev held many positions within the bureaucracy created during this time. He was the deputy chairman of the Federal Agency for State Property Management and the Russian Privatization Center's board of directors. He was also the first Chairman of Russia's Federal Commission of Securities Market (FCSM) as well as the executive director from 1996 to 1999. At FCSM he blocked Sidanco, a Siberian oil company, from diluting its shares in response to a complaint by American investment manager Bill Browder.

He was also an important figure in the First Russian Specialized Depository, The Harvard Institute for International Development, and the Gore-Chernomyrdin Commission.

Vasiliev actively campaigned for the rights of investors in Russia during this period. After participating in the creation of the FCSM, he steered its activities toward upholding investor interests. Vasiliev's activities may have been motivated at least in part by self-interest as he also held a role during this time as the deputy chair of CROC Incorporated, a leading Russian information technology service provider.

== Current occupation ==
Today, Dmitry Vasiliev is serving as the co-founder and executive director of the Institute of Corporate Law and Corporate Governance, which was created in June 2000. He previously served on the Board of Governors, the highest collective management body. He is also the General Director of Trans-Siberian Gold Management.
