= Pavel Fradkov =

Russian government official

- Павел Михайлович Фрадков
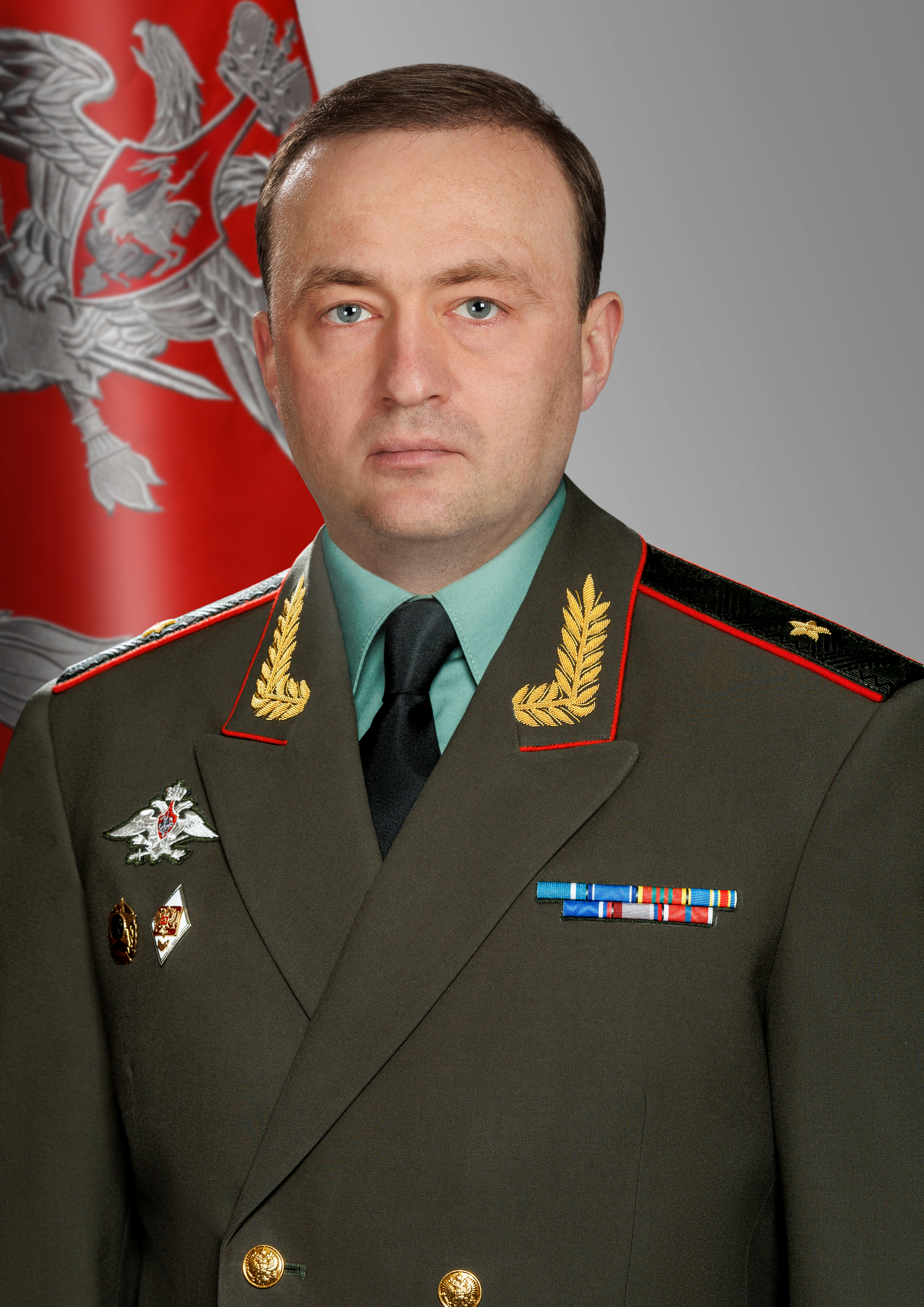

Deputy Minister of Defense of Russia
- Incumbent
- Assumed office 17 June 2024

Personal details
- Born: 3 September 1981 (age 45) Moscow, Soviet Union
- Parent: Mikhail Fradkov (father)
- Education: Moscow Suvorov Military School; FSB Academy; Russian MFA Diplomatic Academy
- Profession: Economist, jurist

Pavel Mikhailovich Fradkov (Russian: Павел Миха́йлович Фрадков) is a Russian government official serving as a deputy head of the Presidential Administration of Russia. In June 2024, he was appointed as the Deputy Minister of Defence of the Russian Federation (Responsible for the Development of the Technical Basis for the Management System and Information Technology) and 1st class Active State Councillor of the Russian Federation.

== Life ==
Pavel M. Fradkov is the youngest son of Mikhail Fradkov. He entered the Saint Petersburg Suvorov Military School in 1995, then transferred to Moscow's Suvorov and graduated from the Moscow Suvorov Military School in 1998. He studied law at the FSB Academy with Andrey Patrushev who is the son of Nikolai Patrushev, graduated in 2003, and then attended and graduated from the Diplomatic Academy of the Ministry of Foreign Affairs of the Russian Federation.

In 2005, Fradkov joined the Ministry of Foreign Affairs of Russia as the third secretary in the department of pan-European cooperation. He later worked Federal Security Service overseeing the credit and financial sector.

In the summer of 2012, upon the invitation of Olga Dergunova, Fradkov joined the Federal Agency for State Property Management the deputy. He oversaw three departments, legal, administrative, and the federal property valuation organization. On May 21, 2015, Vladimir Putin appointed Fradkov as a deputy head of the Presidential Administration of Russia. Fradkov was one of three deputies of the head of the presidential affairs, Alexander Kolpakov. Fradkov was reportedly promoted to Major General in early December 2024 and Putin will "almost certainly" promote Fradkov to Lieutenant general within 6 months. MOD officials and high level Kremlin leaders view Fradkov as a promising future leader and praised his ability to solve battlefield problems.
