= Alfred Koch =

Russian writer, mathematician-economist, and businessman

- Альфред Кох
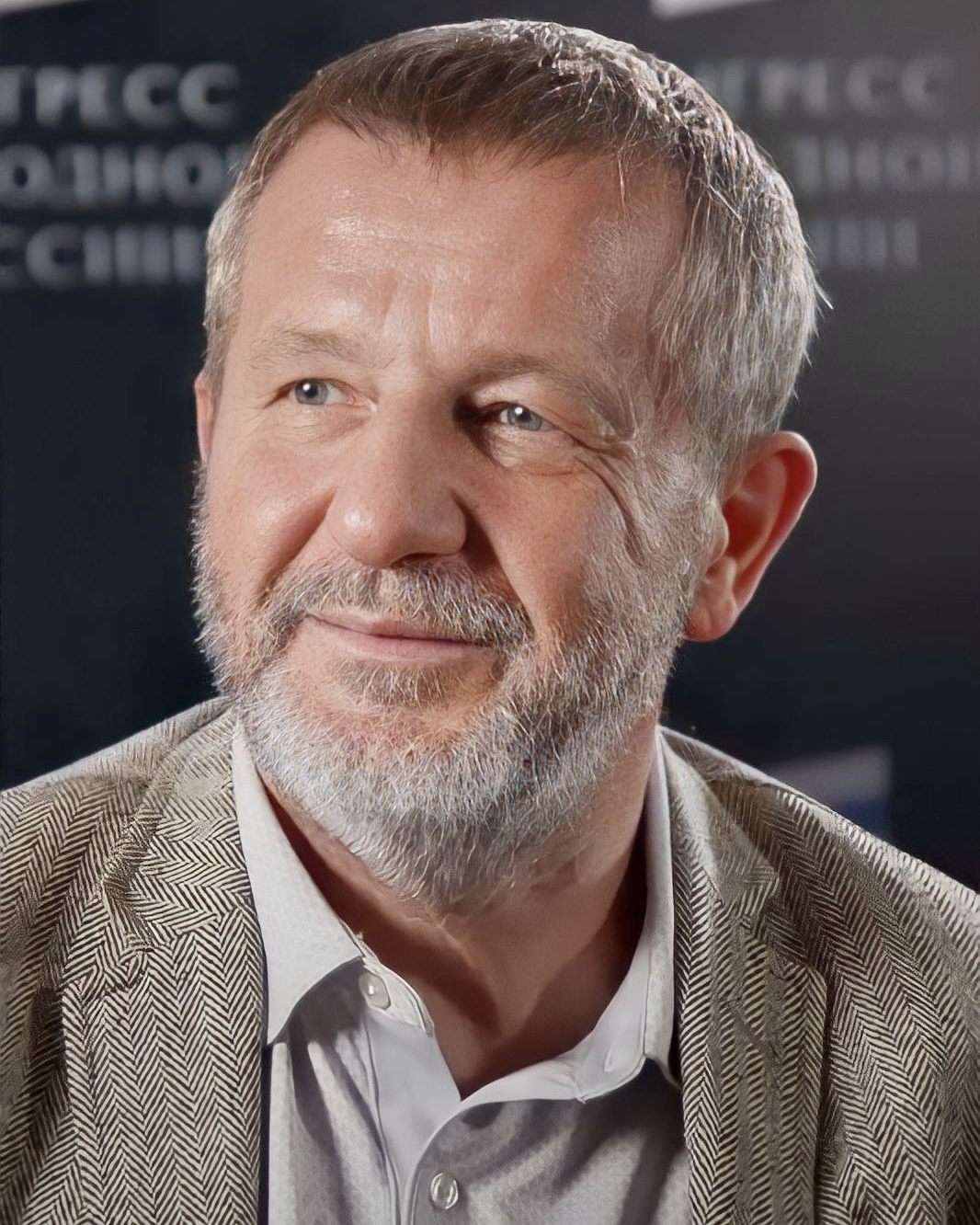
- Koch in 2022

Member of the Federation Council from Leningrad Oblast
- In office 26 February – 23 April 2002
- Preceded by: Vitaly Klimov
- Succeeded by: Valery Golubev

Deputy Prime Minister of Russia
- In office 17 March – 13 August 1997
- Prime Minister: Viktor Chernomyrdin

Chairman of the State Committee for State Property Management
- In office 12 September 1996 – 13 August 1997
- President: Boris Yeltsin
- Prime Minister: Viktor Chernomyrdin
- Preceded by: Alexander Kazakov
- Succeeded by: Maxim Boyko

Personal details
- Born: Alfred Reingoldovich Koch; 28 February 1961 (age 65) Zyryanovsk, Kazakh SSR, Soviet Union (now Altai, Kazakhstan)
- Children: 3, including Olga
- Education: Saint Petersburg State University of Economics
- Occupation: Statesman, mathematician-economist and businessman
- Profession: Politician; Mathematician-Economist; Business executive
- Awards: Letter of Gratitude from the President of the Russian Federation

Alfred Reingoldovich Koch (Kokh) (Russian: Альфред Рейнгольдович Кох, German: Alfred Reingoldowitsch Koch, born 28 February 1961) is a Russian writer, mathematician-economist, businessman, and former statesman. From 12 September 1996 to 13 August 1997 and from 17 March 1997 to 13 August 1997, he was the head of the State Committee for State Property Management (now Federal Agency for State Property Management) and a deputy prime minister under Prime Minister Viktor Chernomyrdin, respectively.

== Education and early life ==
He was born in Zyryanovsk, East Kazakhstan Region in the Kazakh Soviet Socialist Republic to an ethnically German father, Reingold Davydovich Koch, who had been deported to Kazakhstan in 1941 under Stalin's wartime policies targeting ethnic Germans, and an ethnic Russian mother. At the age of eight, Koch moved with his parents to Tolyatti, where his father found work at the Volzhsky Automobile Plant then under construction, becoming the head of the department of related industries. He graduated from the Leningrad Financial-Economic Institute (now Saint Petersburg State University of Economics) in 1983 with a degree in economic cybernetics.

== Career ==
He served as a deputy prime minister under President Boris Yeltsin and was an ally of economic reformer Anatoly Chubais, a chief architect of Russia's privatization. On 12 September 1996, Koch was appointed head of Russia's State Property Committee, acting as Russia's privatization chief. He left the position on 13 August 1997, after the privatization auctions (loans-for-shares).

In June 2000, Koch became head of Gazprom-Media, a subsidiary media holding of Gazprom (now a subsidiary holding of Gazprombank). He oversaw the gas giant's controversial takeover of NTV, an independent television company owned by Vladimir Gusinsky, on which he hosted the game show Алчность, the Russian version of Greed. As Gazprom-Media's general director, Koch was installed as chairman of NTV's board of directors after a contested shareholders' meeting on 3 April 2001 that ousted the network's existing management, with American financier Boris Jordan appointed as NTV's general director.

He was succeeded by Boris Jordan on 16 October 2001. He also served as head of the 2003 election campaign staff for the Union of Right Forces, a pro-business, democratic party of young reformers including Yegor Gaidar, Boris Nemtsov and Irina Khakamada, the first woman to run for the Russian presidency.

He wrote the 2006 Russian book A Crate of Vodka (Ящик водки), a dialogue with journalist Igor Svinarenko about the twenty-year period that covered the last Soviet generation and the first, free Russian generation (1982, the death of Leonid Brezhnev, to 2001, when 9/11 put an end to liberal politics). The English translation appeared in spring 2009.

In 2008, he financed a scholarly point-by-point refutation of Holocaust denial materials. Denial of the Denial (Отрицание отрицания), with Pavel Polian, is the first book on the subject published in Russia.

Koch is a frequent commentator in Medved, a glossy Russian men's magazine, writing about history and travel.

Koch was a sponsor of the new monument in Moscow to Tsar Alexander II, the leader who emancipated the serfs and reformed the Russian army. Out of fear of persecution by the Russian authorities he fled to Germany in June 2014. He lives on Lake Chiemsee in Rosenheim, Bavaria. In 2016, he was arrested in absentia on charges of smuggling cultural property after he attempted to leave Russia with a painting whose value was disputed by customs officials.

He has been a critic of Joe Biden.

== Personal life ==
His daughter Olga (born 1992), St Petersburg is a stand-up comedian living in London.

Preceded by Alexander Kazakov	Head of the Russian State Property Committee; September 12, 1996, – August 13, 1997	Succeeded by Maxim Boyko
