= Alexander Kazakov (politician) =

Russian politician and economist

- Александр Казаков
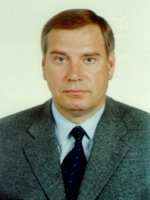

Russian Federation Senator from Rostov Oblast
- In office 21 December 2001 – 26 December 2005
- Preceded by: Alexander Popov
- Succeeded by: Leonid Tyagachyov

Deputy Prime Minister — Chairman of the State Property Committee
- In office 25 January – 19 July 1996
- President: Boris Yeltsin
- Prime Minister: Viktor Chernomyrdin
- Preceded by: Sergey Belyaev
- Succeeded by: Alfred Kokh

Personal details
- Born: May 24, 1948 (age 77) Moscow, Russian SFSR, Soviet Union
- Profession: Economist; Business executive

Alexander Ivanovich Kazakov (Russian: Александр Иванович Казаков; born 24 May 1948) is a Russian politician and economist who held a number of senior government posts during the presidency of Boris Yeltsin, including deputy chief of the presidential administration and Deputy Prime Minister. He was among the officials in charge of overseeing the privatization of the Russian economy in the 1990s, being the head of the State Property Committee. Kazakov was also an associate of Anatoly Chubais. He has the federal state civilian service rank of 1st class Active State Councillor of the Russian Federation.

== Biography ==
Under the Soviet Union, Kazakov worked in Gosplan, the economic planning agency of the USSR, until 1992. During his service in the Russian government, Kazakov was deputy chairman of the property commission under Anatoly Chubais in 1993–1994 before becoming part of President Boris Yeltsin's administration as the head of the department working with regional bureaucracies. In January 1996, President Yeltsin appointed Kazakov to the post of chairman of the State Property Committee and also one of the Deputy Chairmen of Government of the Russian Federation. In his new position, Kazakov was largely carrying out the policies favored by Chubais, being expected to continue them rather than make major changes.

He also worked as an official at Gazprom during the 1990s.

== Sources ==
=== Books ===
- Böhme, Dimo (2011). EU-Russia Energy Relations: What Chance for Solutions? Focus on the Natural Gas Sector. University of Potsdam. ISBN 978-3869561202.
