= Oligarch =

Oligarch may refer to:

== Authority ==
- Oligarch, a member of an oligarchy, a power structure where control resides in a small number of people
- Oligarch (Kingdom of Hungary), late 13th–14th centuries
- Business oligarch, wealthy and influential magnate
  - Russian oligarchs, business oligarchs in the era of Russian privatization in the 1990s
  - Ukrainian oligarchs, business oligarchs after Ukrainian independence in 1991

== See also ==
- The Oligarchs, a 2001 non-fiction book by David E. Hoffman
- Oligarch planet, hypothetical planets beyond Neptune
- Old Oligarch, author of a "Constitution of the Athenians"
