= Bakhtiyor Islamov =

Uzbek diplomat and scholar

Bakhtiyor Anvarovich Islamov (Russian: Бахтиёр Анварович Исламов, Uzbek: Baxtiyor Anvarovich Islomov; born on January 6, 1954) is a prominent Uzbek scholar, diplomat and politician.

Islamov was appointed as the Ambassador Extraordinary and Plenipotentiary of Uzbekistan to Russia and Belarus in 2003.

He was appointed in December 2008 as Uzbekistan's Deputy Foreign Minister, and in March 2010 also became the representative of Central Asia in the CIS and the EU. He resigned from his ministerial post in January 2012 and became a private citizen. Since February 2012, he has worked as a professor at the Tashkent Branch of the Plekhanov Russian University of Economics, as well as a professor at the Slavic Research Center at Hokkaido University in Sapporo.

== Books ==
- Central Asian States Ten Years After: How to Overcome Traps of Development Transformation and Globalization (2001)

== See also ==
- Russia–Uzbekistan relations
