= Graduate School of Management =

Graduate School of Management may refer to:

- Graduate School of Management, University of California, Davis
- Graduate School of Management, University of Dallas, USA
- Graduate School of Management, St. Petersburg State University, Russia
