= MITIM =

MITIM may refer to:

- Man in the Iron Mask, a name given to a prisoner arrested as Eustache Dauger in 1669, and held in a number of jails
- Master in International Technology & Innovation Management, a master's degree offered at:
  - Graduate School of Management (St. Petersburg State University)
  - Lappeenranta University of Technology
