= Adolf Tolkachev =

Soviet engineer and CIA spy (1927–1986)

- Born: Adolf Georgiyevich Tolkachev; 6 January 1927; Aktyubinsk, Aktobe Region, Kazakh SSR, USSR
- Died: 24 September 1986 (aged 59); Soviet Union
- Cause of death: Execution by shooting
- Other names: Adik, CKSPHERE, GTVANQUISH
- Citizenship: USSR
- Education: Kharkiv Polytechnic Institute
- Occupations: Electronic engineer, spy
- Spouse: Natalia Tolkacheva
- Children: 1

Adolf Georgiyevich Tolkachev (Russian: Адольф Георгиевич Толкачёв; 6 January 1927 – 24 September 1986) was a Soviet electronics engineer. He provided vital documents to the United States Central Intelligence Agency (CIA) from 1979 to 1985. Working at the Soviet radar design bureau Phazotron as one of the chief designers, Adolf Tolkachev gave the CIA complete detailed information about projects such as the R-23, R-24, R-33, R-27, and R-60, S-300 missile systems; fighter-interceptor aircraft radars used on the MiG-29, MiG-31, and Su-27; and other avionics. The KGB executed him in Moscow for espionage in 1986.

== Career ==
Tolkachev said his distrust of the Soviet government arose from the persecution of his wife's parents under Joseph Stalin. He told the CIA he was inspired by Aleksandr Solzhenitsyn and Andrei Sakharov.

A story whose plausibility has been questioned tells how Tolkachev began his spy career. From January 1977 to February 1978, Tolkachev attempted to approach cars with U.S. diplomatic license plates in Moscow five times, coincidentally approaching the CIA Moscow bureau chief Gardner Hathaway at a gas station, but the CIA was wary of counterintelligence operations by the KGB. On his fifth attempt, the CIA assigned a Russian-speaking officer named John I. Guilsher to contact him. Eventually, Tolkachev established his bona fides with intelligence data that proved to be of "incalculable" value to US experts. The U.S. Air Force completely reversed direction on a $70 million electronics package for the F-15 Eagle due to Tolkachev's intelligence, although historian Benjamin B. Fischer says that this was "the projected overall cost, not a cost savings".

Tolkachev resisted the use of traditional CIA methods, including dead drops and radios. He preferred personal meetings, as he enjoyed meeting with agents. During visits, he was also given medicine and medical checkups. A KGB-linked newspaper later wrote that the CIA showed a great deal of care for Tolkachev and that the way they treated him was "touching."

Tolkachev found that many of the procedures provided by the CIA were ineffective and risked giving him away. Tolkachev developed many different ways to bypass Soviet security despite routine changes that interfered with his activities. He repeatedly found holes in security, finding ways to check out documents without leaving a record and finding ways to take documents home or to areas of the facility where he had access to better light and more privacy. When the CIA-provided cameras failed to work, Tolkachev devised a way to use a civilian camera instead. He developed his own procedures that greatly increased the output and quality of his work. In one meeting alone, he provided almost 200 rolls of film and over 150 rolls in another meeting. He also included detailed notes and explanations of the information within the photos to assist in understanding the documents.

Tolkachev initially refused any payments for his service, knowing they would draw suspicion. He requested art supplies, music, and other items for his son. Because he would not take payments himself, token payments were deposited in an overseas account as a sign of gratitude. Tolkachev refused to leave the Soviet Union because his wife believed she would become homesick. He eventually requested that the interest from his accounts be paid to him in rubles so that he could attempt to bribe any coworkers who might discover his activity. In case he could not bribe his way out of a situation, Tolkachev requested a cyanide pill to commit suicide in case he was captured and to limit the information the KGB could acquire from interrogating him. The payments were made despite Tolkachev knowing that he would never be able to access the remaining funds. He went beyond anything required by his payment agreement and provided information any time it became available to him, not only when he was scheduled to receive compensation or care.

== Compromise and arrest ==
At some point in 1985, Tolkachev was compromised. While attempting to meet with Tolkachev, a CIA officer was arrested and questioned at the Lubyanka KGB headquarters and prison, and incriminating materials, including spy equipment such as cameras, were seized from him. The source of the exposure is believed to have been Edward Lee Howard, an ex-CIA officer who fled to Moscow to avoid treason charges. Aldrich Ames apparently also passed his name to the Soviets.

Tolkachev was arrested by the KGB while returning to Moscow from the countryside and was later put on trial and executed. With much planning over the years, Tolkachev had carefully compartmentalized his spy work from his family; however, his wife Natalia was also imprisoned for three years in 1986 on charges of supporting high treason.

The arrest of Tolkachev, commanded by KGB Lt. Colonel Vladimir Zaitsev, was carried out by the KGB's Alpha spetsnaz group. Zaitsev also says that the KGB kept Tolkachev's arrest secret in order to feed the CIA misinformation over the course of 10 months.

== Legacy ==
A painting of Tolkachev by Kathy Krantz Fieramosca hangs in the CIA's Langley headquarters. Writer David E. Hoffman published The Billion Dollar Spy, about Tolkachev's life, in 2015.

== Skepticism ==
Benjamin B. Fischer, the former chief historian of the CIA, has presented a contrary view of the Tolkachev case. He argues that:

- Since Tolkachev "made no less than six or seven attempts to contact the [CIA] Moscow Station," including senior CIA officials, it is implausible that the KGB did not detect him. This ignores that he only asked if agents were American, then dropped notes for them.
- Tolkachev claimed that he took documents home to photograph them during lunch, but traveling by means of public transit would have taken about an hour. This ignores both that it was standard procedure for employees to leave during lunch to carry out errands and that Tolkachev was unable to continue using his home to collect intelligence, instead finding bathrooms and other locations in the facility where he could take pictures in privacy.
- Since Tolkachev claimed to be asking for documents that were outside his area of work or security clearance, then he would not be able to obtain them without arousing suspicion in the secure, KGB-guarded facility. This ignores that Tolkachev raised these concerns and that Tolkachev replaced the card used for keeping records of his book withdrawals, and that no system existed for the KGB to filter document withdrawals by subject.

Fischer also questions the value of the intelligence furnished by Tolkachev, asserting that since CIA HUMINT only constituted "one small ingredient" of the Pentagon's decision-making process, Tolkachev cannot be credited with saving billions of dollars. He concludes that Tolkachev was a "dangle" agent run by the KGB to obtain CIA technical equipment such as spy cameras, project a false image of Soviet military and economic vitality, and absorb the CIA in a resource- and time-consuming operation.

However, contradicting Fischer's assertions, the Soviet Politburo discussed Tolkachev on 25 September 1986, and top Soviet officials stated that he "was caught with two million rubles" and "handed over very important military-technical secrets to the enemy". The conversation transcript states that Tolkachev had been executed the previous day for his espionage on behalf of the U.S. Historian Nicholas Dujmovic criticized Fischer's article as "speculative," saying that he makes "few factual statements". Hoffman rebutted Fischer's theory, reasserting that Tolkachev furnished genuine technical information. Fischer responded that the CIA had not released the intelligence provided by Tolkachev; that the Politburo transcript is "suspicious" and possibly falsified; and that the KGB, which ran other "dangles" providing intelligence on Soviet weapons technologies, was also in control of Tolkachev.
