= Federal Commission of Securities Market of Russia =

Russian government body which regulates securities

The Federal Commission on Securities Market (FCSM) of Russia oversees the Russian securities market. By regulating the securities market, investors are protected and have freedom to participate in the market. The main concern of the FCSM is “improving corporate governance of Russian companies, promoting their transition to international financial reporting standards, development of the institution of collective investment, particularly mutual funds, tax optimization, investors and market participants”. FCSM also strives to prevent the manipulation of prices and insider information

== Members ==
There are 11 members in the Federal Commission on Securities Market of Russia.

- Igor Kostikov Russia – Chairman of Russia’s FCSM
- Gennady Kolesnikov Isaakovich – First Deputy Chairman
- Zuev Tsiolkovsky – State Secretary, Deputy Chairman
- Kataev Elena – Deputy Chairman
- Nadezhda Zakharova – Secretary of the Russian Federal Securities Commission
- Glazunov Dmitry - Russian Federal Securities Commission member
- Pleshakov Alexander - Member of the Russian Federal Securities Commission
- Sharonov Alexey – Member of the FCSM of Russia
- Sergei Kharlamov - member of the Russian Federal Securities Commission
- Profatilov Sergey - member of the Russian Federal Securities Commission

== History ==
The Russian Federal Securities Commission started circa 1993 under the President of the Russian Federation. On July 1, 1996, it was completely restructured as the Federal Commission on Securities Market, which is what it is known as today. From that point on, various resolutions were made to further assert its strength and the safety of financiers. In the early 1990s, Anatoly Chubais was put in charge of privatization in Russia. The purpose of these efforts was to attempt to remove power from the Communist Party. Dmitry Vassiliev was chosen by Chubais to spearhead the management of the privatization efforts. During the process, Chubais agreed to give up to 40% of the privatized initiatives to the manager of the initiative in order to attract people to the privatization efforts. Chubais also had a back-up plan which allowed those managers and workers to purchase 51% of their initiative at a reduced cost. The only issue was that privatization required the purchase of ownership shares and not many people had the funds to be able to make those purchases due to inflation. To combat this issue, Chubais created vouchers but there was another issue that arose. Although there was much support from the public for privatization, there were no state initiatives that wanted to be privatized. Soon after the privatization of the Bolshevik Biscuit Factory, Yegor Gaidar was replaced as prime minister by Viktor Chernomyrdin who considered the prior attempts at privatization to be criminal acts. Despite Chernomyrdin's claims, privatization continued to progress and about 2/3 of the initiatives were privatized by 1994. Although privatization did remove power from the Communist Party, millions of Russians were impoverished while a small number of Russians became very wealth. Today, the beneficiaries of the Russian privatization efforts are commonly referred to as oligarchs.

== Organizational structure ==
There are 7 different districts of the Federal Commission on Securities Market of Russia and within these districts, there are 8 regional offices

1. Central Federal District
2. North-West Federal District
3. Southern Federal District
4. Volga Federal District
5. Ural Federal District
6. Siberian Federal District
7. Far East Federal District
