= Plekhanov Russian University of Economics =

Public research university in Moscow

- Motto: To serve Russia
- Type: Public
- Established: 19 February 1907; 119 years ago
- Founder: Alexei Vishnyakov
- Rector: Ivan Lobanov
- Academic staff: 1,437
- Students: 14,103
- Undergraduates: 10,718
- Postgraduates: 3,384
- Location: Moscow, Russia; 55°43′40″N 37°37′41″E
- Campus: Urban
- Nickname: Plekhanovka
- Website: rea.ru

University rankings

Global – Overall
- QS World: 741-750 (2026)

Regional – Overall
- QS Emerging Europe and Central Asia: 75 (2022)

The Plekhanov Russian University of Economics (Russian: Российский экономический университет имени Г. В. Плеханова) is a public research university in Moscow, Russia. It was founded in 1907 by entrepreneur Alexei Vishnyakov as the first finance-specialized college in the Russian Empire.

In addition to accreditation by the Ministry of Education, the university had accreditation from the Association of Chartered Certified Accountants, European Council for Business Education and the Association of MBAs. PRUE is also a member of the European University Association (suspended in 2022 due to the 2022 Russian invasion of Ukraine), and the European Foundation for Management Development.

The Plekhanov Russian University of Economics changed its name more than once: Moscow Commercial Institute (1907–1919); Karl Marx Moscow Institute of the National Economy (1919–1924); Plekhanov Moscow Institute of the National Economy (1924–1991); Plekhanov Russian Academy of Economics (1992–2010); Plekhanov Russian University of Economics (2010 to present). Plekhanov University acquired the Russian State University of Trade and Economics and the Moscow State University of Economics, Statistics, and Informatics.

== History ==
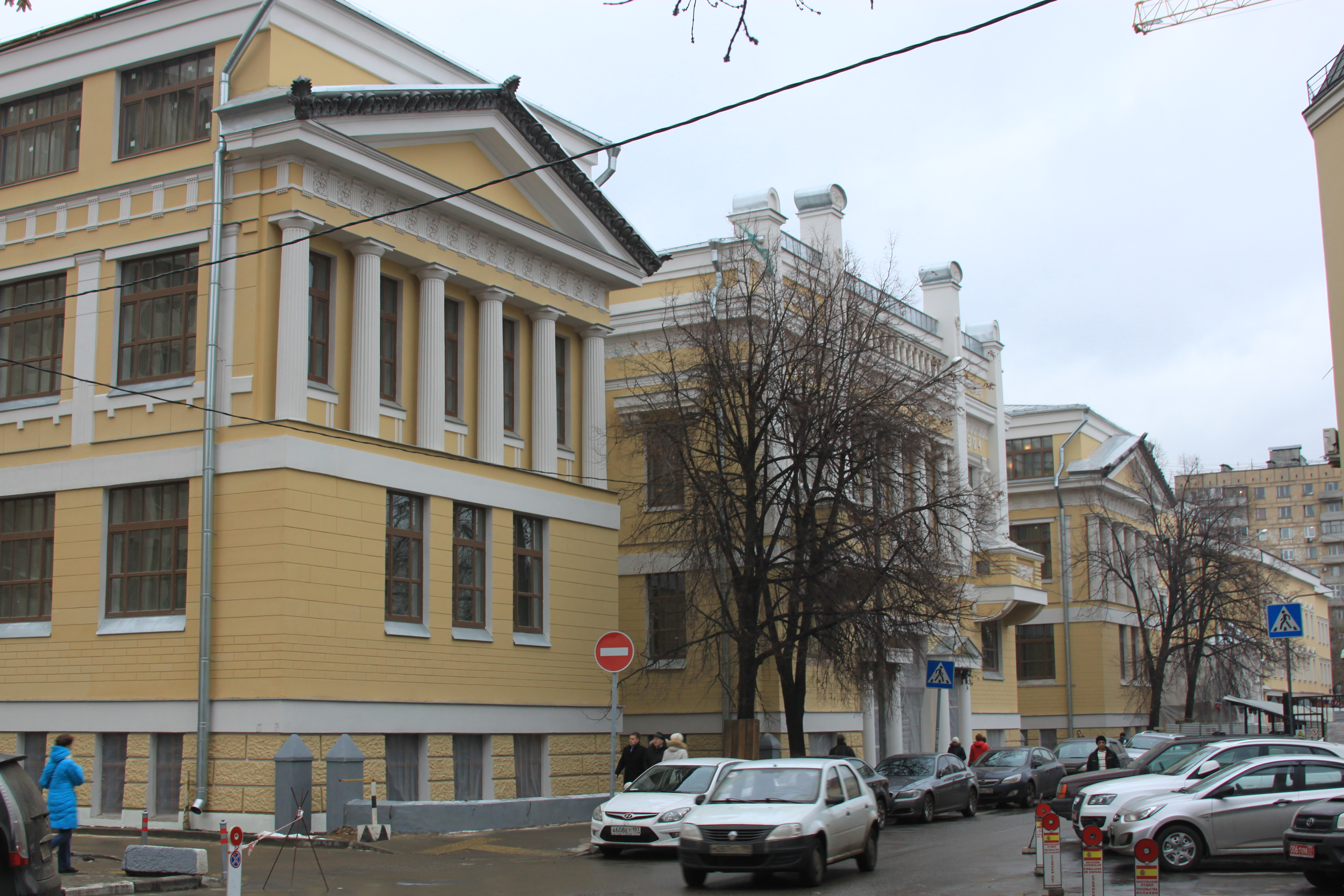
The Memorial Building and Museum of PRUE on Stremyaniy Street 28

The Moscow Commercial Institute was founded in 1907 on private donations of merchants, bankers and manufacturers, gathered at the initiative of Moscow merchant Alexei Vishnyakov. It was essentially the first institute in Russia offering higher business education in line with the then rapidly developing branches of Russian industry. Prior to the revolution of 1917, about 2,000 specialists were graduated from the institute. In 1924, it was renamed after Marxist revolutionary Georgi Plekhanov. In the 1960s, the institute was merged with the Moscow Governmental Economic Institute. After 1991, the institute obtained its current name. Recent years were marked with rising international cooperation, such as the foundation of the Africa Business House. Presently, the university deals with more than 80 partners in 52 countries. Among its graduates, there are many prominent politicians and businessmen, such as Soviet statesman Mikhail Suslov, liberal democrat Grigory Yavlinsky, and faculty member Ruslan Khasbulatov, former chairman of the Supreme Soviet of the Russian SFSR and later Chairman of the Supreme Soviet of the Russian Federation (1991–1993).

== Faculties ==
The university offers 4-year undergraduate (bachelor), 2-year graduate (master) and postgraduate (Ph.D.) courses in some academic fields as well as many non-degree courses. Some courses are available in English, but the majority of them are taught in Russian. A course may be completed at one of the university's schools:

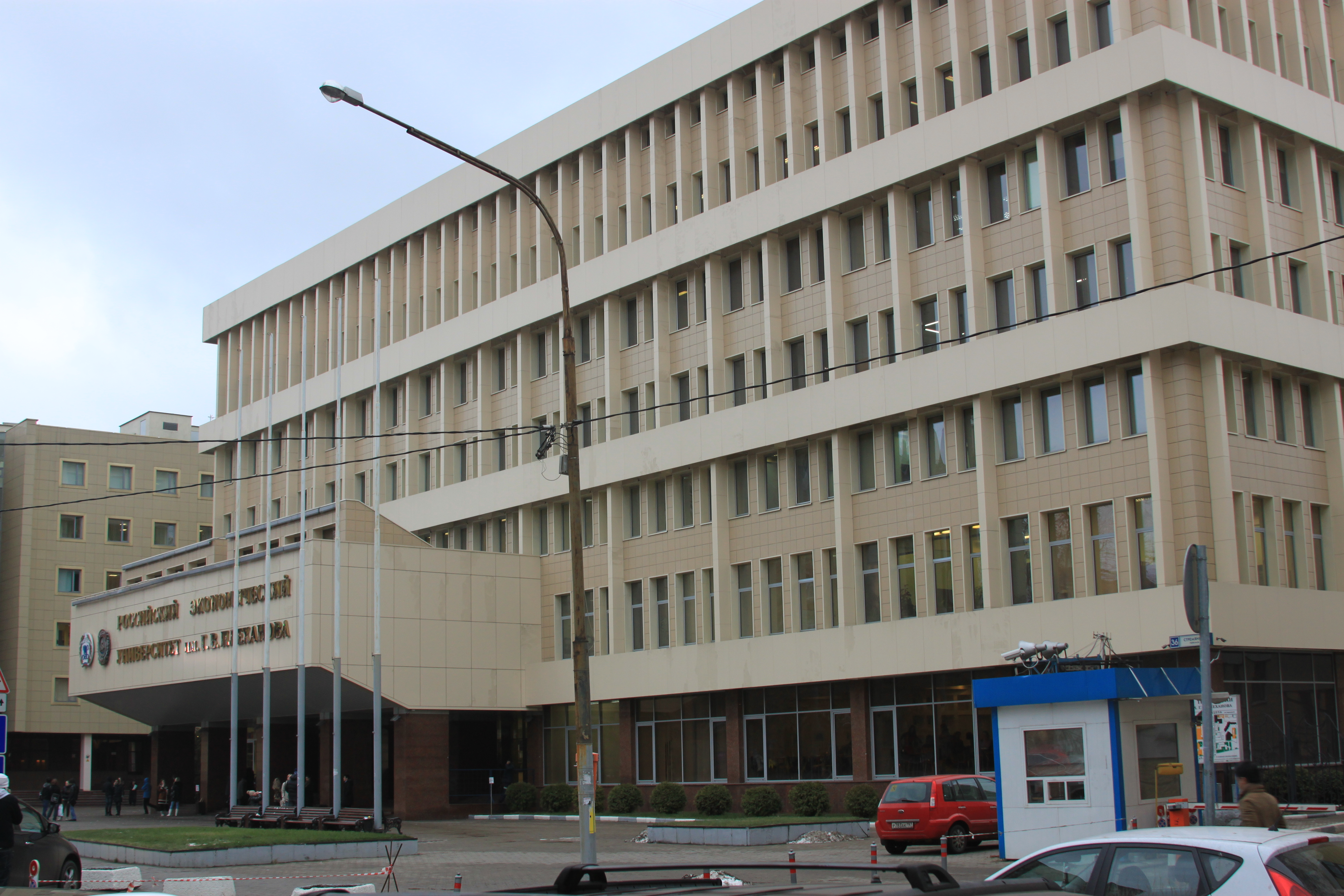
Building 3 of the university

- Institute of Management and Socio-Economic Projecting
- Faculty "Business School of Marketing and Entrepreneurship"
- Faculty "International Business School and Global Economics"
- Faculty "Integral Plekhanov Business School"
- Faculty of Hotel, Restaurant, Tourism, and Sports Industry
- Faculty of Distance Learning
- Faculty of Additional Professional Education
- Faculty of Marketing
- Faculty of Digital Economics and Information Technologies
- Faculty of Management
- Faculty of Economics and Law
- Faculty of Trade Economics
- Faculty of Online Education
- Faculty of Finance

== Academics and research ==
According to a ranking of Russian universities, based on the average score of the Unified State Exam, Plekhanov University is among the top 30 institutions overall, and among the top 10 specializing in social sciences.

Plekhanov University collaborated with universities from all over the world. Currently, Plekhanov University is working on attaining EQUIS accreditation.

== Media ==
P.R.U.E.(Plekhanov Russian University of Economics) has its own bilingual TV channel, Plekhanov TV, as well as Plekhanovets newspaper and Plekhanov Studio magazine. Some faculties release their own newspapers, e.g. FinFAQ magazine by Faculty of Finance.

== Campus ==
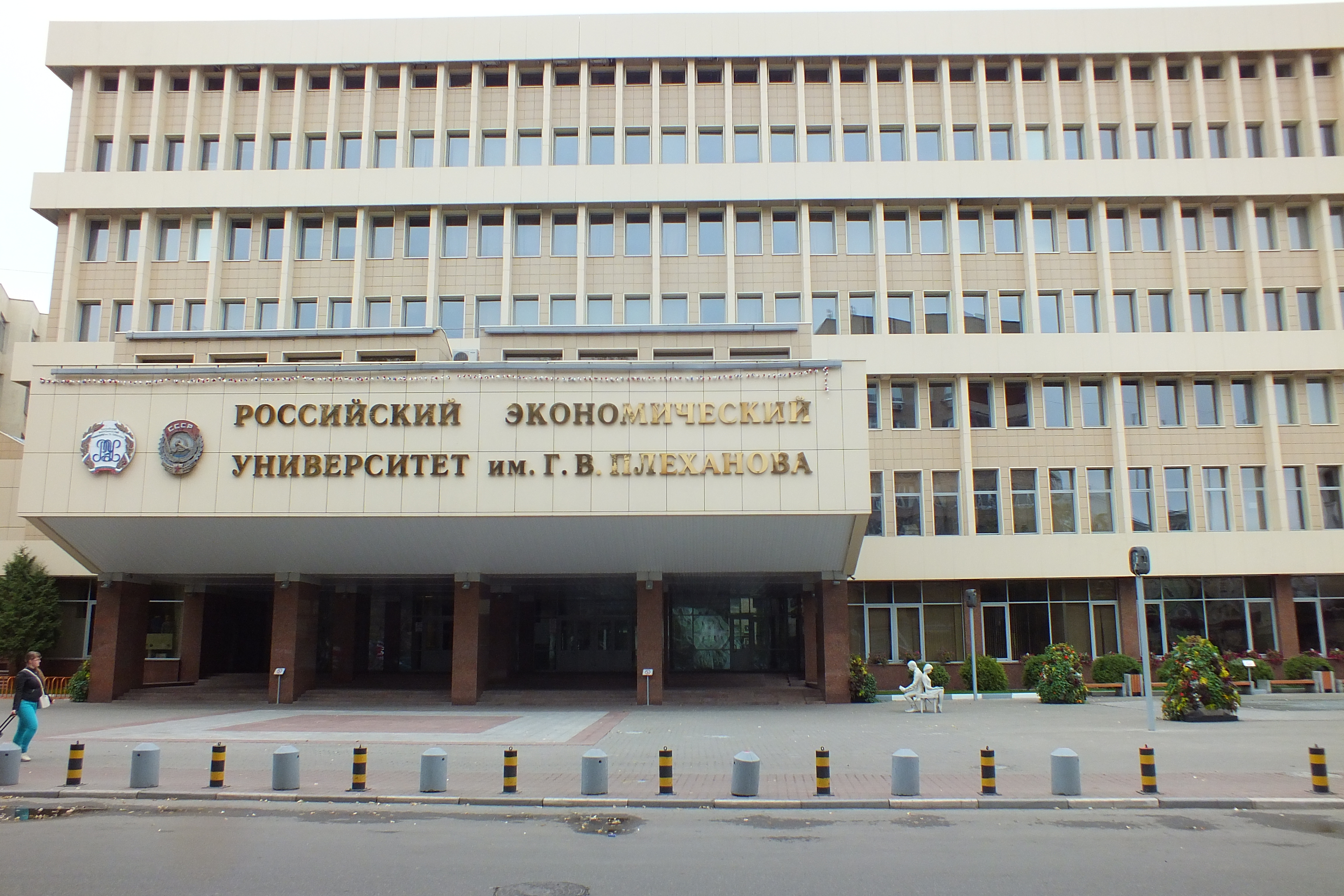
Main entrance to the Stremyannaya Campus

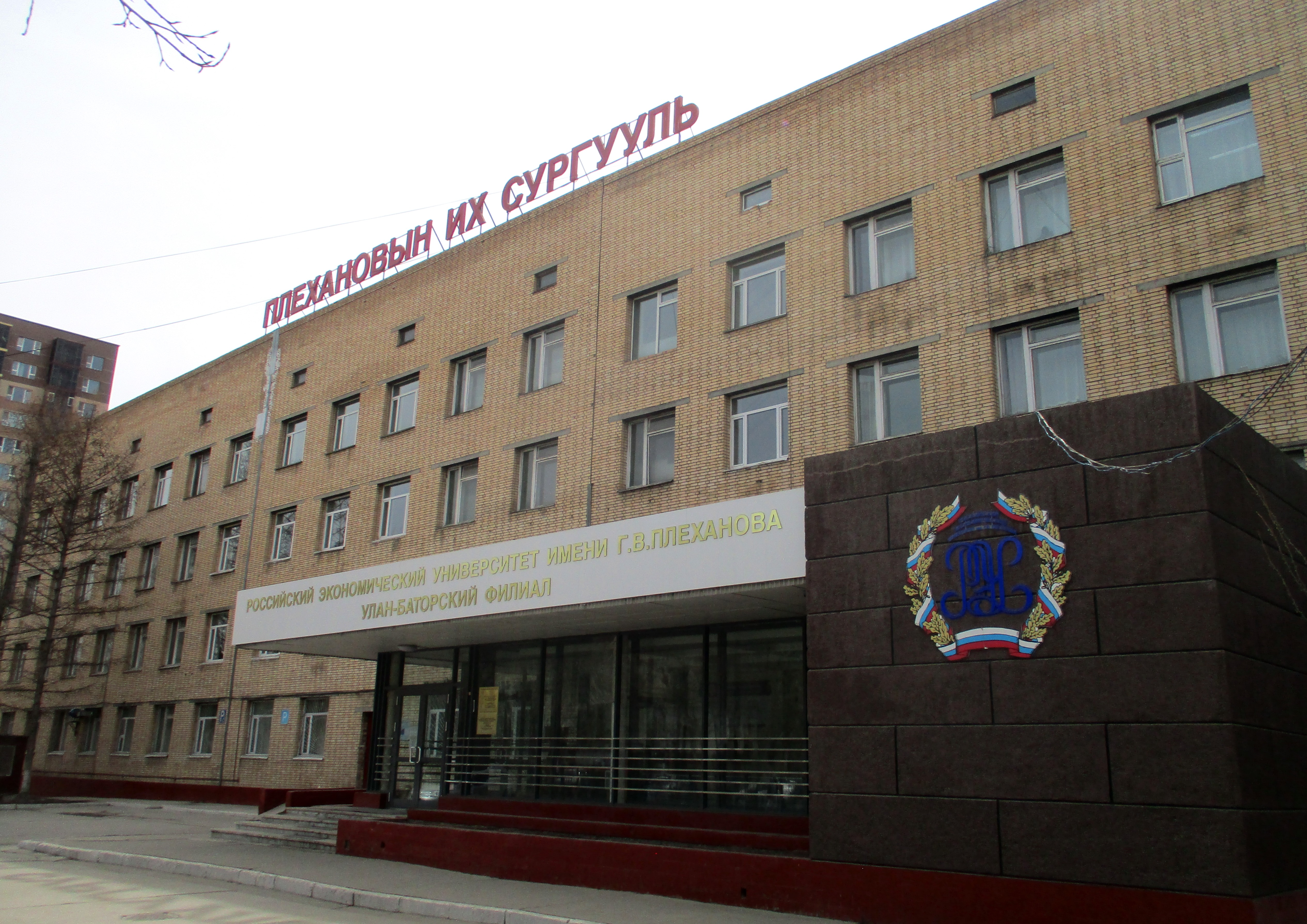
Ulaanbaatar branch

The university occupies eight buildings on one campus in the south of Moscow.

== Partners ==
List of partner universities

Austria

- Vienna University of Economics and Business http://www.wu.ac.at/
- IMC University of Applied Sciences Krems http://www.fh-krems.ac.at/
- University of Applied Sciences Steyr (School of management) http://www.fh-ooe.at/campus-steyr/
- Vorarlberg University of Applied Sciences http://www.fhv.ac.at/
- University of Applied Sciences Wiener Neustadt www.fhwn.ac.at/

Belgium

- EPHEC University College Brussels http://www.ephec.be/

Canada

- York University

China

- Lingnan University (Hong Kong)
- Sun Yat-sen University, Guangzhou http://www.sust.edu.cn/
- Beijing Foreign Studies University www.bfsu.edu.cn

Czech Republic

- Prague University of Economics http://www.czechuniversity.com/

Denmark

- Copenhagen Business School (CBS) http://www.cbs.dk/intoff

Finland

- University of Turku http://www.tse.fi/EN
- University of Tampere http://www.uta.fi/
- Hanken School of Economics http://www.hanken.fi/public/
- Lappeenranta University of Technology http://www.lut.fi/ Double Degree MA
- Haaga-Helia University of Applied Sciences http://www.haaga-helia.fi/en

France

- Skema Business School – Double Degree MA http://www.skema-bs.fr/
- NEOMA Business School – Double Degree BA http://www.neoma-bs.fr/
- Institut Supérieur de Commerce ESCE Paris http://www.esce.fr/
- ESSEC Business School – Double Degree BA http://www.essec.fr/
- ICN Graduate Business School – Double Degree BA www.icn-nancy.com/
- University Leonardo de Vinci www.devinci.fr
- Business School KEDGE – Double Degree BA www.kedgebs.com
- ESC Rennes School of Business – Double Degree BA http://www.esc-rennes.fr/index.php/en
- FBS Business School (Poitiers, Tours) www.escem.fr
- IESEG School of Management www.ieseg.fr Double Degree BA, MA
- Group ESC Troyes en Champagne – Double Degree BA http://study-in-champagne.com

Germany

- University of Applied Sciences Hof www.fh-hof.de/
- University of Cologne (Faculty of Economics, Management and Social Sciences) www.wiso.uni-koeln.de/index.htm
- European University of Applied Sciences Bruhl http://www.eufh.de/bruehl/
- Cologne Business School http://www.cbs-edu.net
- University of Mannheim (Business School) http://www.bwl.uni-mannheim.de
- University of Applied Sciences Würzburg-Schweinfurt – Double Degree BA http://www.fhws.de/
- University of Oldenburg http://www.uni-oldenburg.de/
- University of Applied Sciences Dresden – Double Degree BA http://www.htw-dresden.de/
- Munich Business School (University of Applied Sciences) http://www.international.munich-business-school.de/

Italy

- Bocconi University, Milan http://www.unibocconi.it/
- Ca' Foscari University of Venice www.unive.it

Japan

- Meiji University (School of Business Administration) http://www.meiji.ac.jp/

Norway

- BI Norwegian Business School (Oslo) http://www.bi.no/

Netherlands

- Amsterdam University of Applied Sciences (School of Economics and Management) http://www.hesasd.nl/
- University of Applied Sciences Arnhem (Business School) http://www.abs.han.nl/
- The Hague University of Applied Sciences (HEBO) http://www.haagsehogeschool.nl/
- Utrecht University of Applied Sciences – Double Degree BA (Institute of Business Administration) www.ibms.hu.nl
- University of Applied Sciences Groningen http://www.hanze.nl/
- Rotterdam University of Applied Sciences http://www.hogeschoolrotterdam.nl/

Portugal

- ISCTE – Lisbon University Institute http://iscte-iul.pt

Singapore

- Singapore Management University https://web.archive.org/web/20131227151745/http://www.smu.edu.sg/

Spain

- University of Valladolid http://www.relint.uva.es/
- ESIC Business and Marketing School Madrid www.esic.es
- La Salle University Barcelona www.salleurl.edu

Sweden

- Umeå University (School of Business and Economics) http://www.usbe.umu.se
- University of Gothenburg (School of Business, Economics and Law) http://www.handels.gu.se
- Linnaeus University (School of Business) http://www.bbs.hik.se/
- Jönköping University (International Business School) http://hj.se

Switzerland

- Zurich University of Applied Sciences, School of Management and Law (Wintertur) http://www.sml.zhaw.ch/de.html
- University of Geneva http://www.hesge.ch/heg/

Taiwan

- Ming Chuan University http://www.mcu.edu.tw/

United Kingdom

- Regent's University London https://web.archive.org/web/20061002091130/http://www.ebslondon.ac.uk/
- Nottingham Trent University (Nottingham Business School) www.ntu.ac.uk/nbs Double Degree BA
- University of Coventry Double Degree BA www.coventry.ac.uk

United States

- University of Northern Iowa

== Notable alumni ==
University alumni are employed in different spheres of Russian and world economy and politics. Its notable graduates include:

- Kseniya Alexandrova, Miss Universe Russia 2017
- Abul Barkat, economist, former chairman of state-owned Janata Bank and former chairperson of Department of Economics, University of Dhaka
- Olga Dergunova, deputy chairman of VTB Bank, former head of the Federal Agency for State Property Management, former president of Microsoft in Russia and the CIS
- Oleg Deripaska, billionaire, president of United Company RUSAL, founder of the Volnoe Delo Foundation
- Tatyana Golikova, head of the Account Chamber of Russia, former Minister of Health and Social Development of the Russian Federation
- Vladimir Kvint, head of the Department of Economic and Financial Strategy, Lomonosov Moscow State University
- Andrey Melnichenko, billionaire, chairman of Siberian Coal Energy Company, non-executive director of EuroChem
- Arkadiy Novikov, the first Russian known entrepreneur restaurateur
- Khabib Nurmagomedov, current student; retired from MMA in 2020 as UFC lightweight champion
- Mikhail Suslov, Soviet Politician, Former Second Secretary of the Communist Party of the Soviet Union
- Sergey Vilensky, Russian entrepreneur, head of the transport holding Resurs Group
- Grigory Yavlinsky, Russian economist and politician, founder of the political party Yabloko
- Mikhail Zadornov, president and chairman of VTB24 Bank, chairman of VTB Insurance, former Minister of Finance of the Russian Federation
- Valery Zubov, Senior MP in the State Duma

== See also ==
- List of business schools in Europe
