= Valery Solodchuk =

Russian military officer (born 1971)

- Валерий Солодчук
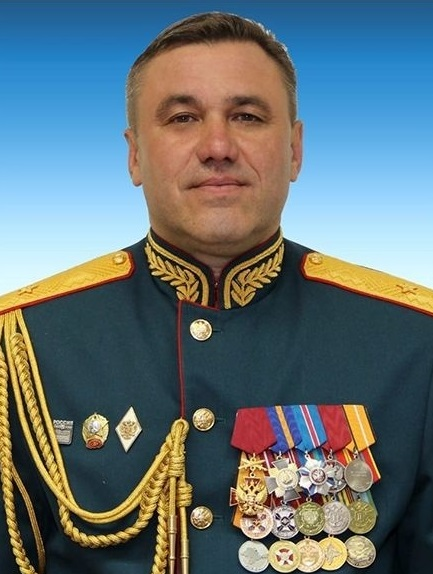
- Solodchuk in 2024

Deputy Minister of Defence
- Incumbent
- Assumed office 5 August 2026

Personal details
- Born: 24 March 1971 (age 55) Astrakhan, Russian SFSR, Soviet Union
- Education: Ryazan Guards Higher Airborne Command School; Combined Arms Academy of the Armed Forces; Russian General Staff Academy
- Awards: (2025); Order of Military Merit; Medal of the Order "For Merit to the Fatherland", II degree

Military service
- Allegiance: Russia
- Branch/service: Russian Airborne Forces
- Years of service: 1992–present
- Rank: Colonel General
- Unit: Center group of forces Kursk group of forces
- Commands: 7th Guards Mountain Air Assault Division; 1st Army Corps; 36th Combined Arms Army; Central Military District
- Battles/wars: Russo-Ukrainian war

Valery Nikolayevich Solodchuk (Russian: Валерий Николаевич Солодчук; born 24 March 1971) is a Russian army officer and currently a deputy minister of defence. Until 2026, he was commander of the Central Military District and joint group of forces "Center". He previously commanded the 36th Combined Arms Army of the Russian Armed Forces and the "Kursk" joint group of forces during the Russo-Ukrainian war from 2024 to 2025. In 2025, he was promoted Colonel General and awarded with the Hero of the Russian Federation title.

== Biography ==
After studying at the Leningrad Suvorov Military School, Solodchuk entered the Ryazan Airborne Command School, which he graduated from in 1992. He served in the positions of platoon commander to chief of staff of a regiment. In 2004 he graduated from the Combined Arms Academy of the Armed Forces of the Russian Federation.

Solodchuk graduated from the Military Academy of the General Staff of the Armed Forces of Russia in 2012, and between 2012 and 2014 commanded the 7th Guards Mountain Air Assault Division of the Russian Airborne Forces. Between fall 2014 and late spring 2015 he was commander of the 1st Army Corps (DPR), operating in Donetsk, Ukraine of the 12th Reserve Component Command of the Southern Military District. Between 2015 and 2017 he was Deputy Commander of the 5th Combined Arms Army of the Eastern Military District, and then from 2017 to 2020 Chief of Staff of the 36th Combined Arms Army, stationed in Buryatia. In January 2020 he became commander of the 36th Army. In December 2021 he was promoted to the rank of Lieutenant General.

=== Russo-Ukrainian war ===
At the beginning of the Russo-Ukrainian war on 24 February 2022, Solodchuk's command led the unsuccessful Battle of Kyiv. Entering from Belarus, a substantial portion of the 36th Army were stopped, then repelled by the Ukrainian Armed Forces west of Kyiv in March 2022. According to a call intercepted by Ukrainian intelligence, Solodchuk was almost shot in the same year while confronting rioting troops. The SBU claimed that he was one of the generals responsible for an attack on a hypermarket in Kharkiv in January 2025. Solodchuk was promoted to the rank of colonel general on 21 February 2025. In May 2025, he was appointed commander of the Central Military District, replacing Andrey Mordvichev.

In August 2026 he was appointed Deputy Minister of Defense of Russia.

== Awards ==
- Order of Military Merit
- Medal of the Order "For Merit to the Fatherland", II degree

== See also ==
- List of Russian generals killed during the Russian invasion of Ukraine

Military offices
Preceded by Andrey Mordvichev	Commander of the Central Military District; 2025-	Succeeded by Incumbent
Preceded by Mikhail Yakovlevich Nosulev	Commander of the 36th Combined Arms Army; 2020-2024	Succeeded by Vitaly Petrovich Gerasimov
Unknown	Chief of Staff of the 36th Combined Arms Army; 2017–2020	Unknown
Unknown	Deputy Commander 5th Combined Arms Army; 2015-2017	Unknown
Preceded by Office Established	Commander of the Donetsk People's 1st Army Corps; 2014–2015	Unknown
Preceded by Aleksandr Yurevich Vyaznikov	Commander of the 7th Guards Mountain Air Assault Division; 2012–2014	Succeeded by Aleksandrovich Breus
