= The Oligarchs =

2001 book by David E. Hoffman

The Oligarchs: Wealth and Power in the New Russia
- First edition front cover
- Author: David E. Hoffman
- Language: English
- Genre: History, economics, politics
- Publisher: PublicAffairs
- Publication date: 2001
- Publication place: United States
- Media type: Print (hardcover and paperback)
- Pages: 567 pp (first edition)
- ISBN: 978-1-58648-001-1
- OCLC: 48221381
- LC Class: HC340.12 .H64 2001

The Oligarchs: Wealth and Power in the New Russia is a 2001 non-fiction book written by Pulitzer Prize-winning author and Washington Post contributing editor David E. Hoffman. The book chronicles events of the transitional period in Russia, from the dissolution of the Soviet Union in the early 1990s, and the subsequent privatization in Russia, to the 1996 presidential election, the 1998 Russian financial crisis, and Vladimir Putin's rise to power in the late 1990s.

== Synopsis ==
Hoffman's account focuses on the rise of the Russian oligarchs, a group of businessmen who acquired great wealth and became very influential in Russian politics during the Boris Yeltsin presidency, and several state officials who were close to them. The book examines in detail the roles of six individuals:

- Boris Berezovsky (former owner of Sibneft oil company and at one time the principal shareholder in the country's main television channel, ORT)
- Mikhail Khodorkovsky (former owner of Bank Menatep and Yukos oil company)
- Vladimir Gusinsky (former media baron, founder of NTV channel and owner of several newspapers)
- Alexander Smolensky (owner of one of the largest private banks in Russia, SBS-Agro, which collapsed in the 1998 Russian financial crisis)
- Yury Luzhkov (long-time mayor of Moscow)
- Anatoly Chubais (influential member of Boris Yeltsin's administration and architect of Russian privatization)

== Reception ==
The book has been translated into several languages, including Russian, Spanish, Hebrew, Chinese and Croatian.

The book has received generally positive reviews from academic and popular publications. Writing for the journal Foreign Affairs, political scientist Robert Legvold called the book "a masterful blend of adventure and serious, informed analysis." Rosalie Parker, writing for The SAIS Review of International Affairs, gave a more mixed review which praised the book for its depth and digestible format while criticizing it for failing to "reconnect with the reality of everyday life in Russia."

== See also ==
- Privatization in Russia
- Russian oligarchs
