= The Dead Hand =

2009 book by David E. Hoffman

The Dead Hand: The Untold Story of the Cold War Arms Race and its Dangerous Legacy
- Front cover of The Dead Hand
- Author: David E. Hoffman
- Language: English
- Genre: History
- Publisher: Doubleday
- Publication date: 2009
- Publication place: United States
- Media type: Print (hardcover)
- Pages: 577 pp
- ISBN: 978-0-385-52437-7
- OCLC: 320432478
- Dewey Decimal: 909.82/5 dc22
- LC Class: U264.H645 2009

The Dead Hand: The Untold Story of the Cold War Arms Race and its Dangerous Legacy is a 2009 book written by David E. Hoffman, a Washington Post contributing editor. It was the winner of the 2010 Pulitzer Prize for General Nonfiction.

The book is based on a large number of published and unpublished sources, including interviews with political leaders, scientists, military officials and diplomats. The Russian automatic nuclear-control system known as "Dead Hand" is described in detail.

== See also ==
- Dr. Strangelove
