= Aleksey Semyonovich Vishnyakov =

Russian entrepreneur and philanthropist (1859–1919)

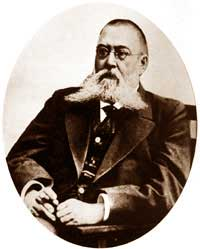
Aleksey Semyonovich Vishnyakov

Aleksey Semyonovich Vishnyakov (Russian: Алексéй Семёнович Вишняко́в; 1859–1919) was a Russian entrepreneur and philanthropist.

He is famous for creating the Moscow Commercial Institute in 1907, later known as the Plekhanov Russian University of Economics. It was, at that time, the first Russian university dedicated to commercial studies, and one of the first in Europe.

Several members of the Vishnyakov dynasty have been faculty members of the university, until today.
