= Igor Chubais =

- Игорь Чубайс
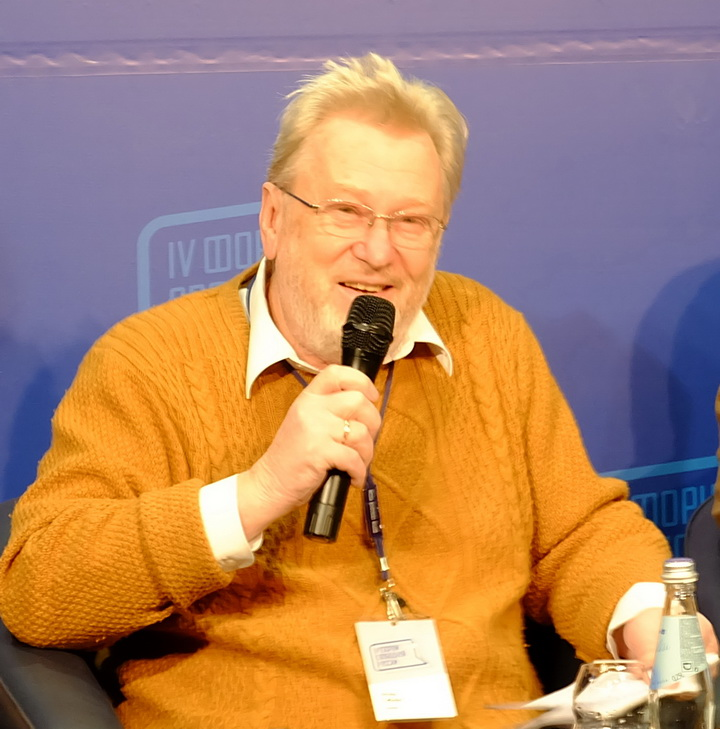
- Chubais in 2017
- Born: 26 April 1947 (age 79); Berlin, Soviet occupation zone of Germany

Education
- Education: Leningrad State University

Philosophical work
- Era: Contemporary
- Region: Russia
- Institutions: Peoples' Friendship University of Russia
- Main interests: Philosophy, Russian studies
- Igor Chubais' voice Chubais on the Echo of Moscow program, 22 November 2014

Igor Borisovich Chubais (Russian: И́горь Бори́сович Чуба́йс; born 26 April 1947) is a Russian philosopher and sociologist, Doctor of Sciences, and the author of many scientific and journalistic works. He is an initiator of the introduction of the Russian education system a new subject Russian studies. He is the first dean of "Russian studies" department at the Institute of Social Sciences and the director of Inter-University center for Russian studies in the faculty of Humanities and Social Sciences at the Peoples' Friendship University of Russia. He is a board member of the Russian Writers Union.

He is the older brother of Russian billionaire oligarch and politician Anatoly Chubais. The two have starkly different politics, and do not communicate with one another.

In 2010 he signed a petition of the opposition political advocacy campaign "Putin must go," and in September 2014 signed a statement demanding an end to the Russo-Ukrainian War, the annexation of Crimea by the Russian Federation and the Russian military support to separatists in Eastern Ukraine.

In the 2018 Russian presidential election, he was a confidant of Grigory Yavlinsky.
