= Valery Golubev =

Russian politician and businessman

Valery Aleksandrovich Golubev
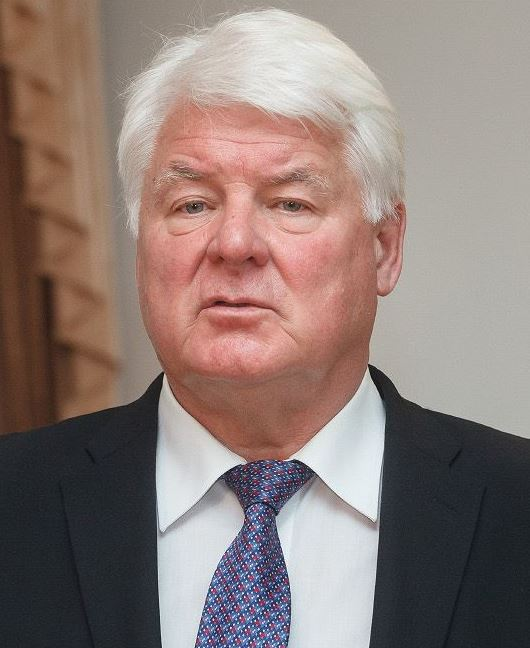
- Born: 14 June 1952 (age 73); Leningrad, RSFSR, USSR
- Occupations: Businessman and politician

Valery Aleksandrovich Golubev (Russian: Валерий Александрович Голубев, born June 14, 1952, Leningrad (Saint Petersburg), former Soviet Union) is a Russian politician and businessman. He is a former Head of the Vasileostrovsky Administrative District of St. Petersburg, former member of the Federation Council of Russia, and a Deputy CEO Gazprom and the Head of its Department for Construction and Investment. He retired in 2019.

== Awards ==
- Order of Honour (Moldova) (September 8, 2009)
- Order of Friendship (Republic of South Ossetia)
- Cross of the President of the Slovak Republic, II degree (Slovakia) (May 31, 2003)
