= Saint Petersburg Suvorov Military School =

- Russian: Санкт-Петербургское суворовское военное училище, romanized: Sankt-Peterburgskoe suvorovskoe voennoe učiliŝe
- Saint Petersburg; Russia

Information
- Type: Suvorov Military School
- Established: 1955; 71 years ago
- Website: spbsvu.mil.ru

Saint Petersburg Suvorov Military School (Russian: Санкт-Петербургское суворовское военное училище) is a military boarding school in Saint Petersburg, Russia.

== History ==
Saint Petersburg Suvorov Military School was founded in 1955.

In August 2025, Yunus-bek Yevkurov awarded the school the Order of Honour to mark the 70th anniversary of its establishment.

== Alumni ==
- Roman Romanenko (1988), Cosmonaut
- Yuri Sleptsov (1977), Mayor of Voskresensk
- Valery Solodchuk, army officer
