= Dangle (espionage) =

Agent who pretends to be interested in defecting to another side

Dangle (podstava in Russian intelligence jargon and chèvre in French police and intelligence jargon) is a term used in intelligence work to refer to an agent or officer of one intelligence agency or group who pretends to be interested in defecting or turning to another intelligence agency or group.

The goal of a dangle is to convince the second or foreign intelligence agency that they have changed loyalties by offering to act as a double agent. The dangle's loyalty to their original agency remains intact. They then feeds information to their original agency and/or gives disinformation to the second or foreign intelligence agency.

The KGB believed that most dangles:

1. would not come into a USSR government building with sensitive papers
2. would not directly ask for money right away instead
3. most walk ins would come in saying they wanted to be a spy for ideological reasons to prove their sincerity.

The dangle has the number of inherent risks similar to a normal double agent operation. The agent can sometimes experience high strain. Their home agency may ultimately begin to suspect them of actual—perhaps partial—compromised loyalty. This can begin to endanger the agent's cover or their life on operations.
