= The Billion Dollar Spy =

2015 book by David E. Hoffman

The Billion Dollar Spy: A True Story of Cold War Espionage and Betrayal
- Author: David E. Hoffman
- Language: English
- Genre: History, espionage
- Publisher: Doubleday
- Publication date: July 7, 2015
- Publication place: United States
- Media type: Print (hardcover and paperback)
- Pages: 312
- ISBN: 978-0-385-53760-5

The Billion Dollar Spy: A True Story of Cold War Espionage and Betrayal is a non-fiction history book by David E. Hoffman.

== Synopsis ==
The book covers the life of Russian engineer Adolf Tolkachev, nicknamed the "Billion Dollar Spy", who was executed by the Soviet Union after being caught passing information on classified radar technology to CIA agents.

== Reviews ==
The book received mostly positive reviews. Lawrence D. Freedman, writing for Foreign Affairs, described it as a "must-read" and praised it for "[describing] in such detail what it meant to run American agents in Cold War–era Moscow". Bob Drogan of the LA Times said that "To his credit, Hoffman describes the drab reality of most espionage work: long waits, endless paperwork, bumbling bureaucracy and often shoddy equipment." Kirkus Reviews described it as "an intricate, mesmerizing portrayal of the KGB-CIA spy culture".

== Adaptation ==
A thriller movie based on the book was announced in 2021 starring Mads Mikkelsen and Armie Hammer.

In March 2025, it was announced that the film had restarted production, with Russell Crowe, Harry Lawtey, and Willa Fitzgerald joining the cast, the former starring as the titular spy. Amma Asante signed on as director, with a script being done by Ben August and Stephen Gaghan. In April 2025, the rest of the cast was announced, along with the fact that principal photography began in Budapest.
