= Saint Petersburg State University Graduate School of Management =

Business school of Saint Petersburg State University

Graduate School of Management, St. Petersburg University
- Высшая школа менеджмента СПбГУ
- Established: 1993
- Accreditation: AACSB, AMBA, EQUIS (Triple accreditation temporary suspended from 2022)
- Academic affiliations: Saint Petersburg State University
- Director: Olga Dergunova
- Head of School: Konstantin Krotov
- Students: 1200
- Location: Saint Petersburg, Russia
- Campus: Urban/suburban
- Colors
- Nickname: GSOM SPbU
- Mascot: Freddie the Owl
- Website: gsom.spbu.ru/en

The Graduate School of Management (also known as GSOM SPbU) (Russian: Высшая школа менеджмента Санкт-Петербургского государственного университета, ВШМ СПбГУ) is the business school of Saint Petersburg State University. GSOM offers undergraduate, graduate, and postgraduate programs taught in English and Russian.

== History ==
- 4 November 1992: The university signs a cooperation agreement with Haas School of Business lead by David Teece.
- 1 September 1993: The School starts teaching. It counts six professors and 33 bachelor students. The first dean is elected Prof. Yu. V. Pashkus (Russian: Ю. В. Пашкус). The School is supervised by an International Advisory Board chaired by John E. Pepper, Jr., CEO, Procter & Gamble.
- 1999: The Faculty greets its first 19 Masters and opens an English-speaking ECTS-compliant program, Master of International Business, in cooperation with four Nordic business schools.
- 2004: The Faculty creates its R&D institute, signs an agreement with four European business schools to create an International Executive MBA (IEMBA) program, and joins AACSB.
- 2005: Most programs have transferred to the Bologna model, the Faculty starts offering Doktor Nauk's degree.
- 2006: The Faculty joins CEMS and EFMD and launches an Executive MBA (EMBA) program.
- 2008: GSOM SPbU launches corporate education programs in cooperation with Fuqua School of Business, joins PIM, and gets accredited by AMBA (Executive MBA) and EPAS (Bachelor's).
- 2009: GSOM SPbU joins GMAC and launches a Dual-Degree Executive MBA program in cooperation with HEC Paris.

== Programs ==
1. Bachelor's degree:
  - International Management
  - Management
  - Public Management
2. Master's degree:
  - Master in Management (MiM)
  - Master in Business Analytics and Big Data (MiBA)
  - Master in Corporate Finance (MCF)
  - Smart City Management (SCM)
3. Master's dual-degree:
  - within the MiM, MiBA, MCF programs
  - CEMS Master in International Management (CEMS MiM)
  - HEC-Paris
  - School of Business, Lappeenranta University of Technology, Kozminski University
4. Executive Education:
  - Executive MBA
    - Dual-Degree Executive MBA in English
    - Executive MBA in Russian
  - Corporate Education
  - Open Programs
  - Professional Development Programs
5. Candidate's and Doctor's degrees

== Faculty and structure ==
=== Director ===
The Director of the Graduate School of Management St. Petersburg University is Olga Dergunova, Deputy President and Chairman of the VTB Bank Management Board.

=== Advisory board ===
GSOM is supervised by the Advisory Board chaired by Deputy Prime Minister Sergei Ivanov.

=== Faculty and students ===
GSOM employs 89 full-time faculty members and over a lot of professors from other faculties of the university and international business schools, as well as leading management practitioners.

=== Premises and facilities ===
GSOM is headquartered in the Arthur B. Schultz building at 1-3 Volkhovsky Pereulok on Vasilievsky Island, which houses the administration, library, publishing house, and post-graduate programs. In 2006, the school was granted Grand Duke Mikhail Romanov's former summer estate in Petergof to redevelop it and create a suburban campus. The Mikhailovskaya Dacha campus was opened in 2015 and houses all undergraduate programs.

== Rankings and accreditations ==
In 2012 GSOM obtained institutional accreditation EQUIS (European Quality Improvement System). The quality of educational programs is approved by program accreditations: AMBA (Executive МВА) and EPAS (Bachelor).

According to EdUniversal ranking since 2008 GSOM SPbU is the first among Russian business schools, and in 2013 EdUniversal agreed for the second time that GSOM SPbU is the best among business schools of Eastern Europe. The Izvestia newspaper ranking (2011, 2012, 2013), based on interviews with MBA graduates, named GSOM as the first among Russian business schools.

On March 11, 2022, in a joint statement, EQUIS, AMBA and AACSB announced they "decided to suspend all membership and accreditation activities with Russian institutions until further notice. For students, the accreditation designation remains valid, and business degrees that have been conferred under that accreditation status are recognized as being from an accredited school at this time." All Russian institutions have been removed from all three accrediting agency's website's directory of accredited institutions.

	2013	2014	2015	2016	2017	2018	2019	2020	2021	2022
Financial Times Masters in Management	65	56	46	39	23	23	27	41	25	21
Financial Times European Business Schools	-	-	-	64	57	52	59	51	57	44
Financial Times Executive MBA Ranking 2020	-	-	-	-	-	-	-	91	-	79
Which MBA? The Economist Masters in Management	-	-	-	-	37	-	38	-	39	39
QS World University Rankings Masters in Management	-	-	-	-	-	83	97	94	101+	101+
QS World University Rankings Masters in Finance	-	-	-	-	-	69	101+	101+	101+	101+
National rating of Russian business schools from MBA.SU	1	1	1	1	2	1	2	2	1	1

== GSOM Family Alumni Community ==
GSOM Family is a business community of alumni, faculty, partners, and students of the Graduate School of Management at St. Petersburg University (GSOM SPbU). The community aims to maintain and strengthen effective interaction between all its members, as well as involve everyone in the development projects of the business school.

As of 2024, the community includes more than 2,000 graduates of the main educational programs of GSOM SPbU.

=== GSOM Family Projects ===
GSOM Family Day — an annual global meeting of alumni, students, faculty, and partners of GSOM SPbU. The first meeting was held on September 26, 2016, and the last one in September 2021. Official account of the event series on Instagram

TalentUp! Mentorship Program — an interaction project between students and alumni of GSOM SPbU, aimed at transferring experience in successful career building and personal development. It is an opportunity for a student to find a mentor from among GSOM alumni for their personal and/or professional development. During 6 months of productive interaction, the student can receive advice based on their mentor's personal career path. The mentor is selected individually based on the student's request and description.

After GSOM: Alumni Stories — a series in which graduates of the Business School, who have built careers in various companies, industries, and countries, share their stories.

GSOM Ambassadors — a project aimed at uniting GSOM SPbU alumni internationally and strengthening the GSOM Family community in different countries.

#StayHome with GSOM Family — a series of live broadcasts on the Instagram accounts of the School and the GSOM Family community, in which GSOM SPbU alumni share their career paths, projects, and hobbies, as well as useful tips in the field of professional life and self-development.

"Growth Territory" for MBA — a project within which MBA/EMBA program participants can take part in closed master classes and workshops on various professional topics relevant to top managers.

Success Stories — a project within which GSOM SPbU alumni who have become successful entrepreneurs, managers, and consultants share their success stories.

Business Projects of GSOM SPbU Alumni — a project that tells about startups and companies of alumni in various fields.

GSOM Family Chat — a Telegram chat that supports the idea of cooperation and networking of all members of the GSOM SPbU family. Assistance in finding a job or employees, expertise, information about GSOM SPbU events, and much more are available to chat participants. To join the chat, you need to contact the alumni relations department.

== See also ==
- Saint Petersburg State University
