= Olga Dergunova =

Soviet businessperson (born 1965)

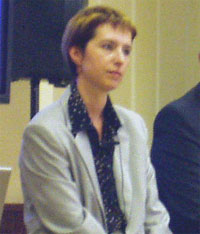
- Olga Dergunova as President of Microsoft Russia

Deputy Minister of Economic Development
- In office 29 June 2012 – 12 April 2016
- Preceded by: Gleb Nikitin
- Succeeded by: Dmitry Pristanskov

Personal details
- Born: 15 May 1965 (age 61) Moscow, Soviet Union
- Education: Plekhanov Russian University of Economics

Olga Dergunova (born 1965) is the Deputy President of VTB Bank, a bank headquartered in Russia. She was hired to head the IT systems merger for the different subsidiaries of VTB Bank. She started her career in the IT industry before working as President of Microsoft Russia. She transitioned to VTB Bank in 2007, working as a member of the Management Board, before leaving to serve in the Russian Government as Deputy Minister of Economic Development and also as the head of the Federal Agency for State Property Management. She was hired as Deputy President of VTB Bank in 2016. Her main initiatives as Deputy President include preparing the company for digital banking transformations, including artificial intelligence and distributed ledger technology, as well as allowing customers access to their finances without visiting a physical branch location. A 2001 Wall Street Journal report listed her among the Top 30 most influential European businesswomen.

== Early life and education ==
Olga Dergunova was born in Moscow in 1965, in what was then the Soviet Union. She studied at and graduated from the Plekhanov Russian University of Economics, focusing on computer science and economic cybernetics.

== Career ==
=== Early career ===
Before joining Microsoft Russia, Olga Dergunova worked as a sales and marketing director at a Russian IT company. She worked at various IT companies between 1992 and 1994.

=== Microsoft Russia (1994-2007) ===
Olga Dergunova was hired at Microsoft's relatively new Russian operation, which had only existed for 18 months. The operation at the time related to the licensing of the company's programs. She joined in part to gain a global perspective on the technology industry. In 1995, Dergunova was promoted to general director of the company's Russian branch, and she became its chair in 2004.

At the time that Dergunova entered Microsoft, Russia was slowly being converted from a communist country into a capitalist country, following the fall of the Soviet Union. During this period of time, the two primary concerns of Western IT companies operating in Russia were a lack of demand for their products and the online piracy of their products. Software used to be sold in the country unlicensed, so the idea of licensed software was relatively new to the country. Over the course of her tenure, and in the general Russian market, the piracy of software has declined. However, piracy was still common in the country in the mid-2000s.

One of her biggest roles was to explain the concept of intellectual property to Russian consumers, with the goal of decreasing piracy and increasing demand for the company's products. In order to improve the sales of Microsoft products in the country, she lowered the prices of the company's products and hired local residents to sell products to consumers. The programs were also translated into Russian. As a result of local hiring efforts, in 2005 over half of all Russian IT workers worked for Microsoft, according to Microsoft's estimate.

With regards to intellectual property enforcement, Dergunova usually focused on larger counterfeit software sellers rather than individuals who download the products for personal usage or for small-scale distribution.

=== VTB Bank (2007-2012) ===
In 2007, Olga Dergunova left Microsoft Russia to join VTB Bank's Management Board. This occurred shortly after VTB Bank's initial public offering in London. Her switch to banking also occurred during the 2008 financial crisis. Her family members, including her husband who works in finance, taught her many terms necessary to operate in a bank. She was hired as a member of the company's Management board. She also worked as the head of the Second Corporate Block, serving the bank's major clients. She worked in this role from 2007 to 2012, before her appointment to the Russian government.

=== State Property Management Agency (2012-2016) ===
In 2012, Olga Dergunova was appointed to head the Federal Agency for State Property Management and to serve as the deputy minister of economic development. The agency is responsible for privatizing formerly state-owned businesses as well as managing government properties. The overall privatization efforts sought to close the Russian governmental's budget shortfall caused by the collapse of oil prices, with efforts peaking in 2016. One of the first businesses that Dergunova oversaw that had the potential to be privatized was Sovcomflot. However, that business had not yet been sold by the time she left her position. Another business touted to be privatized was VTB bank; at that point, the government owned 60.9 of its outstanding shares. However, that deal did not happen as well, partly due to the recovery of oil prices generating more revenue for the Russian government to avoid having to sell equity in its businesses.

Overall, the privatization efforts sought to raise capital from Western investors in order to combat budget shortfalls due to both oil prices being depressed at the time as well as sanctions over Russia's annexation of Crimea. However, the agency led by Dergunova did not want to sell off equity in Russian companies at bargain prices, which would have reduced the government's control of the economy without a large enough return on the sale.

On the other end of the spectrum was a decree for state-owned enterprises, such as Gazprom, to raise dividends. Due to the high degree of state ownership, a very large portion of those dividends, if not the majority, would flow to the Russian government and reduce its budget shortfall. Dergunova stated that raising dividends would raise as much as 100 billion rubles ($1.7 Billion) in additional government revenue.

The lack of an acceptable sell price for equity as well as improving economic conditions in Russia stalled the efforts to privatize the economy. As of March 2019, the Russian government still owns the same 60.9% share of VTB Bank as it did in the past. The government also still owns 100% of Sovcomflot.

In January 2016, rumors of Dergunova's departure from her government position surfaced. A report by Russian media outlet, Kommersant, claimed that Dergunova slowed down privatization attempts. On April 12, 2016, Dergunova was officially released from her position, succeeded by Dmitry Pristanskov.

=== Deputy President at VTB Bank (2016-present) ===
On June 24, 2016, Olga Dergunova rejoined VTB Bank, this time as the Chairman of its Management Board and as its Deputy President. Dergunova was put in charge of positioning VTB Bank's digital strategies. Her core initiatives include making it possible to do banking digitally without ever having to reach a physical branch location. To that end, she first oversaw the integration of all of the bank's IT systems, utilizing her past experience at Microsoft Russia. The 2017 merger of VTB24, the group's retail banking group, was a big test for merging systems into one comprehensive system. The IT merger put 20 million clients onto one IT system. Merging banking operations was critical to allowing 24/7 access to its banking platforms.

At the beginning of her tenure, Dergunova sought to implement artificial intelligence into operations at VTB Bank, utilizing it to calculate credit risk. VTB Bank also used AI to automate the opening of accounts for individual components of companies. She also sought to utilize biometrics in its mobile applications and customer service centers in order to better verify a customer's identity and reduce the potential for fraud. In addition, in 2017, VTB Bank, along with other financial services companies, launched a 5-week Fintech Startup incubator to help develop different technologies. Also at the beginning of 2017, Dergunova sought to launch a new mobile application for VTB Bank, to be launched in early 2019.

=== Sanctions ===
Sanctioned by the UK government in 2022 in relation to Russo-Ukrainian War.

== Personal life ==
Olga Dergunova is married and has one daughter, Nina. She met her husband while they were both studying at university together. She likes to play golf, ski, and go camping.
