= Anatoly Chubais =

Russian politician and economist (born 1955)

- Анатолий Чубайс
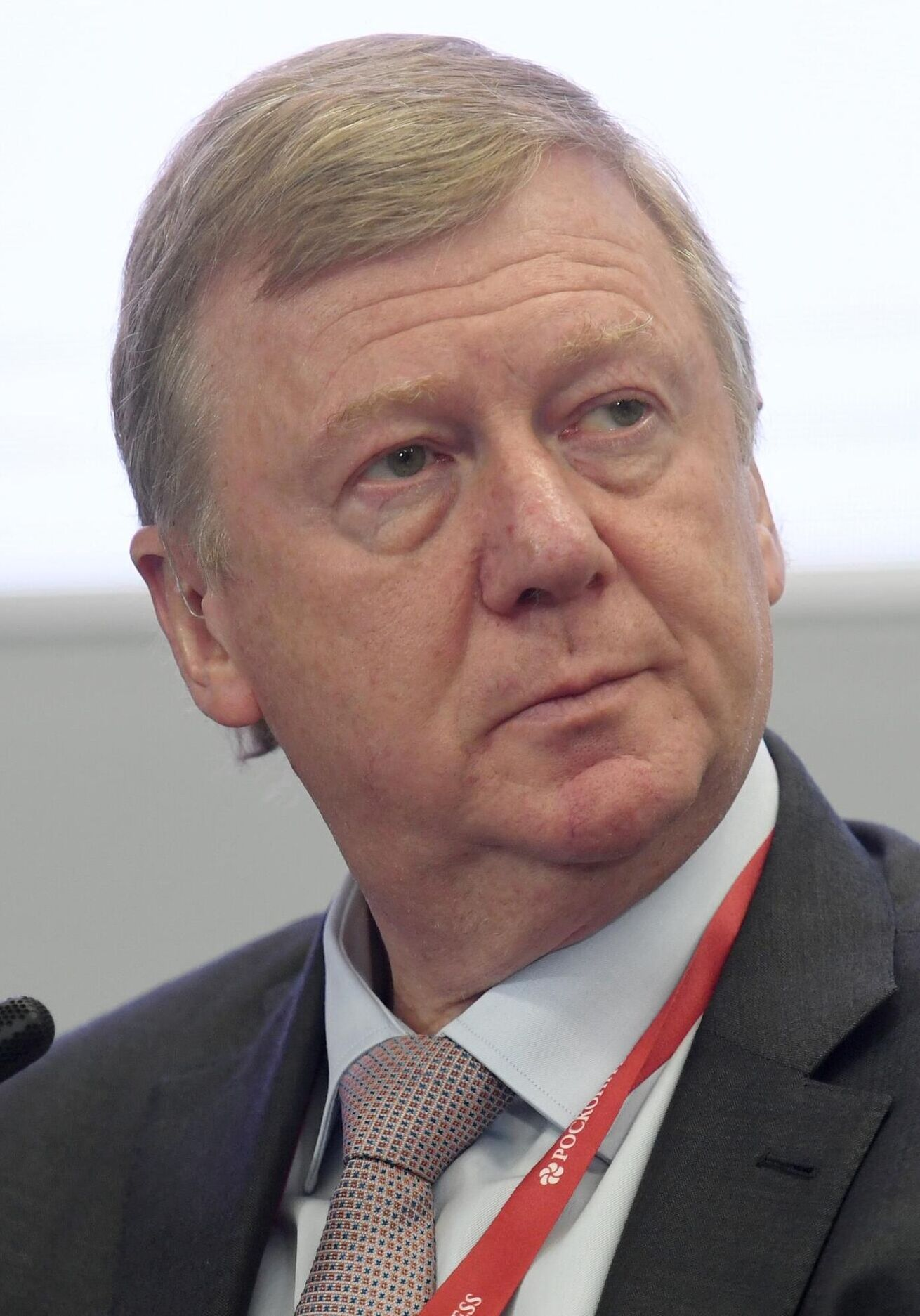
- Chubais in 2019

Special Presidential Envoy for Relations with International Organizations to Achieve Sustainable Development Goals
- In office 4 December 2020 – 22 March 2022
- Preceded by: Office established
- Succeeded by: Boris Titov

Chairman of the Executive Board of Rusnano
- In office 22 September 2008 – 3 December 2020
- President: Dmitry Medvedev; Vladimir Putin
- Preceded by: Leonid Melamed
- Succeeded by: Sergey Kulikov

Special Presidential Envoy for Relations with International Financial Institutions
- In office 17 June 1998 – 28 August 1998 Serving with Boris Nemtsov
- President: Boris Yeltsin
- Preceded by: Office established
- Succeeded by: Mikhail Zadornov

First Deputy Prime Minister of Russia
- In office 7 March 1997 – 23 March 1998
- Prime Minister: Viktor Chernomyrdin
- In office 5 November 1994 – 16 January 1996
- Prime Minister: Viktor Chernomyrdin
- Preceded by: Vladimir Kadannikov

Minister of Finance
- In office 17 March 1997 – 20 November 1997
- Prime Minister: Viktor Chernomyrdin
- Preceded by: Aleksandr Livshits
- Succeeded by: Mikhail Zadornov

Kremlin Chief of Staff
- In office 15 July 1996 – 7 March 1997
- President: Boris Yeltsin
- Preceded by: Nikolai Yegorov
- Succeeded by: Valentin Yumashev

Deputy Prime Minister of Russia
- In office 1 June 1992 – 5 November 1994
- Prime Minister: Yegor Gaidar (acting); Viktor Chernomyrdin

Member of the State Duma
- In office 11 January 1994 – 15 January 1996

Personal details
- Born: Anatoly Borisovich Chubais; 16 June 1955 (age 71) Borisov, Minsk Oblast, Byelorussian SSR, Soviet Union (now Belarus)
- Party: Independent
- Other political affiliations: Communist Party of the Soviet Union; Union of Right Forces
- Spouses: Lyudmila Grigoryeva (m. 1978; div. 1989) Maria Vishnevskaya (m. 1990; div. 2011) Dunya Smirnova (m. 2012)
- Relations: Igor Chubais (brother)
- Children: 2

Anatoly Borisovich Chubais (Russian: Анатолий Борисович Чубайс; born 16 June 1955) is a Russian-Israeli politician and economist who was responsible for privatization in Russia as an influential member of Boris Yeltsin's administration in the early 1990s. During this period, he was a key figure in introducing a market economy and the principles of private ownership to Russia after the fall of the Soviet Union. He has the federal state civilian service rank of 1st class Active State Councillor of the Russian Federation. He fled to Israel in 2022 and subsequently obtained Israeli citizenship.

From 1998 to 2008, he headed the state-owned electrical power monopoly RAO UES. A 2004 survey conducted by PricewaterhouseCoopers and the Financial Times named Chubais the world's 54th most respected business leader. He was the head of the Russian Nanotechnology Corporation (RUSNANO) from 2008 to 2020.

In December 2020, he was appointed a special envoy of the Russian president for relations with international organizations to achieve the Sustainable Development Goals. He resigned from this position in March 2022 and left Russia after opposing the Russian invasion of Ukraine, according to media reports. He is the highest ranked Russian figure to have resigned due to the invasion.

Chubais was a member of the Advisory Council for JPMorgan Chase from September 2008 until 2013. He is a long-time participant and speaker of the Bilderberg Club. On 30 May 2024, he took part in the club's 70th anniversary meeting in Madrid, Spain. That same year, he founded the Center for Russian Studies (CRS) at the Faculty of Social Sciences at Tel Aviv University. He is currently an acting member of The Global Board of Advisors of the Council on Foreign Relations.

== Early life ==
Chubais was born on 16 June 1955 in the town of Borisov, Belarus, which was then part of the Soviet Union, the son of Raisa Efimovna (Sagal) and Boris Matveyevich Chubais. Though his mother received a degree in economics at university, she opted to stay home to care for their children on the military bases where her husband was regularly assigned. Anatoly Chubais has an older brother, Igor Chubais (born 1947), a philosopher. Chubais is Jewish.

In 1977, Chubais graduated from the Leningrad Institute of Engineering and Economics (LEEI) in present-day St. Petersburg and joined the Communist Party of the Soviet Union until 1991 when he left it.

== Career ==
=== Early career (1977–1991) ===
While later working at LEEI, Chubais started a club called Reforma, which helped turn the city of Leningrad into a model of political reform by constructing platforms for both local and national elections. Reforma also engaged in drafting reformist legislation, an important step down the road when Chubais would work in the city government. In 1982, he attained the rank of associate professor (доцент) at LEEI, while in 1983, he received his Candidate of Sciences (Ph.D.) degree in Economics for the dissertation entitled "Исследование и разработка методов планирования совершенствования управления в отраслевых научно-технических организациях" (Research and Development of Methods for the Planned Improvement of Management in Industrial Research and Development Organizations).

Starting in the early 1980s, Chubais became a leader of an informal circle of market-oriented economists in Leningrad. In 1982, together with economists Yury Yarmagayev and Grigory Glazkov, he published an article titled "Вопросы расширения хозяйственной самостоятельности предприятий в условиях научно-технического прогресса" (Questions of Expanding the Autonomy of Business Enterprises under the conditions of Scientific and Technological Progress) in which the authors argue that no amount of central planning can predict the end-demand for products. In 1982, Chubais was introduced to the future Prime Minister of Russia Yegor Gaidar, who was invited to and attended seminars led by Chubais.

By 1987, Chubais had become the organiser of the Leningrad chapter of the club Perestroyka, whose mission was to promote and discuss democratic ideas among the local intelligentsia. Among the people involved were his brother, Igor, who had founded the Moscow-based chapter of the Perestroyka and Perestroyka-88 clubs, future Russian Deputy Prime Minister Alexei Kudrin, future Chubais associates Pyotr Mostovoy and Alexander Kazakov, the future President of Saint Petersburg bank Vladimir Kogan, future Minister of Anti-Monopoly Policy and Entrepreneurship Support Ilya Yuzhanov, and future Deputy Governor of Saint Petersburg Mikhail Manevich.

In 1988, he completed a 10-month internship in Hungary. He recalled it as follows: "Getting acquainted with Hungarian economic science turned out to be very useful and fruitful. I learned a lot". As a result of the internship, he wrote the work "Венгерский опыт реформирования хозяйственного механизма" (Hungarian Experience in Reforming the Economic Mechanism) was written and published.

The dissident economists organized a tulip farm to finance their seminars. In the four days before the International Women's Day (8 March), they managed to get income equivalent to the price of several Lada cars. The tulip money was used to finance the elections of Anatoly Sobchak, Yury Boldyrev and many other democratic candidates. As a result, 2/3 of the deputies winning the 1990 elections to Leningrad Soviet were from the opposition. Chubais himself later stated that he personally did not participate in growing or selling of the flowers.

At the end of 1990, the economist Vitaly Nayshul proposed the idea of using vouchers to facilitate mass privatization in order to transform the Soviet Union into a market economy. Chubais strongly criticized the scheme at the time, citing the inevitable inequality and social tensions that would result if implemented as proposed. Ironically, Chubais would later become the champion of the same concept just several years later.

=== Privatization chief in Leningrad (1990–1994) ===
In 1990, upon the election of Anatoly Sobchak as Chairman of the Leningrad City Council, Chubais assumed the position of his Deputy. He was trying to implement Sobchak's idea of creating a Free Economic Zone in Leningrad. In 1991, Chubais declined the offer to become the Chairman of the Leningrad Executive Committee to instead become an advisor to the mayoral administration in Leningrad (by now renamed St. Petersburg) where Sobchak had just been elected mayor. At the same time, Chubais worked as the president of newly established Wassily Leontief Center for Research in Economics.

=== In the Yeltsin government (1992–1999) ===
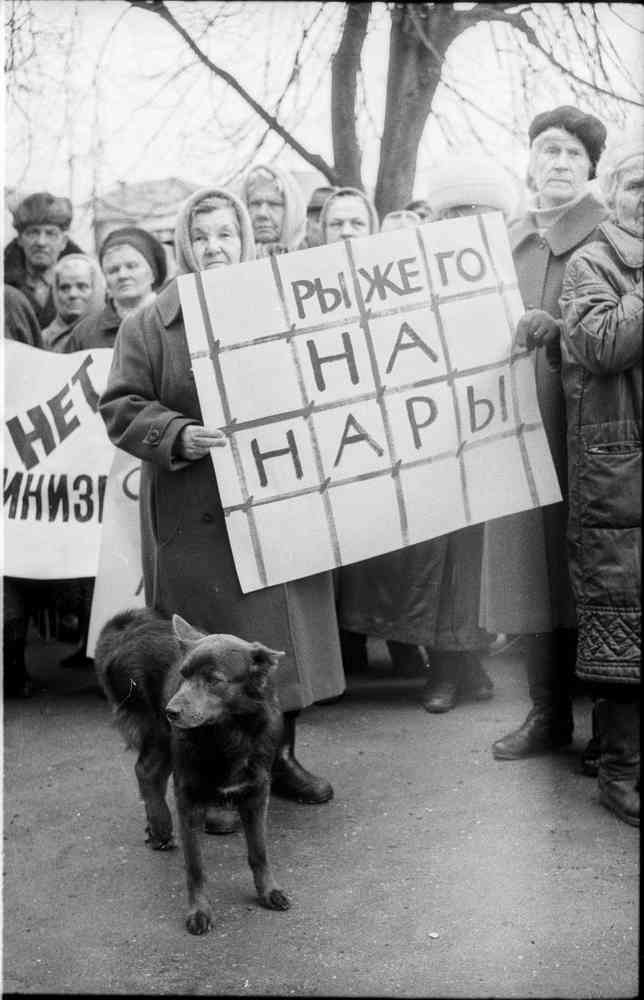
Protesters insist Chubais ("the redhead"; рыжего) must be imprisoned for the privatization process, April 1998. Chubais became known as "Redheaded Tolik" (Russian: рыжий Толик, lit. 'Little Anatole the Redhead').

Chubais originally advocated rapid privatization in order to raise revenue, similar to the model used in Hungary. However, the Congress of People's Deputies of Russia rejected this model. Eventually, Chubais developed a compromise in the form of a proposed voucher privatization program akin to the program used in the Czech Republic at the time. On 11 June 1991, the Supreme Soviet of Russia adopted this compromise and the massive program was officially initiated by decree of President Boris Yeltsin on 19 August 1991. In November 1991, Chubais became a member of the Yeltsin cabinet where he managed the portfolio of the Committee for the Management of State Property (GKI) which was handling privatization in Russia. He was recommended to Yeltsin by Yegor Gaidar. The GKI was understaffed, so Chubais filled it with many of his associates, mostly from his time in Saint Petersburg, including Alexander Kazakov, Alfred Kokh, Dmitry Vasilyev, Maxim Boycko, and Andrei Illarionov. In June 1992 he was appointed as a deputy prime minister by Yeltsin, and was responsible for economic matters. He was also later made the first head of the Federal Commission of Securities, before being replaced in that role by Vasilyev.

The implementation of the program experienced many problems. The vouchers were not guaranteed by the government, and enterprises did not have to accept them. Some of the most profitable enterprises were not included in the voucher scheme. The vouchers were anonymized and could be bought or sold. Each voucher was worth ten thousand rubles, but the hyperinflation that Russia experienced in 1992 and 1993 greatly reduced the value. Many people ended up selling their voucher, and even those that did use them to buy shares never received ownership or income. The joint stock companies did not pay dividends. At the same time, some businessmen started funds to buy up vouchers, and used them to take control of large enterprises at a small fraction of their worth. Enterprises and properties that had provided basic services were also sold off in auctions, and after that their new owners catered to the emerging small wealthy class, increasing prices and making them unaffordable for the great majority of Russians. All of this occurred in a relatively short time frame.

This privatization program came under heavy criticism. The word voucher became synonymous with swindle, and Chubais, according to The New York Times, became "the most despised man in Russia." Chubais later admitted in his book History of Russian Privatization that the voucher program did not create a large class of property owners, and that it decreased production. Chubais and his associates worked with the Harvard Institute for International Development (HIID), which was in charge of U.S. foreign aid to Russia during the Clinton administration. It operated with minimal USAID oversight, and Chubais' group, and some of the foreign advisors from HIID, allegedly profited using his position in the Yeltsin administration. HIID members were involved in drafting presidential decrees related to privatization, which were promulgated by Yeltsin under the influence of Chubais. With the help of HIID, "private" organizations founded by Chubais and his associates in Russia received significant amounts of foreign aid, which they enriched themselves with.

Yeltsin reshuffled the cabinet in early 1994 as Russia experienced economic difficulties, which left Chubais as the only original reformer still in the cabinet. A new wave of privatization took place in 1994, overseen by Chubais and the GKI, which auctioned off some of the largest industrial enterprises in the world. Chubais was removed as chairman of the GKI in November 1994. From November 1994 until January 1996, Chubais held the position of First Deputy Prime Minister of Russia for economic and financial policy in the Russian government. Thanks to liberalizing reforms carried out in 1995, the Russian government was finally enjoying a measure of financial stability, something its politicians had been seeking ever since the resignation of Yegor Gaidar in 1993. By the end of 1995, the average annual inflation-rate had declined from 18% to 3%. From April 1995 until February 1996, Chubais also represented Russia in two international financial institutions – the International Bank for Reconstruction and Development (IBRD) and the Multilateral Investment Guarantee Agency (MIGA).

After resigning as deputy prime minister in January 1996, Chubais agreed to manage Boris Yeltsin's reelection campaign. By this time, according to public opinion surveys, Yeltsin's approval rating had fallen to roughly 3%. Chubais established the Civil Society Foundation as well as Yeltsin's Campaign Analytical Group, which became one part of the Foundation. The group helped Yeltsin regain popularity and win re-election in the second round of the polls on 3 July 1996, capturing 53.82% of the popular vote. From July 1996 until March 1997, Chubais served as the chief of the Presidential Administration of Russia. During his tenure, his office grew increasingly influential. When Yeltsin underwent an operation in the fall of 1996, his prime minister Viktor Chernomyrdin was vested with some of his powers, but Chubais received even more economic and political authority. Yeltsin was criticized by the State Duma for giving Chubais too much power. In March 1997, Chubais returned to the cabinet as First Deputy Prime Minister of Russia. That summer he became involved in scandal regarding his book on privatization.

Chubais participated in the Bilderberg Club session at Turnberry, Scotland in 1998, and co-chaired the Round Table of Industrialists of Russia and the EU during the joint session of the Government Commission of the Russian Federation and the European Union. He was also elected to the Board of Russian Union of Industrialists and Entrepreneurs in 2000.

According to Yeltsin's daughter and chief-of-staff Tatyana Yumasheva, Chubais opposed the nomination of Vladimir Putin as Prime Minister of Russia and Yeltsin's successor in 1999. Although Chubais believed Putin was qualified for the position, he feared that his appointment would be rejected by the State Duma, allow the Communist Party of the Russian Federation to gain a large enough parliamentary majority to amend the constitution, and start a civil war.

=== RAO Unified Energy System of Russia (1998–2008) ===
In 1998, Chubais was elected to the chairman of the board of RAO UES of Russia, the state-owned electricity monopoly, at a special general meeting of shareholders; he soon was also appointed chairman of the board.

Since 2000, Chubais consistently defended the need for further reform, which included dis-aggregating power generation, transmission, and distribution activities from the monopoly holding company in order to facilitate the subsequent sale of a majority of shares to private investors. Chubais was convinced that the un-bundling and privatization of the state monopoly were the only mechanisms able to raise the substantial funds needed to modernize Russia's electricity sector.

He was elected president of the CIS Electric Power Council (2000), and later was repeatedly re-elected to that post from 2001 to 2004.

In addition to reforms, Chubais and his team raised more than $30 billion in private investments for the Russian electric power sector. The funds were used to finance the construction of new facilities: 130 new units with a total capacity of about 29,000 MW, 10,000 kilometers of transmission lines, 60,000 kilometers of distribution network lines, and thousands of electrical sub-stations of all classes of voltage. His reforms also helped eliminate the use of barter payments and significantly reduced the number of payment defaults in the sector.

On 17 March 2005, he survived an assassination attempt. Vladimir Kvachkov was charged for the crime, but was acquitted by a jury.

In 2007, the Russian newspaper Vedomosti named Chubais the "Professional of the Year". The paper called him the only professional reformer in Russia because of his achievements in breaking of one monopoly into dozens of independent entities, introducing market forces into the electricity distribution system, and transforming a government institution structure into one attractive for private investment and management.

In July 2008, RAO UES of Russia ceased to exist as a legal entity.

=== RUSNANO (2008–2020) ===
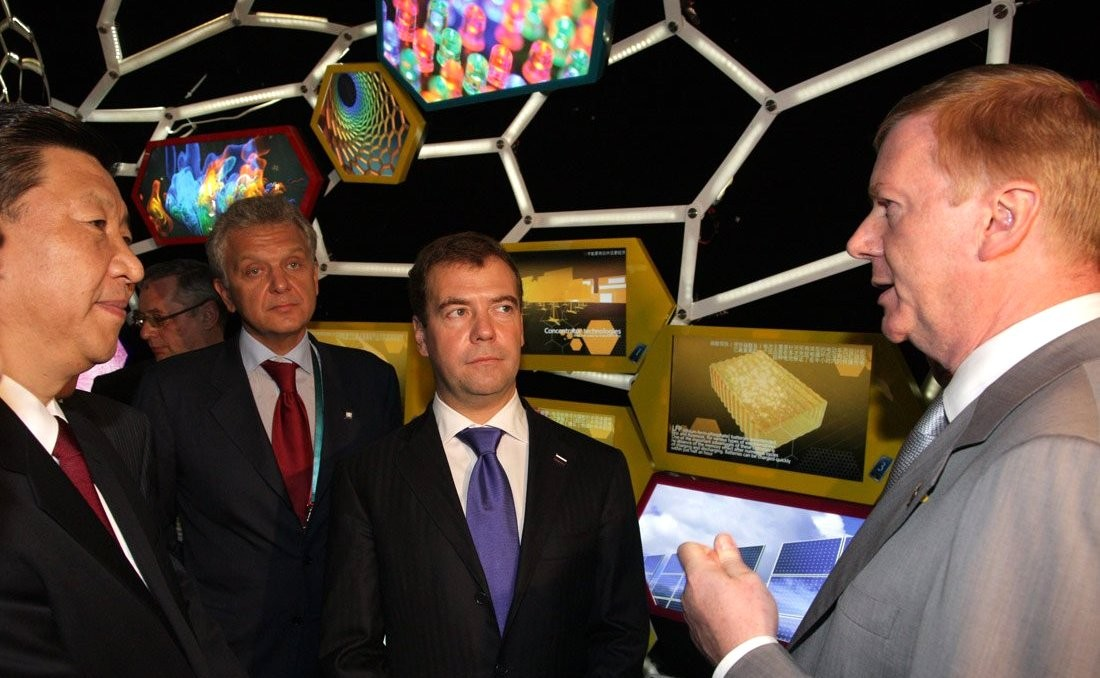
Anatoly Chubais with Dmitry Medvedev and Xi Jinping, 28 September 2010

Since September 2008, Chubais has been General Manager of the State Corporation Rosnanotech.

The official business of the corporation is to promote innovation and modernization in Russia's economy in several areas. For example, RUSNANO forms an important part of the government's strategy to find economic alternatives to fossil fuels. The corporation has set a target of 900 billions rubles in sales by 2015. In the past, Chubais has compared RUSNANO to a garden in which the corporation cultivates innovative business ventures. Over its eight years of operation (2007–2015), RUSNANO has completed over 100 investment projects which resulted in the opening of 68 new plants and 28 R&D centers. As stated in the annual RUSNANO groups' financial report, the value of RUSNANO's portfolio was estimated in 2015 at 227.7 billion rubles and its net income at 17 billion rubles.

Chubais has been a member of the Skolkovo Foundation Council since 2010, and in 2011 was elected chairman of the board of LTD RUSNANO.

He left the organization in December 2020.

=== Resignation (2022) ===
On 22 March 2022, after Russia launched its invasion of Ukraine, Chubais resigned from his position as special envoy, after sending a letter to Mr. Putin criticizing the decision to invade Ukraine and calling for an immediate end to hostilities, according to the UN Special Rapporteur on the situation of human rights in the Russian Federation Mariana Katzarova. Kremlin spokesperson Dmitry Peskov confirmed that Chubais had resigned, but did not specify why, stating: "Whether he left or not is his personal matter". Alexei Venediktov, who had been in contact with him, reported that Chubais had left due to his disagreement with the war with Ukraine. Chubais left Russia, arriving in Istanbul, Turkey, on the same day, planning to remain abroad. Alexei Navalny's spokesperson, Kira Yarmysh, suggested that Chubais had "left Russia only out of fear for his own skin and his own money". He was the highest ranked Kremlin official to resign following the start of the invasion, though he is not a member of Putin's inner circle. He now lives in Israel.

=== Independent researcher (2023) ===
In the summer of 2023, Chubais published an article in the Russian academic journal Voprosy Ekonomiki on the problem of non-payments in the Russian economy in the early 1990s. The author positions himself as an independent researcher from the UK.

=== Center for Russian Studies (2024) ===
On 16 April 2024, there was a presentation of the launch report of the new Center for Russian Studies (CRS) - Russian Future Initiative founded by Anatoly Chubais at the Faculty of Social Sciences at Tel Aviv University. The mission of the center is a “comprehensive study of Russia's possible future based on the analysis of the events of its recent past.”

Anatoly Chubais commented on the opening of the Center that “Russia is changing the direction of its development for the second time in the last 35 years. It is crucial now to rise above emotions, personal destinies, and political preferences and attempt to re-understand our recent history. Only in this way can we gain lessons that will truly be relevant in the future.”

== Personal life ==
Chubais is married to Dunya Smirnova (a screenwriter and TV presenter) and has two children from his first marriage: a son, Aleksey, and a daughter, Olga.

On 1 August 2022, Chubais told Russian journalist Ksenia Sobchak that he had been hospitalised with the neurological disorder Guillain–Barré syndrome, though Sardinian newspaper L’Unione Sarda reported that Italian authorities had not yet ruled out poisoning, and Italian intelligence services are awaiting his blood toxicology results in order to make sure he was not poisoned.

In 2025, Russian courts ordered the seizure of Chubais's assets in connection with civil claims brought by Rosnano, including a claim seeking 11.8 billion rubles in damages.

== Involvement in political parties ==
In June 1993, Anatoly Chubais co-founded the "Russia's Choice" electoral bloc (Vybor Rossii), which was headed by Yegor Gaidar. In December 1993, running under this bloc, Chubais was elected as a deputy to the Russian State Duma in its first convocation.

On 12–13 July 1994, Chubais was elected to the governing council of the party "Democratic Choice of Russia", which had been built off the electoral bloc "Russia's Choice". In December 1998, Chubais became a member of the Organizing Committee of Right Cause coalition and was elected to the Steering Committee of the Organizing Committee of this coalition.

In July 1996, Chubais founded the "Center for Protection of Private Property" Foundation.

In May 2000, Chubais was elected co-chairman of the Coordinating Council of the Russian National Political Organization "Union of Right Forces" at its founding congress. He was also later elected co-president and a member of the Federal Political Council on 26 May 2001, during the founding congress of the "Union of Right Forces" Party (SPS).

On 24 January 2004, he resigned from his post as co-chair of the party but remained on the Federal Political Council of the SPS party.

In May 2010, Chubais became the chairman of the board of trustees of the Gaidar Foundation, jointly established by the Gaidar Institute for Economic Policy and Maria Strugatsky.

== Assassination attempts ==
In November 2004, in an interview with Financial Times, Chubais said: "I know of at least three orders for my murder. I know all the details, the names of those who were supposed to carry them out. The last such order was made a year and a half ago. It had purely political motives: hatred because I "sold Russia." When every day, returning home, you assume that a killer with an anti-tank grenade launcher could be around the corner, then your perception of political risks changes. Yes, perhaps today, the risk is several percent higher than in 2000. But in 1992–1999, the risk was several times greater."

Six months later, in March 2005, an attempt was made on Chubais. On the route of his car near the village of Zhavoronki, Odintsovsky District, Moscow Oblast, an explosive device with a capacity of 3 to 12 kg of TNT was detonated, followed by machine gun fire. Chubais and his companions were saved by the fact that the car they were in was armored.

The president of the Russian Union of Industrialists and Entrepreneurs, Arkady Volsky, said that the people behind the attempt on Chubais were "those whom we often see on TV, whose names appear in the media." Nikolay Kovalyov, then the former head of the Federal Security Service and chairman of the State Duma Committee on Veterans Affairs, expressed the opinion that they did not want to kill Chubais, but to intimidate him, and the attack was ordered by the heads of energy companies who were dissatisfied with Chubais's activities at RAO UES. On the contrary, Boris Nemtsov argued that the attempt on Chubais's life was not related to his work at RAO, but "was of a political nature," especially since the death threats repeatedly received by Chubais "came from his political enemies." Vyacheslav Volodin, then Vice-Speaker of the State Duma from the United Russia faction, suggested that the people behind the assassination attempt were "new candidates for the role of sponsors of the right": Boris Berezovsky and Leonid Nevzlin.

Charges for the assassination attempt were brought against retired GRU colonel Vladimir Kvachkov, former officers of the 45th Airborne Regiment R. P. Yashin and A. I. Naidenov, as well as member of the executive committee of the Congress of Russian Communities Ivan Mironov, the son of the former Chairman of the Press Committee Boris Mironov. The investigation was conducted by the Department for Investigation of Particularly Important Cases of the Prosecutor General's Office of the Russian Federation. According to investigators, the crime was committed on the basis of extremist views and hostility towards Chubais. In March 2006, the Moscow Regional Court began to consider the criminal case against Kvachkov, Yashin, and Naydenov with the participation of a jury. The criminal case against Ivan Mironov was separated into separate proceedings. The defendants were charged under five articles of the Criminal Code of the Russian Federation: encroachment on the life of a statesman or public figure (Article 277); attempted murder (Art. 30, Part 3; Art. 105, Part 2); illegal acquisition and storage of weapons and explosives (Art. 222, Part 3); intentional destruction and damage to property (Art. 167, Part 2).

On 20 December 2006, the jury was dismissed after a prosecution witness recanted his testimony given during the investigation that he had heard the defendants talking about their intention to commit an attempt on Chubais. The defendants' lawyers believed that the witness testified during the investigation under pressure. Representatives of Chubais believed that unprecedented pressure was exerted by the defense on the jury. On 6 December, the second jury was dissolved: it turned out that one of the jurors could not serve as a jury by law, since she was registered in a drug dispensary. On 5 June 2008, the third jury returned a not guilty verdict to all three defendants, recognizing the charges against them as unproven.

In an interview with Echo of Moscow on the first day after his release, Kvachkov said that he considered himself a Russian nationalist and stated: "I did not want to kill Anatoly Borisovich Chubais, but I would like him to stand trial and be hanged." Kvachkov explained: "the destruction of Chubais is not a crime for me," since "Chubais is a national traitor," and "Russia is occupied by the Jewish mafia."

On 25 June 2008, the Prosecutor General's Office appealed the acquittal in the case of the attempt on Chubais. On 26 August 2008, the Supreme Court overturned the acquittal and sent the case for a new trial to the Moscow Regional Court. The charges against Ivan Mironov were combined with the charges against the other defendants. On 29 September 2010, the jury again acquitted the defendants. On 22 December 2010, the Supreme Court rejected the cassation appeal of the Prosecutor General's Office against the acquittal. Thus, the accused were finally acquitted.

On 23 December 2010, Kvachkov was detained on charges of organizing rebellion and terrorism. On 8 February 2013, the Moscow City Court sentenced him to 13 years in prison for preparing to organize an armed rebellion. Later, the Supreme Court of Russia reduced the sentence to eight years in prison.

== Sanctions ==
In November 2023, Chubais was added to Ukraine's sanctions list.

In June 2025, Canada also imposed sanctions on him under its Special Economic Measures Act, but removed him from its sanctions list in August 2026.

== Awards ==
In 1997, the British magazine Euromoney named him the world's best Minister of Finance.

In December 2001, Chubais was awarded an honorary diploma of International Award by the International Union of Economists for his significant contributions to the Russian Federation, specifically his work applying advanced international experience to introduce contemporary methods of organizing administration, economics, finances and production processes.

In 2008, Chubais was awarded a Presidential Commendation for helping draft part of the Russian Constitution as well as his overall contributions to democracy in Russia.

In 2010, Chubais was honored by with IV degree Order For Merit to the Fatherland "for outstanding contribution to the implementation of state policy in the field of nanotechnology and many years of favorable work".

Chubais received three presidential commendations (awarded in 1995, 1997 and 1998) and as well as one honorary Ph.D. from the St. Petersburg State Engineering and Economic University.

Preceded by Mikhail Maley	Head of the Russian State Property Committee; 10 November 1991 – 5 November 1994	Succeeded by Vladimir Polevanov
Preceded by Nikolay Yegorov	Chief of the Russian presidential administration 15 July 1996 – 7 March 1997	Succeeded by Valentin Yumashev
Preceded by Boris Brevnov	Chairman of RAO UES; 30 April 1998 – 1 July 2008	Succeeded by Company ceased to exist
Preceded by Leonid Melamed	Director General of Russian Nanotechnology Corporation since 22 September 2008	Succeeded by Sergey Kulikov
