= David E. Hoffman =

American writer and journalist

- In a 2023 interview
- Born: David Emanuel Hoffman; November 14, 1953 (age 73); Palo Alto, California, U.S.
- Education: University of Delaware; Oxford University
- Occupations: Writer; journalist
- Writing career
- Notable works: The Oligarchs (2002); The Dead Hand (2009); The Billion Dollar Spy (2015)
- Notable awards: Pulitzer Prize for General Nonfiction (2010); Pulitzer Prize for Editorial Writing (2024)

David Emanuel Hoffman (born November 14, 1953) is an American writer and journalist. He spent the majority of his journalistic career at The Washington Post, working there from 1982 to 2009 and 2012 to 2025 as both Moscow bureau chief (1995–2001) and as a contributing editor. He won a Pulitzer Prize in 2010 for The Dead Hand, a book about the legacy of the nuclear arms race, and another Pulitzer Prize in 2024 for his "Annals of Autocracy" article series on the tactics authoritarian regimes use to repress dissent.

== Journalism ==
Hoffman was born in Palo Alto, California and grew up in Delaware, where he attended the University of Delaware. He came to Washington, D.C. in 1977 to work for the Capitol Hill News Service. As a member of the Washington bureau of the San Jose Mercury News, he covered Ronald Reagan's 1980 presidential campaign. In May 1982, he joined The Washington Post to help cover the Reagan White House. He also covered the first two years of the George H. W. Bush presidency. His White House coverage won three national journalism awards.

After reporting on the State Department, he became Jerusalem bureau chief for The Washington Post in 1992. After studying Russian at Oxford University, he began six years in Moscow. From 1995 to 2001, he served as Moscow bureau chief, and later as foreign editor and assistant managing editor for foreign news.

Hoffman's first book was published by PublicAffairs in 2002, The Oligarchs: Wealth and Power in the New Russia. He won the annual Pulitzer Prize for General Nonfiction in 2010 for his second book, The Dead Hand: The Untold Story of the Cold War Arms Race and its Dangerous Legacy (Doubleday, 2009). The Prize citation termed it "a well documented narrative that examines the terrifying doomsday competition between two superpowers and how weapons of mass destruction still imperil humankind." In 2015, Hoffman published The Billion Dollar Spy: A True Story of Cold War Espionage and Betrayal about the life of Soviet engineer Adolf Tolkachev, who was arrested and executed for giving classified information to the CIA.

In 2024, he won the Pulitzer Prize for Editorial Writing for a series of articles on new technologies and the tactics authoritarian regimes use to repress dissent.

In October 2024, Hoffman stepped down from the editorial board of the Post, resigning in protest of owner Jeff Bezos's decision to withhold an endorsement in the 2024 presidential election. Hoffman stayed at the Post as an editor and journalist, but he and other members of the editorial board had desired to endorse Kamala Harris for president. Hoffman wrote at the time "I believe we face a very real threat of autocracy in the candidacy of Donald Trump."

Hoffman was fired from The Washington Post in October 2025 as part of a wide-ranging personnel switch in 2025 at the Post, widely perceived as owner Jeff Bezos attempting to mend bridges with the second Trump administration after major clashes during Trump's first term between him and the Post. His firing (along with several other staffers terminated on the same day) attracted notice as it took place on Yom Kippur, the most important day of the Jewish High Holidays, and Hoffman is Jewish; companies generally refrain from such matters on religious holidays.

== Bibliography ==
- The Oligarchs: Wealth and Power in the New Russia (PublicAffairs, 2002), ISBN 978-1-58648-001-1
- The Dead Hand: The Untold Story of the Cold War Arms Race and its Dangerous Legacy (Doubleday, 2009), ISBN 978-0-385-52437-7
- The Billion Dollar Spy: A True Story of Cold War Espionage and Betrayal, New York, Doubleday, 2015, ISBN 978-0385537605 (about Adolf Tolkachev)
- Give Me Liberty: The True Story of Oswaldo Payá and his Daring Quest for a Free Cuba, New York, Simon & Schuster, 2022, ISBN 978-1982191191
