= Federal Agency for State Property Management =

Russian government agency

- Федеральное агентство по управлению государственным имуществом (Росимущество)
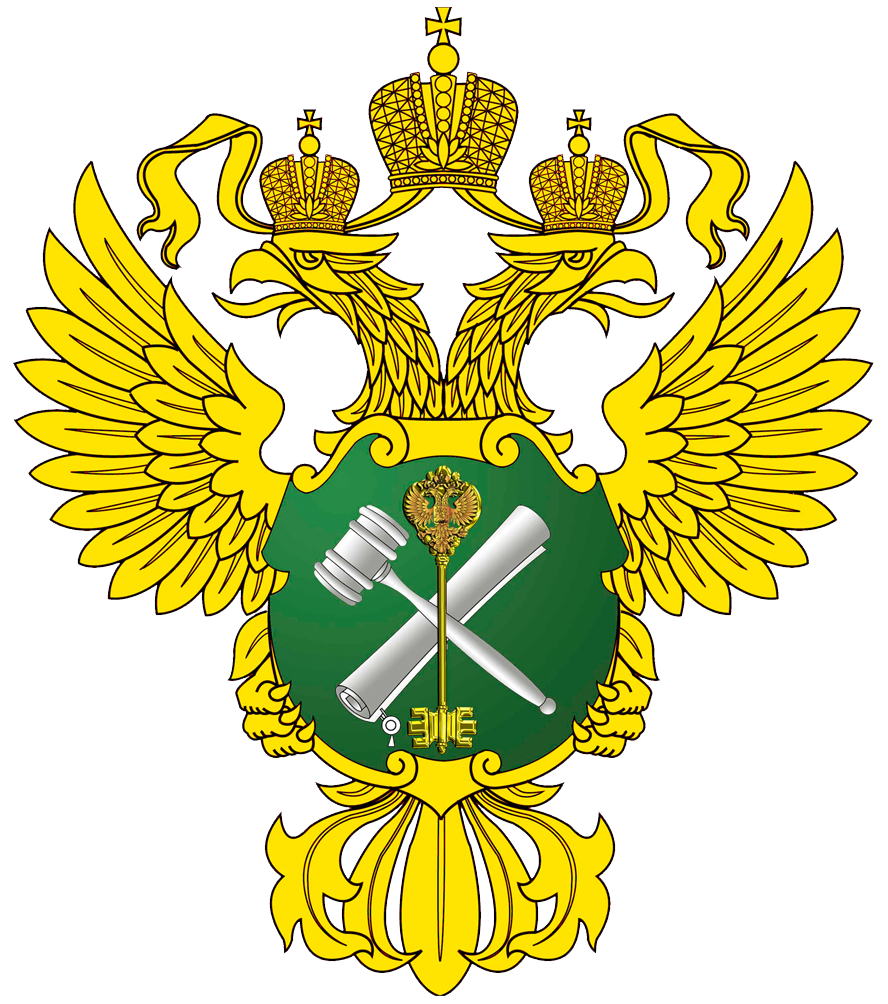

Agency overview
- Formed: March 9, 2004
- Headquarters: Nikol'skiy pereulok, dom 9, Moscow, Russia
- Agency executive: Vadim Yakovenko
- Parent department: Ministry of Finance
- Website: rosim.gov.ru

The Federal Agency for State Property Management (Rosimushchestvo) (Russian: Федеральное агентство по управлению государственным имуществом (Росимущество)) is a subdivision of the Russian Ministry of Economic Development that manages Russia's federal state property.

== History ==
The agency was formed by a presidential decree, No.314, signed on March 9, 2004, by Vladimir Putin, of the Ministry of Property Relations of Russia and subordinated to the Ministry of Economic Development and Trade.

Before this, in 1990 – 2004 its functions were performed by a separate ministry known by the following names:

- July 14, 1990 – September 23, 1997: State Committee for State Property Management of the Russian Federation (GKI, Goskomimushchestvo) (in Russian: Государственный комитет Российской Федерации по управлению государственным имуществом (ГКИ, Госкомимущество)
- September 23, 1997 – May 18, 2000: Ministry of State Property of the Russian Federation (Mingosimushchestvo of Russia) (in Russian: Министерство государственного имущества Российской Федерации (Мингосимущество России))
- May 18, 2000 – March 9, 2004: Ministry of Property Relations of the Russian Federation (in Russian: Министерство имущественных отношений Российской Федерации)
- March 9, 2004 – May 12, 2008: Federal Agency of Federal Property Management (in Russian: Федеральное агентство по управлению федеральным имуществом)
- June 5, 2008: Federal Agency for State Property Management (in Russian: Федеральное агентство по управлению государственным имуществом (Росимущество)

== Heads of the Committee/Ministry/Agency ==
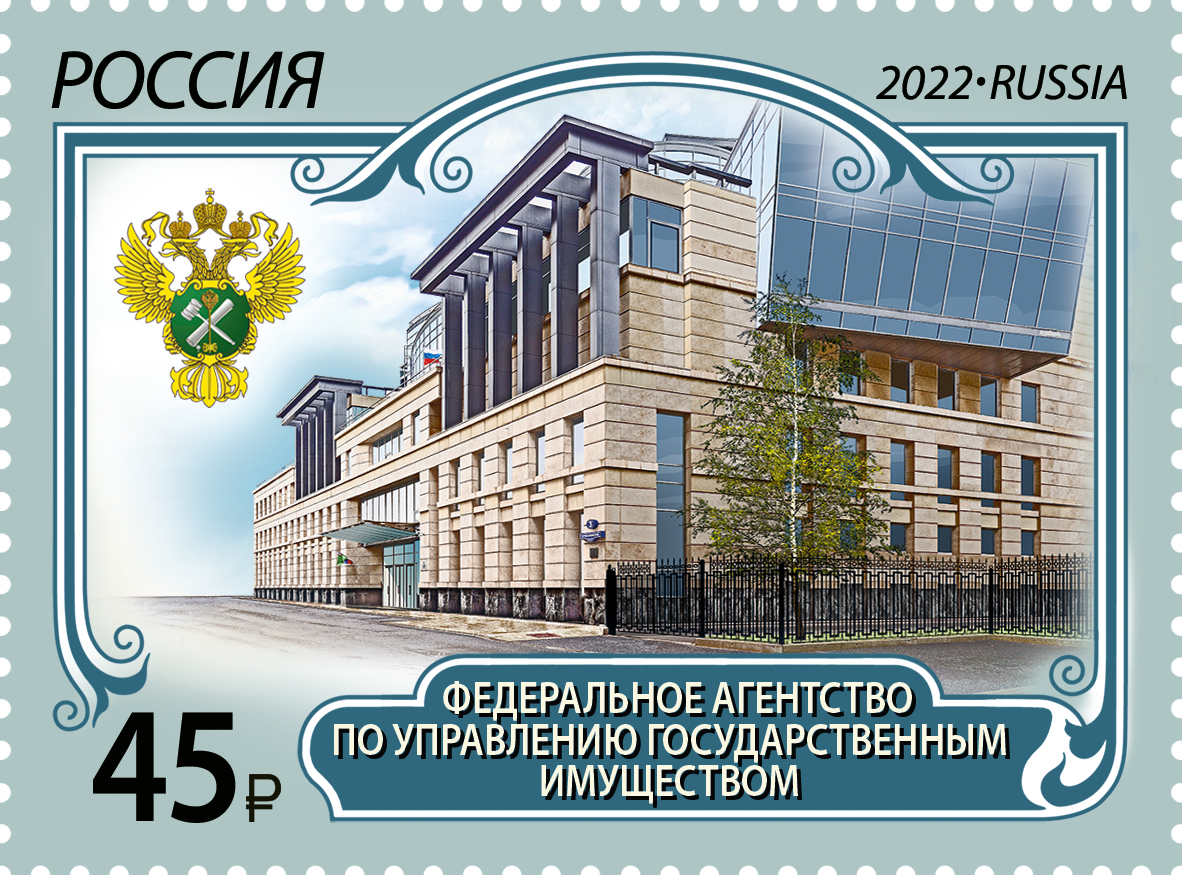
Russian postal stamp issued in 2022 commemorating the agency

- Mikhail Maley (November 21, 1990 – November 10, 1991)
- Anatoly Chubais (November 10, 1991 – November 5, 1994)
- Vladimir Polevanov (November 15, 1994 – January 24, 1995)
- Sergey Belyaev (February 8, 1995 – January 10, 1996)
- Alexander Kazakov (January 25, 1996 – July 19, 1996)
- Alfred Kokh (September 12, 1996 – August 13, 1997)
- Maxim Boycko (August 13, 1997 – November 15, 1997)
- Farit Gazizullin (November 18, 1997 – March 12, 2004)
- Valery Nazarov (March 12, 2004 – May 26, 2008)
- Yury Petrov (May 26, 2008 – December 20, 2011)
- Gleb Nikitin (December 26, 2011 – June 29, 2012, acting)
- Olga Dergunova (June 29, 2012 – April 12, 2016)
- Dmitry Pristanskov (April 20, 2016 – present, he also holds the rank of Deputy Minister for Economic Development of the Russian Federation)

== Structure ==
As of 2012, Chief of Rosimushchestvo Olga Dergunova had seven deputies: Dmitry Pristanskov, Valery Bely, Pavel Potapov, Yevgeny Gavrilin, Eduard Adashkin, Sergey Maximov and Pavel Fradkov. Fradkov is son of former Russian Prime Minister and now Director General of the Russian intelligence service SVR Mikhail Fradkov.

== See also ==
- Privatization in Russia
- SASAC
