= Privatization in Russia =

Post-Soviet reforms of the Russian economy in the 90s

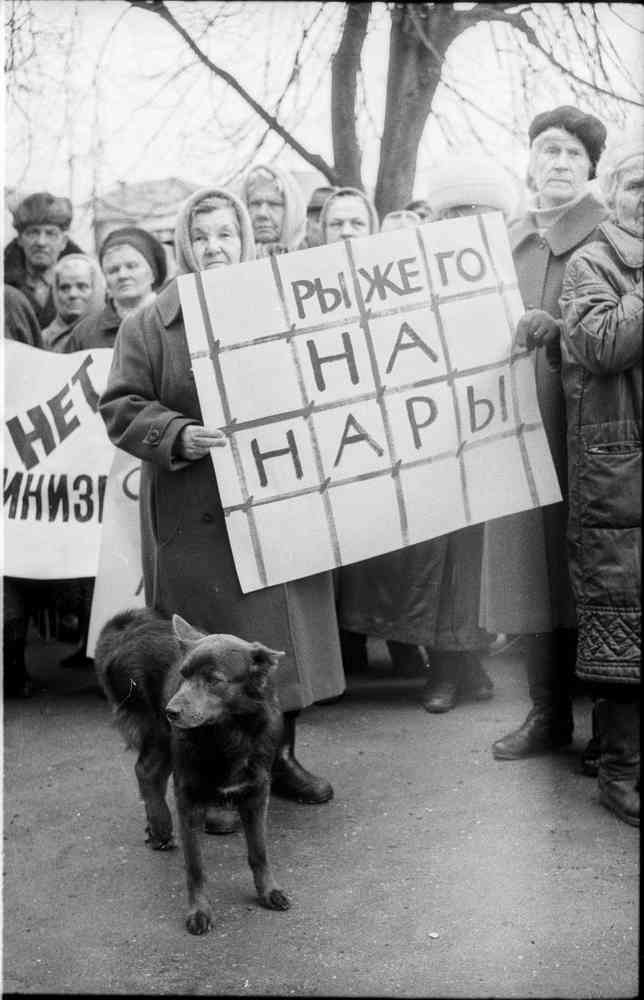
Russians protest an economic depression caused by reforms with a banner saying: "Jail the redhead!" Town of Pereslavl-Zalessky, 1998.

Privatization in Russia describes the series of post-Soviet reforms that resulted in large-scale privatization of Russia's state-owned assets, particularly in the industrial, energy, and financial sectors. Most privatization took place in the early and mid-1990s under Boris Yeltsin, who assumed the presidency following the dissolution of the Soviet Union.

Private ownership of enterprises and property had essentially remained illegal throughout the Soviet era, with Soviet Communism emphasizing national control over all means of production but human labor. Under the Soviet Union, the number of state enterprises was estimated at 45,000.

Privatization facilitated the transfer of significant wealth to a relatively small group of business oligarchs and New Russians, particularly natural gas and oil executives. This economic transition has been described as katastroika, which is a combination of catastrophe and the term perestroika, and as "the most cataclysmic peacetime economic collapse of an industrial country in history". A few strategic assets, including much of the Russian defense industry, were not privatized during the 1990s.

The mass privatization of this era remains a highly contentious issue in Russian society, with many Russians calling for revision or reversal of the reforms.

== Privatization during the Soviet Union ==
In the late 1980s, as part of the perestroika reformation movement, legislation championed by Mikhail Gorbachev—who pledged to build a "mixed socialist economy"—effectively transferred some controlling rights over enterprises from the government to the employees and management. In 1987, over the opposition of some of his allies, Gorbachev succeeded in passing a "law on state enterprise" through the Supreme Soviet of the Soviet Union, which granted work collectives a greater role in running enterprises. In 1988, the Law on Cooperatives legitimized "socialist cooperatives," which functionally operated as private companies and were permitted to directly deal with foreign companies, and reduced reliance on central planning. Later that year, private Soviet farmers were permitted to rent land from the state, purchase equipment, and hire workers, a significant step away from mandated collective farming following decades of dominance by state-owned agricultural concerns. The new regulations were seen as an effort to break state farms into smaller units and address critical food shortages in the Soviet Union, which failed to significantly increase food production.

The legislation also enabled these enterprises to withdraw from associations on their own, which led to the process of so-called spontaneous privatization in which control over some industrial assets was acquired by their managers. However, this accounted for only several thousand enterprises, a small fraction of the Soviet industry.

In September 1990, the Soviet parliament granted Gorbachev emergency privatization powers, including the authority to transform state enterprises into joint-stock companies with shares offered on stock exchanges.

One of the largest privatization efforts during the Soviet era was the transformation of the Ministry of Fuel and Energy into a joint stock company known as Rosneftgaz in September 1991.

In the months before the dissolution of the Soviet Union in December 1991, soon-to-be president Boris Yeltsin began assembling a team of economic reformers led by Yegor Gaidar, then a young reformist economist, and including Anatoly Chubais. The reform team initially considered Swedish social democracy as a model for Russia, but Gaidar opted instead to study Hungary as a template and was influenced by Poland's use of shock therapy. Both Gaidar and Chubais were convinced that despite Russia's uniquely non-capitalist economic history, a market economy could successfully take hold in the country. Following the August 1991 coup d'état attempt, the economic situation in the country dramatically worsened and an acute food shortage emerged. In October, Yeltsin delivered a speech in which he declared that price controls would be lifted on January 1, 1992, over Gaidar's recommendation that no specific date for the freeing of prices be given.

== Voucher privatization (1992–1994) ==
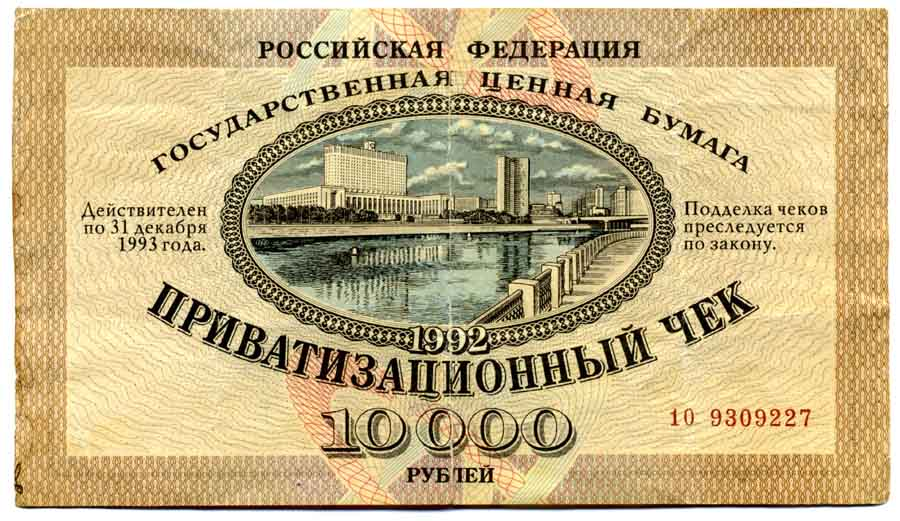
1992 privatization voucher

Privatization took place on a much wider scale in the early 1990s, when the government of Russia deliberately set a goal to sell its assets to the Russian public. Upon the Soviet Union's collapse, the new government was forced to manage the huge state enterprise sector inherited from the Soviet economy. According to a 1995 World Bank report (Development Brief No. 46, Russia: Creating Private Enterprises and Efficient Markets), by mid-1994 between 12,000 and 14,000 medium and large enterprises had been transferred into private hands. Around 40 million Russians became shareholders, and the voucher privatization program gave 144 million people the opportunity to become owners of enterprises. Privatization was carried out by the State Committee for State Property Management of the Russian Federation under Chubais with the primary goal being to transform the formerly state-owned enterprises into profit-seeking businesses, which would not be dependent on government subsidies for their survival. To distribute property quickly and to win over popular support, the reformers decided to rely mostly on the mechanism of free voucher privatization, which was earlier implemented in Czechoslovakia. The Russian government believed that the open sale of state-owned assets, as opposed to the voucher program, would have likely resulted in the further concentration of ownership among the Russian mafia and the nomenklatura, which they sought to avoid. Nevertheless, contrary to the government's expectations, insiders managed to acquire control over most of the assets, which remained largely dependent on government support for years to come. From 1992 to 1994, ownership of 15,000 firms was transferred from state control via the voucher program.

Thus, although several of the initial objectives had not been fully achieved by the end of the vouchers program, a great deal of assets did fall into private ownership remarkably quickly and worked to provide some basis for market competition. Voucher privatization took place between 1992 and 1994, and roughly 98 percent of the population participated. The vouchers, each corresponding to a share in the national wealth, were distributed equally among the population, including minors. They could be exchanged for shares in the enterprises to be privatized. Because most people were not well-informed about the nature of the program or were very poor, they were quick to sell their vouchers for money, unprepared or unwilling to invest. Most vouchers—and, hence, most shares—wound up being acquired by the management of the enterprises. Although Russia's initial privatization legislation attracted widespread popular support given its promise to distribute the national wealth among the general public and ordinary employees of the privatized enterprises, eventually the public felt deceived, with most people selling their vouchers to survive the economic collapse following the soviet dissolution.

=== Oil sector ===
Privatization of the oil sector was regulated by presidential decree No.1403 approved on November 17, 1992. Vertically integrated companies were created by joining some oil-producing enterprises and refineries into open-stock companies. Starting in 1994 many former state oil companies were privatized. This privatization had been partial because the federal government had obtained ownership positions in several companies and had also retained full control over the transport of oil to lucrative world markets.

== Loans for shares (1995–1996) ==
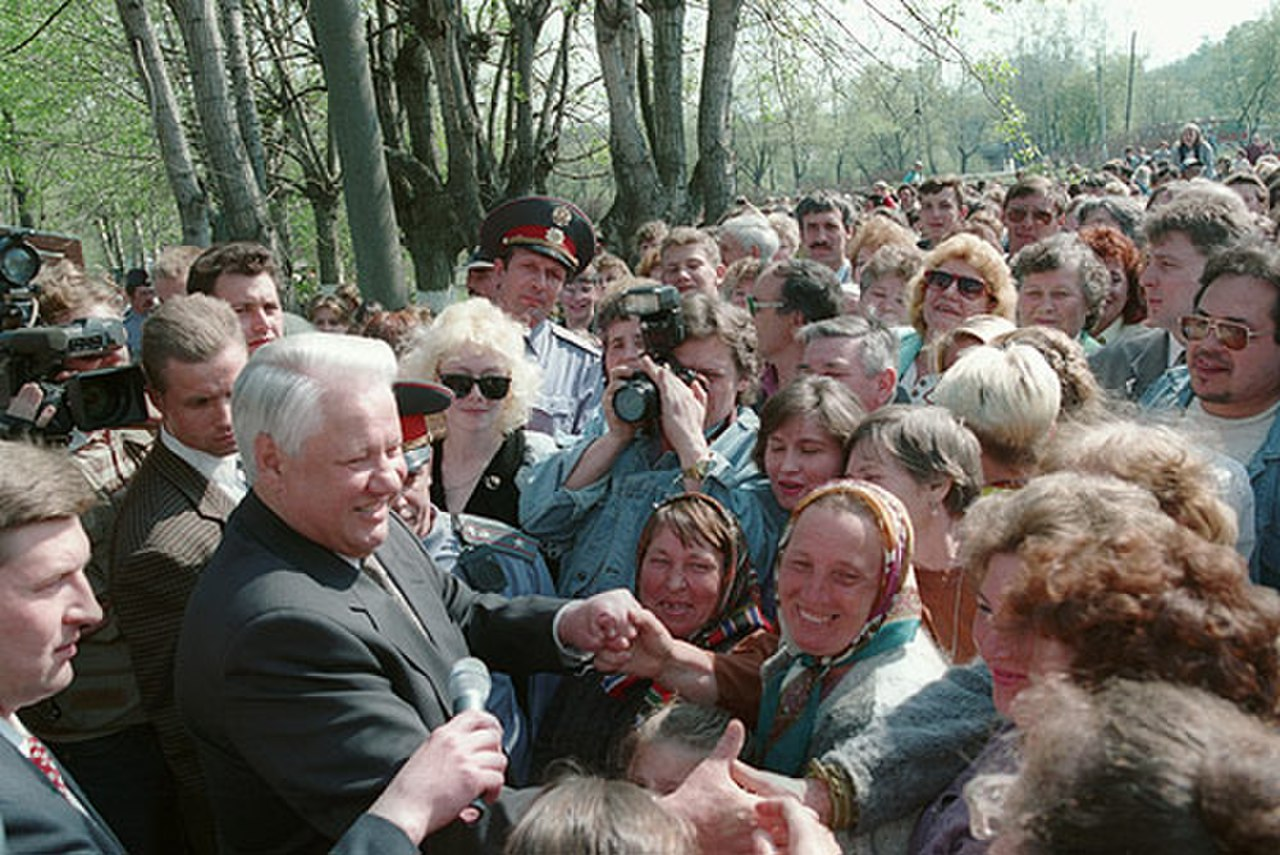
Yeltsin ahead of the 1996 presidential election

In 1995, facing severe fiscal deficit and in desperate need of funds for the 1996 presidential elections, the government of Boris Yeltsin adopted a "loans-for-share" scheme proposed by banker Vladimir Potanin and endorsed by Anatoly Chubais, then a deputy prime minister, whereby some of the largest state industrial assets (including state-owned shares in Norilsk Nickel, Yukos, Lukoil, Sibneft, Surgutneftegas, Novolipetsk Steel, and Mechel) were leased through auctions for money lent by commercial banks to the government. The auctions were rigged and lacked competition, being largely controlled by favored insiders with political connections or used for the benefit of the commercial banks themselves. As neither the loans nor the leased enterprises were returned in time, this effectively became a form of selling, or privatizing, state assets at very low prices.

== The first decade of the 2000s ==
From 2004 to 2006, the government took control of formerly privatised companies in certain "strategic" sectors: oil, aviation, power generation equipment, machine-building and finance. For example, the state-owned defense equipment company Rosoboronexport took control of Avtovaz, the primary producer of Russian cars. In June 2006, it took 60% control of VSMPO-Avisma, a company that accounts for two-thirds of the world's titanium production. In 2007, United Aircraft Building Corporation, a company that is 51% government controlled, combined all of the Russian companies producing aircraft.

== The 2010s ==
In December 2010, Russian President Dmitry Medvedev had ordered regional governments to decide on privatization of non-core assets by July 2011. Arkady Dvorkovich, then a top Kremlin economic aide, said regional privatization proceeds could amount to several billion rubles in 2011, and regional authorities must prioritize the sale of utility companies, financial institutions, manufacturing and transportation assets and the media.

In May 2012, after becoming prime minister, Medvedev said Russia should carry out its privatization program regardless of market volatility.

After a session of the World Economic Forum in October 2012, Medvedev said "It is vital for our country to continue the course towards privatization". He stressed that had assured participants in the World Economic Forum session that "does not want to see an economy totally controlled by the state".

In October 2017, Russian Minister for Economic Development Maxim Oreshkin told Reuters that "there are almost no fiscal reasons left for privatization", following an improving economy due to increased oil prices.

== The 2020s ==
The 2020s have seen a wave of nationalization, the reverse of the privatization that occurred after the fall of the Soviet Union. At least 200 businesses have been nationalized since the start of the Russian invasion of Ukraine.

== Analysis ==
The perceived failure of privatization in the 1990s resulted from a combination of factors:

- Most vouchers were issued to managers and employees of companies. Managers were able to use their positions to acquire disproportionate control of their companies; for example by forcing employees to sell their shares cheaply, and by using intimidation to exclude other buyers from auctions of company shares.
- The largest businesses were not part of the vouchers program at all, but rather were auctioned off at low prices to a handful of well-connected oligarchs.
- The resulting wealthy business owners, feeling that their own property rights were insecure in Russia, engaged in asset stripping to move value from their companies to investments overseas.

Overall, the effect was to concentrate ownership among a small number of private individuals, who in turn raided their companies for personal gain at the expense of their companies, the state, the general populace and the overall economy's success.

== See also ==
- Business oligarch
- Economic history of the Russian Federation
- History of post-Soviet Russia
- State-owned enterprises in Russia
- Semibankirschina (rule of seven bankers)

== General and cited references ==
- Freeland, Chrystia (2000). Sale of the Century: Russia's Wild Ride from Communism to Capitalism. New York: Crown Business. ISBN 978-0812932157.
- Hoffman, David E. (2001). The Oligarchs: Wealth and Power in the New Russia. New York, NY: PublicAffairs. ISBN 978-1-58648-001-1.
