= State-owned enterprises of Russia =

Important Russian economic sector

Russian government ownership of various companies and organizations, collectively known as state-owned enterprises (SOEs), play an important role in the national economy. The approximately 4,100 enterprises that have some degree of state ownership accounted for 39% of all employment in 2007 (down from over 80% in 1990). In 2007, SOEs controlled 64% of the banking sector, 47% of the oil and gas sector, and 37% of the utility sector.

State corporations are established by the Russian government to boost industrial sectors. Rosstat figures from early 2013 showed that 529,300 enterprises were partly or wholly owned by the state, of which approximately 31,000 were commercial companies (generating revenue). The 54 largest enterprises accounted for over two-thirds of the total revenues generated by state-owned organizations. SOEs accounted for 40% of the capitalization on the Russian stock market, one of the highest shares in the world.

== Legal form ==
Russian state-owned companies are typically established under the legal form of joint stock companies (OAO or ZAO), unitary enterprises (federal, regional or municipal), or state corporations.

=== Joint stock companies ===
OAO and PAO are forms of open joint-stock companies, while ZAO (and AO) are closed joint-stock companies.

The Federal Agency for State Property Management (Rosimushchestvo) is authorized by the Russian government to exercise shareholder rights for federally-owned shares in companies and is responsible for the preparation and nomination of candidates at the annual meetings of shareholders. As a general rule, Rosimushchestvo nominates to a company's board of directors representatives of the most relevant government body, based on the sectoral characteristics of the business. The sectoral state body thus participates in managing the company through its representatives.

=== Non-profit organizations ===
==== State corporation ====
A state corporation (Russian: государственная корпорация) defined by Article 7.1 of NCO Law is a non-profit organization which manages its assets as described in its charter. State Corporations are not obliged to submit to public authorities documents accounting for activities (except for a number of documents submitted to the Russian government) and, as a rule, are subordinate not to the government, but to the Russian president, and act to accomplish some important goal. Control by the Government is implemented on the basis of annual corporation meetings, an annual report on the audit opinion of accounting and financial reporting, as well as the conclusion of the auditing commission on the results of verification of financial statements and other corporation documents. Any other central government departments, organs of state power of subjects of the Russian Federation, and the local governments have no right to interfere in the activities of State corporations.

These state corporations established under a Russian federal law are different from all the other organizations referred to in mass media as "state corporations". According to the law, a state corporation is wholly owned by the Russian Federation directly, bypassing the Federal Agency for State Property Management.

==== State company ====
A state company (Russian: Государственная компания) defined by Article 7.2 of NCO Law is a non-membership non-profit organization. Each state company is created by a separate Russian federal law.

These state companies established only under a federal law are different from all the other organizations referred to in mass media as "state companies".

=== Unitary enterprise ===
A unitary enterprise (Russian: унитарное предприятие) is a commercial organization that has no ownership rights to the assets used in its operations. This form is possible only for state and municipal enterprises, operating with state or municipal property, respectively. The owners of the property of a unitary enterprise have no responsibility for its operation, and vice versa.

The assets of unitary enterprises belong to the central government (in which case they are known as federal state unitary enterprises), a Russian region, or a municipality. A unitary enterprise holds assets under the right of economic management (for both state and municipal unitary enterprises) or operative management (for state unitary enterprises only), and that such assets may not be distributed among the participants, nor otherwise divided. A unitary enterprise is independent in economic issues and obliged only to give its profits to the state. Unitary enterprises have no right to set up subsidiaries, but, with the owner's consent, can open branches and representation offices.

As of January 2017, there are 1,120 federal state unitary enterprises in Russia.

== Companies ==
Information on the legal form of companies is drawn from the open-data portal of the Federal Agency for State Property Management, unless otherwise stated.

Company	Type	Industry	State ownership
Aeroflot	OAO	Airline	51.173%
All-Russia State Television and Radio Broadcasting Company	Federal SUE	Broadcasting	
Almaz-Antey	ZAO	Aerospace & Defense	100%
ALROSA	PAO	Mining	43.9256%
Arkaim	OOO	Airline	
Atomflot	Federal SUE	Shipping	
AvtoVAZ	State corporation	Automotive	100%
Bazalt	AO	Defense	
Channel One Russia	AO	Broadcasting	38.9%
Deposit Insurance Agency of Russia	State corporation	Deposit insurance	100%
EZAN	Federal SUE	Telecommunication	
FGC UES	OAO	Energy	75%
Gazprom	PAO	Oil and gas	50.23%
Gazprom Neft	OAO	Oil and gas	
Inter RAO	PAO	Electricity	
Kamaz	AO	Automotive	
Krasnaya Zvezda State Enterprise	AO	Nuclear power	
Krylov State Research Center	Federal SUE	Shipbuilding	
Mayak	Federal SUE	Nuclear energy	
Mining and Chemical Combine	Federal SUE	Mining	
Moscow Metro	Regional SUE	Transport	
Mosenergo	OAO	Electricity	
Novorossiysk Commercial Sea Port	OAO	Shipping	20.0001%
Oboronprom	AO	Aerospace	
Research and Development Institute of Mechanical Engineering	Federal SUE	Rocket engines	
RIA Novosti	Federal SUE	News agency	disestablished in 2014
Rosatom	State corporation	Nuclear energy	100%
Roscosmos	State corporation	Space	100%
Rosenergoatom	AO	Nuclear power operation	
Rosneft	OAO	Oil and gas	50%
Rosselkhozbank	AO	Banking	71.9873%
Rosseti	PAO	Electric Power	88%
Rossiya Airlines	AO	Aviation	
Rostec	State corporation	Mixed	100%
Rostelecom	OAO	Telecommunications	56.8%
Ruselectronics	AO	Microelectronics	
RusHydro	OAO	Electric utility	60.4%
Rusnano	OAO	Nanotechnology	100%
Russian Agricultural Bank	AO	Infrastructure	72.4%
Russian Highways	State corporation	Infrastructure	100%
Russian Post	AO	Letter post	100%
Russian Railways	PAO	Infrastructure	100%
Russian Satellite Communications Company	Federal SUE	Telecommunications	
Russian Television and Radio Broadcasting Network (RTRS)	Federal SUE	Transmission towers	
Sberbank of Russia	PAO	Banking	51% (owned by the Central Bank)
Sevmash	AO	Shipbuilding	48.4966%
Sovcomflot	PAO	Shipping	100%
Soyuzmultfilm	Federal SUE	Animation studio	
TASS	Federal SUE	News agency	
Tactical Missiles Corporation	AO	Defense	100%
Techsnabexport	OAO	Nuclear energy	
Transneft	OAO	Oil and gas	100%
United Aircraft Corporation	PAO	Aerospace	91.11514696%
United Engine Corporation	AO	Aerospace	
United Grain Company	AO	Trading	50%
United Shipbuilding Corporation	AO	Shipbuilding	100%
Uralvagonzavod	AO	Defense	100%
Vnesheconombank	State corporation	Financial services	100%
VTB Bank	PAO	Banking	60.9%

== Privatization ==
Since the first waves of privatization in the 1990s, the Russian government has sold stakes in several companies, often while continuing to hold a significant degree of ownership. In 2016 this included the sale 10.9% of Alrosa, and 19.5% of Rosneft. Privatization plans for the 2017-2019 period include selling stakes in VTB (10.9%), Sovcomflot (25% minus 1 share), and Novorossiysk Commercial Sea Port.

== See also ==
- Federal Agency for State Property Management
- List of strategic organizations of Russia
- Media of Russia
- Privatization in Russia
