= Central Post Office (Dnipro) =

Post office in Dnipro, Ukraine

- Головпоштамт
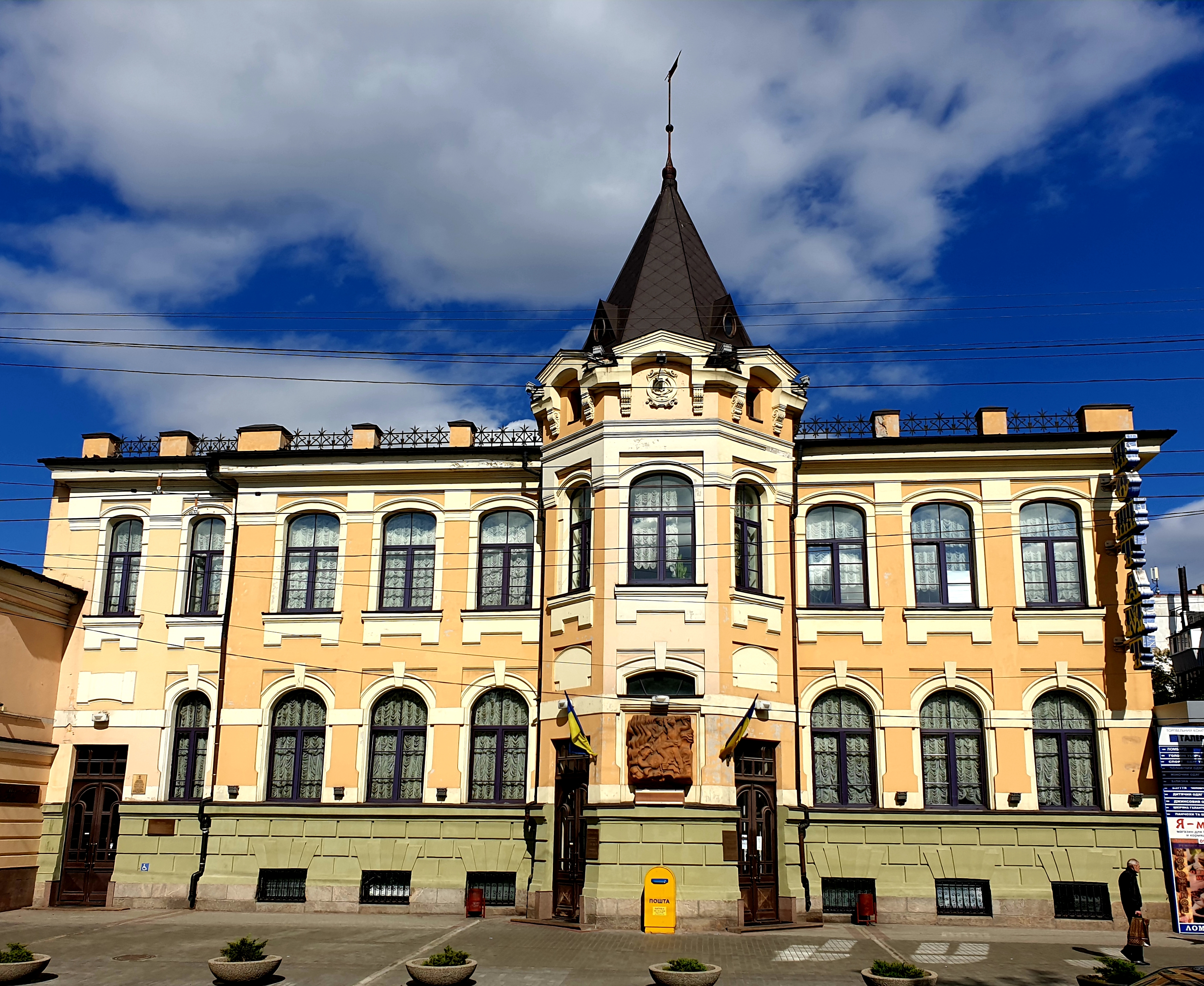
- The building in 2019
- Interactive map of the Central Post Office area

General information
- Status: Active
- Architectural style: Art Nouveau and Medieval Revival
- Location: Dnipro, Ukraine, Dmytro Yavornytsky Avenue
- Coordinates: 48°28′05″N 35°02′28″E
- Completed: September 1905
- Opened: 7 January 1906
- Renovated: 2000s
- Owner: Ukrposhta

Design and construction
- Architect: Vasyl Bocharov

Website
- www.ukrposhta.com

The Central Post Office (Ukrainian: Дніпровський головпоштамт, romanized: Dniprovskyi holovposhtamt) is a 20th-century building that formerly houses the Ukrposhta for the city of Dnipro, Ukraine. The building's tower has become one of the city's most recognizable landmarks, which rises majestically over the Dnieper River.

== Design ==
The new post office building is an intriguing example of a fusion of two styles: Art Nouveau and the historical trend in the era's architecture, which tended toward the architecture of medieval Europe. Additionally, the façade portion is solved by fusing contemporary and neo-Romanesque components (such as the tower), and the interior portion is done in the Art Nouveau style. The post office building was notable for its striking architecture and mirrored the structures of Central Europe. With an octagonal pointed tower, a sharply projecting portion highlights the two-story main volume.

== History ==
Long before the present building was built, around the end of the 18th century, the history of the post office in Ekaterinoslav started. In 1787, the telegraph office was founded, on the Dnieper River's right bank. The issue that a suitable post station was not constructed from the state's perspective from the outset of the local provincial city's foundation was brought up by the city's merchants in 1793, putting an exceptional load on themselves. An edict was published in 1797 stating that the populace, not the government, had to pay for the upkeep of post stations. Mikhail Vlasov, a merchant, took over the upkeep of the post station with four horses on 1 October 1797, at a fee of 300 rubles annually.

The post office was situated on Starodvoryanskaya Street in the early part of the 19th century (currently a location on 12 Plekhanov Street). Constructed in the early 1800s, the post station's one-story building was later rebuilt to include a mezzanine superstructure. Numerous important moments in the development of postal and telegraph communication history took place at the building. The first postal stamps issued in the Russian Empire arrived here and in other towns in December 1857. In this building's wing, on 8 October 1859, Ekaterinoslav's first postal and telegraph station opened. This location saw the operation of the first telephone exchange on 24 November 1897.

The building on 62 Karl Marx Avenue, where a house owned by nobleman Anton Schekutin formerly stood, is now home to the General Post Office of Dnipropetrovs'k. Previously, the office was situated on Starodvoryans'ka Street, which has since been renamed Plekhanova Street. The building was bought in 1839 so that Katerynoslav Post Service could be established there. Early in the 20th century, the post office building underwent significant renovations. Under the supervision of city architect Alexander Miklashevs'ky, engineers Panafutin and Sokolovych extensively altered the building's base. The main post and telegraph office were to be situated in the existing building, but a new one was built next to it in accordance with the plans of Saint Petersburg architect Vasyl Bocharov.

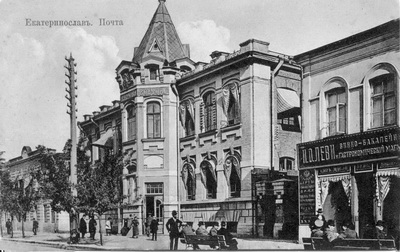
The new post office in 1914

Most of the new post office building was finished by the spring of 1905. After visiting Ekaterinoslav in September 1905, senior architect Nikonov of the Main Directorate of Posts and Telegraphs sent a report to Saint Petersburg stating that the work was done. By the end of December 1905, the plan to move the office to the new building was nearing completion. On 7 January 1906, the post office's new building opened. The new structure conveyed a desire for minimalism. The building's front side and gabled roof were designed in a modernist manner.

The 1917 Russian Revolution left its impact on the building, as did a protracted conflict between Red Guards and Haydamak forces who had taken control of this structure. After exchanging gunfire, the Red Guards emerged victorious on 29 December. The building's reconstruction took place in the 1930s and was completed in 1939. The structure survived the Great Patriotic War when the German occupants converted it into a barrack for soldiers.

In remembrance of the events of December 1917, a memorial plaque was placed on the new post office building in Soviet-era in 1953, directly above the entrance, with a new plauqe placed in 1976. The building was fully renovated in the early part of the new millennium, including the operation room and the facade.

Up until 2017, Ukrposhta was the owner of the post office. After that, the company was converted to a joint-stock company, and its authorized capital was given ownership of the post office building on Dmytro Yavornytsky Avenue, which was valued at about 93 million hryvnias. The company then went ahead and registered the building's private property right. In 2021, the Dnipro regional prosecutor's office filed a case to have the post office building on Dmytro Yavornytsky Avenue returned to state ownership.

== Gallery ==
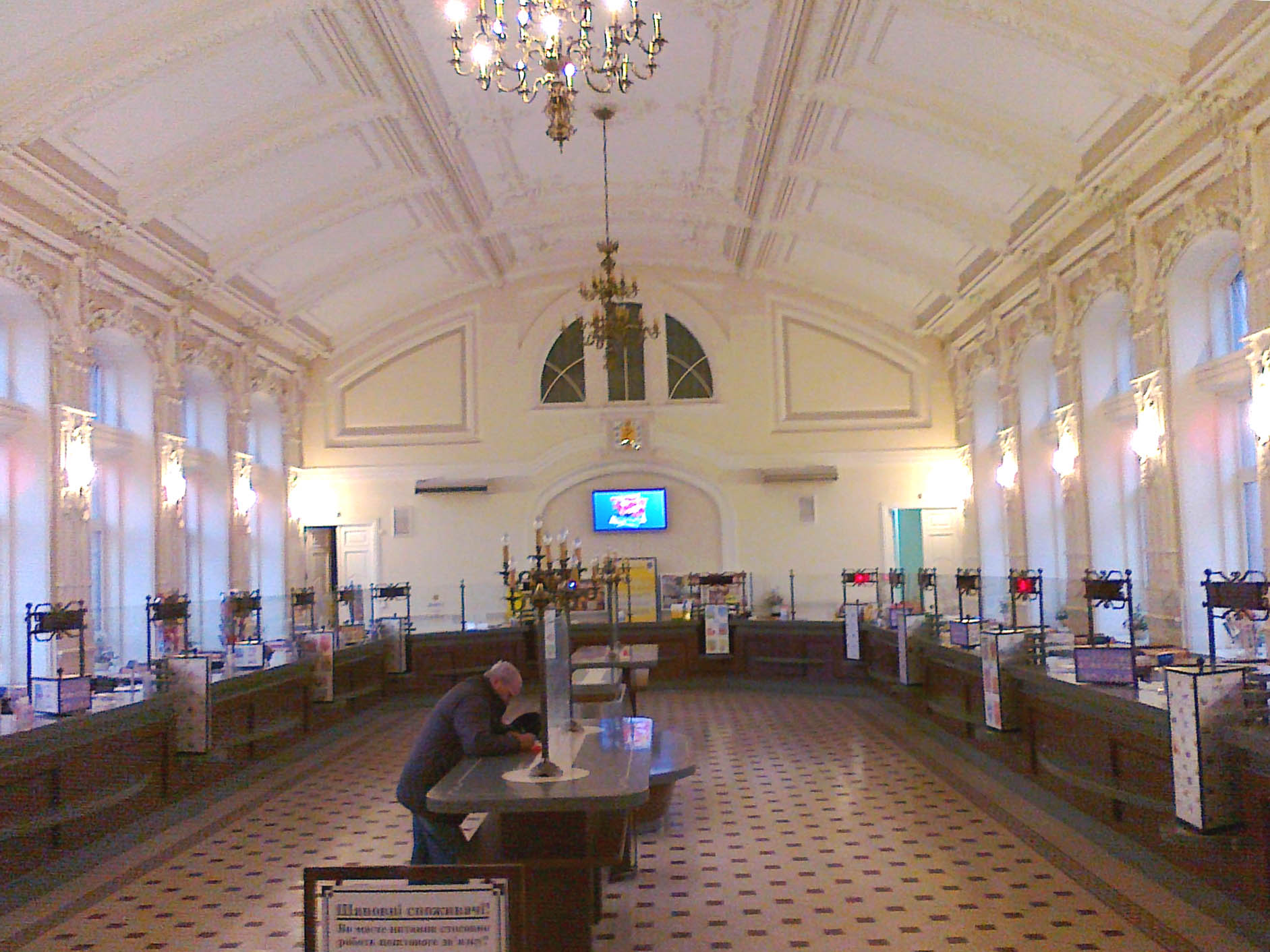
Interior of the post office in 2010

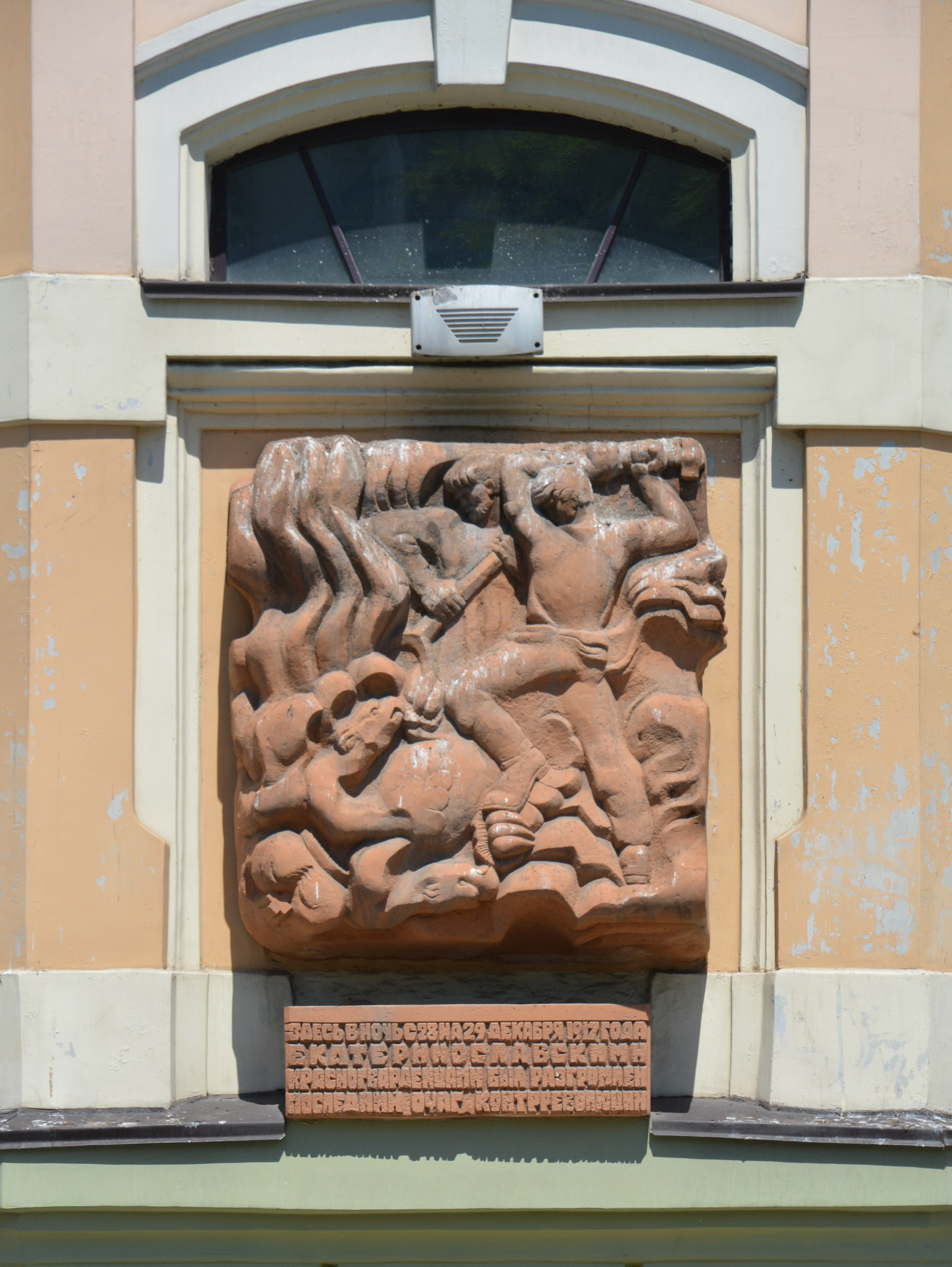
Commemorative plaque to the Russian Revolution in 2015

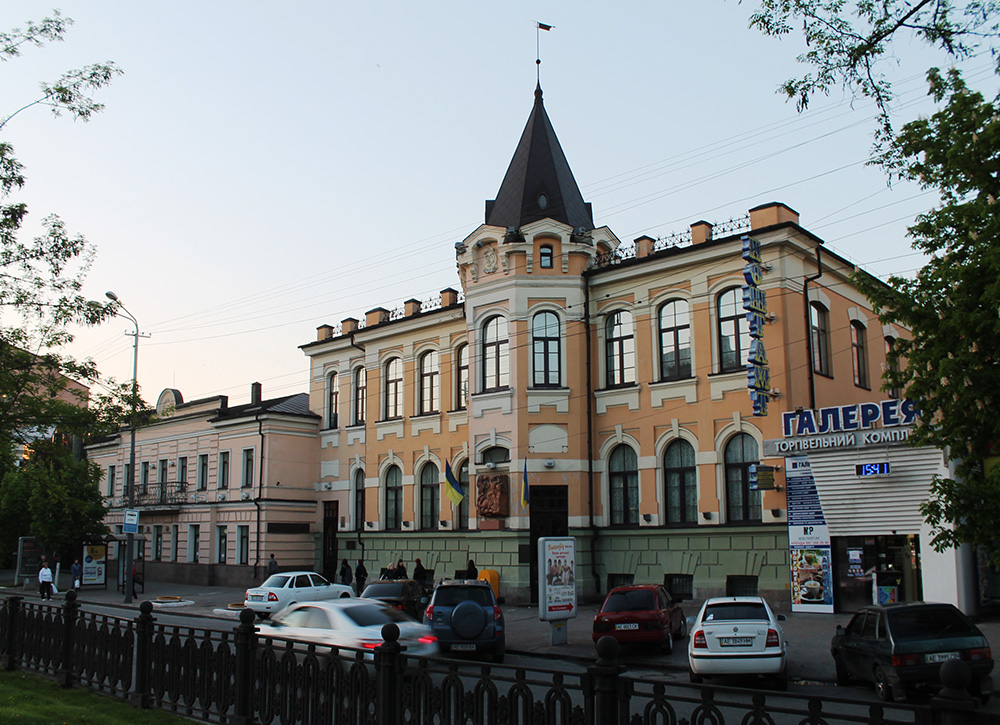
The old post office and new post office in 2016

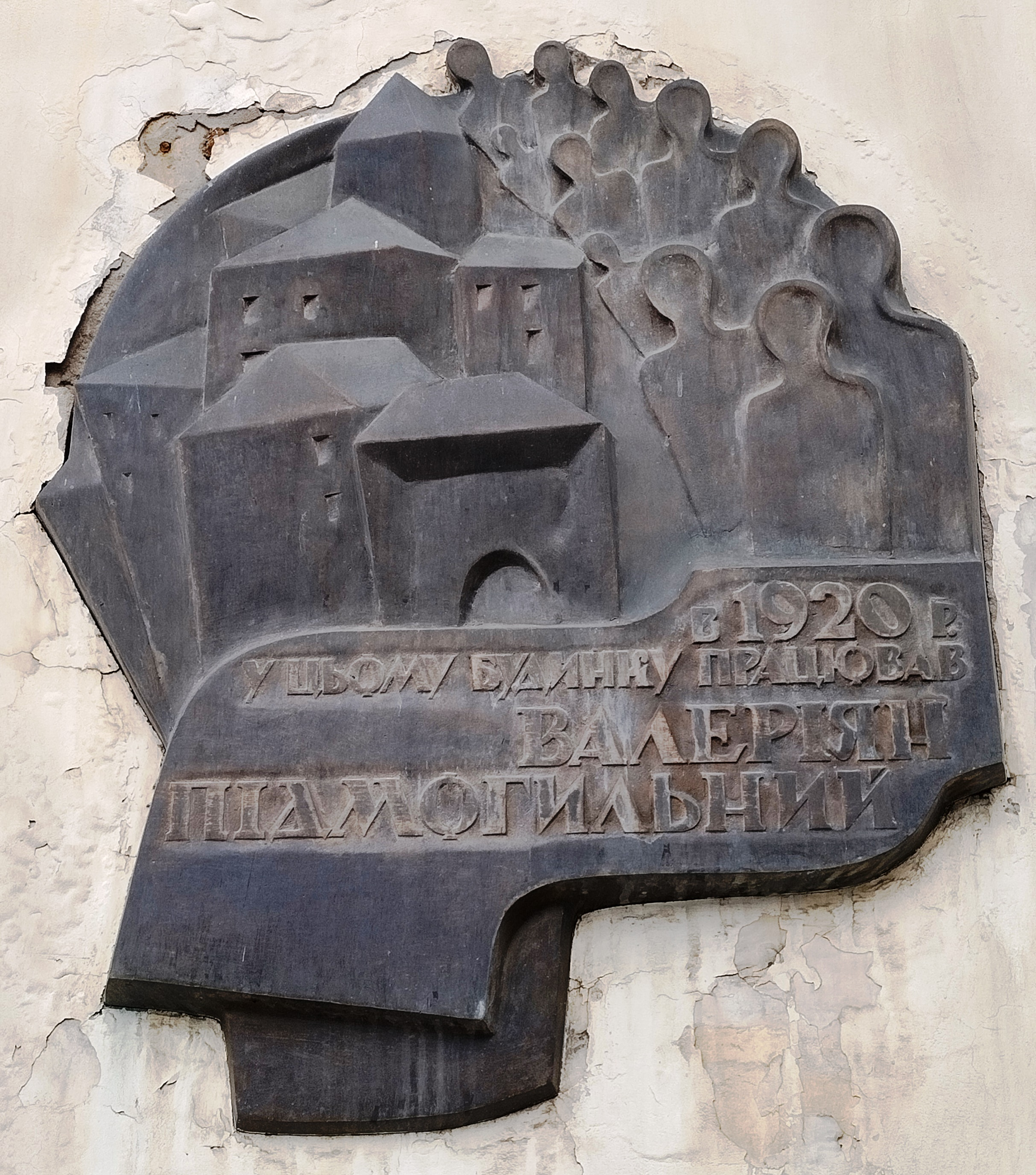
Commemorative plaque to Valerian Pidmohylny in 2021
