= Russian Broadcasting and Alert Networks =

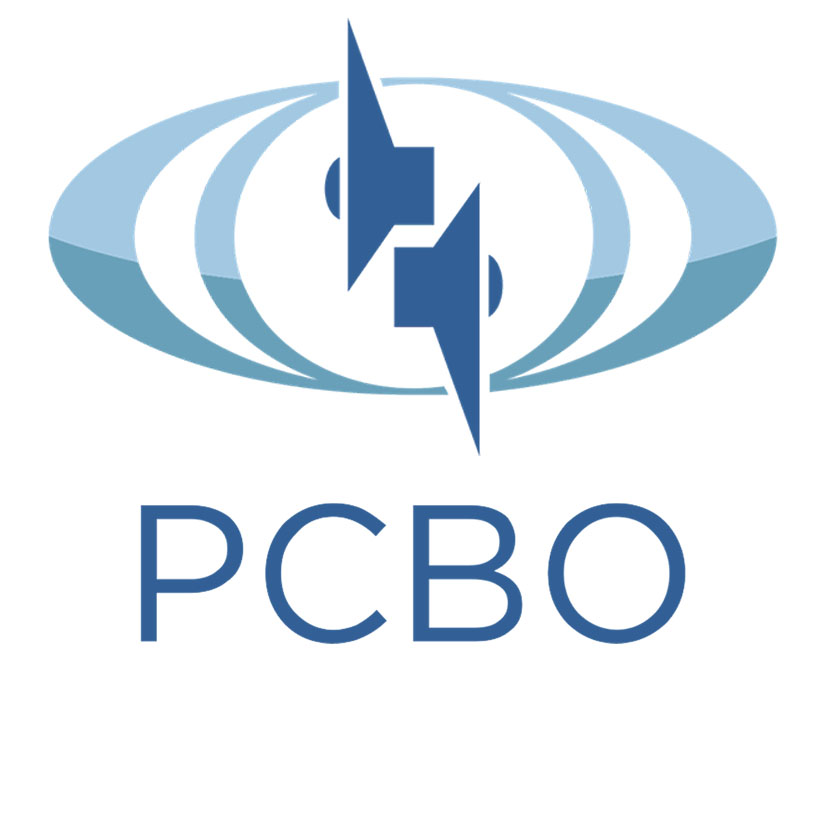
- Native name: ФГУП «РСВО»
- Industry: Broadcasting
- Founded: 1933
- Website: http://rsvo.ru

Federal Unitary Enterprise Russian Broadcasting and Alert Networks (Russian: Российские сети вещания и оповещения, Russian: ФГУП РСВО) is a wired radio operator alert in Moscow and St. Petersburg, they were established on June 24, 2013. The main activities are FSUE RSVO construction and operation of special alert networks, broadcast public radio, audio technical essential public service activities, including the Victory Day Parade on Red Square in Moscow. Wireline network (MF) in Moscow and St. Petersburg are the technical backbone systems emergency warning on these areas. The company has more than 2.9 million radio subscribers
