= Post of Crimea =

- Type: Federal State Unitary Enterprise
- Industry: postal services
- Founded: 2014
- Headquarters: Simferopol
- Revenue: $34.5 million (2017)
- Operating income: $333,803 (2017)
- Net income: $828,603 (2017; 2015)
- Total assets: $63.3 million (2017)
- Total equity: $12.8 million (2017)
- Number of employees: 4,500 (2015)
- Website: www.crimea-post.ru

Post of Crimea (Russian: Почта Крыма; Ukrainian: Пошта Криму; Crimean Tatar: Къырым почтасы) is a federal state unitary enterprise that carries out postal services in Crimea. It was created in 2014, following Russia's annexation of the peninsula. It is not a member of the Universal Postal Union.

One of its tasks is to integrate the postal system of Crimea with that of Russia. Ukrposhta stopped accepting mail and parcels destined for Crimea in April 2014.

Post of Crimea originates from Krympochta and Sevastopolpochta, two locally managed entities which were joined into a single federally owned company in December 2014. The company was originally intended to exist only for a short transition period, and to be subsequently merged into Russian Post.
