= Types of business entity in Russia =

There are three types of business entity in Russia: private limited company (Russian: общество с ограниченной ответственностью, lit. 'partnership with limited liability', abbreviated OOO), joint-stock companies (Russian: акционерное общество, lit. 'joint-stock partnership', abbreviated АО; in English as JSC), which may either be public (PJSC) or non-public (NJSC), and partnerships (Russian: товарищество, romanized: tovarishchestvo, lit. 'company'). All three are juridical persons (Russian: юр.лицо, lit. 'juridical persona')

== Private limited companies ==
Limited Liability Company (OOO), Russian: Общество с ограниченной ответственностью are by far the most popular type of legal entity in Russia. They are similar to Limited liability partnership or Limited liability company in other countries.

LLC is set up by one or several persons (legal entities and/or individuals), its charter capital is divided into participatory shares, and LLC participants are not liable for company's obligations and bear the risk of losses to the extent of the contributions made by them. The number of shareholders may not exceed 50.

Their owners are legally responsible for their debts only to the extent of the amount of capital they invested. The minimum capital required is 10,000 Russian rubles. Private company registration takes three business days and is performed by the Federal Taxation Service.

Private companies with annual income below 200 million Rubles and having no more than 130 employees are eligible for simplified taxation.

LLC is the most popular legal entity because of simple registration and simplified taxation. LLC can be registered within 3 business days after submitting the documents. In most cases LLCs are eligible for simplified taxation: 15 per cent profits tax or 6 per cent income tax.

== Joint-stock companies ==
Prior to 2014 there were two types of Russian joint-stock companies, Open joint-stock company and Close joint-stock company. Following a change in legislation from 2014, these were replaced with Public joint-stock company and Nonpublic joint-stock company. Founders of a joint-stock company sign a written agreement for its formation. This agreement establishes procedures for creating the company, such as the size of authorized capital, types and categories of shares, cost of shares, the order for settling payments, and the rights and responsibilities of the founders. This agreement then becomes the organization charter, which contains information on the name of the company, the locations of offices, the type of company (public/open (ОАО, OJSC) or private/closed (ЗАО, CJSC)), as well as other specific information on shares, capital, and so on. The company shares allotted upon founding the company must be fully paid within a year from the company's foundation unless a shorter period is required by the founding contract. However, at least half of the shares must be paid within three months, starting from the state registration of the company. Though a share which has been paid does not necessarily give voting rights to its owner.

Joint-stock companies were required to register the issue of shares with the Russian Federal Securities Market Commission so that shares can be traded either publicly (for an OAO) or among a limited number of people (for a PJSC). For the registration, a set of documents must be submitted to the FSMC, and the procedure usually takes 30 days to enact.

Since 1 September 2014 there have been some changes enacted in the Russian Civil Code:

- Joint-stock companies can be Public joint-stock company and nonpublic – they are no longer called "open" and "closed", respectively. A Public joint-stock company is like an OAO (shares are publicly traded). Moreover, it is important to have the word "public" in the name of the company. All companies which were JSC before, should become OOO and have to correct the type of company in their founding documents (charter).
- The statutory minimum charter capital is 5,000 Russian minimum wage rates (in 2014, the minimum wage rate was 5,554 roubles).

=== Disadvantages ===
While a joint-stock company presents several advantages compared to a typical business establishment, the burden of creating a JSC typically outweighs that of a private limited company. This is especially true in Russia where the abnormally excessive legal and bureaucratic challenges facing prospective entrepreneurs typically dissuade most from starting a JSC. Without the need to issue shares in a private limited company, it makes private limited companies much more flexible when the need arises for members to change the charter capital of the company. Furthermore, a private limited company can collectively or individually hold at least a 10% interest in the company's charter capital, and it does not have the power to request a court expel another participant. All of this is not possible in a joint-stock company, or prohibitively difficult.

=== Defunct types ===
==== Open joint-stock company ====
An open joint-stock company (открытое акционерное общество, abbreviated "OJSC" in English, "ОАО" in Russian) is a legal entity where shares may be publicly traded without the permission of other shareholders. An OAO can distribute its shares to an unlimited number of shareholders and sell them without limitations. The statutory minimum charter capital is 100,000 Russian roubles.

==== Closed joint-stock company ====
A closed joint-stock company (закрытое акционерное общество, abbreviated "CJSC" in English, "ЗАО" is Russian) is a legal entity whose shares are distributed among a limited number of shareholders – maximum 50. The statutory minimum charter capital is 10,000 Russian roubles.

== State-owned corporations ==
In Russia, a JSC can be completely or partially owned by the federal government. Such JSCs are different from another type of state-controlled company, the unitary enterprise (a commercial organization that operates state-owned assets). State-owned JSCs do not own or operate any state property and the state acts just like an ordinary shareholder.

Some state-owned public corporations were formerly government agencies in the Soviet Union which were reorganized into completely state-owned JSCs in 1992–1993 to undergo a transition to a fully independent business. The management and the board of directors in such state-owned corporations were appointed by the Council of Ministers/the government and included top government officials and ministers. The largest of such corporations were initially incorporated as Russian joint-stock companies (Russian: Российское акционерное общество, abbreviated as RAO). Best known examples were RAO UES and RAO Gazprom. But they have since been converted to public JSCs (OAO), even though their shares remain the property of the government.

Less important JSCs, or the JSCs only partially owned by the government, are managed through the Federal Agency for State Property Management (Rosimushchestvo).

A specific type of state-owned corporation is called State corporation and is created by the virtue of law, usually to address a specific goal of the government. These companies have a wider social goal rather than just money making, hence they are not operating in the standard.

== Individual entrepreneur ==
Individual entrepreneur (IP, Russian: Индивидуальный предприниматель) is an individual registered in accordance with the procedure established by law and carrying out entrepreneurial activity without forming a legal entity. Following the dissolution of the Soviet Union and the economic liberalization in the 1990s, a number of terms were used in the legislative acts of the Russian Federation which since the 2000s have been consistently replaced by the single term Individual Entrepreneur.

An important feature of carrying out entrepreneurial activity as an individual entrepreneur is the fact that an individual is liable for his obligations with all property belonging to him (i.e. there is no principle of limitation of liability), with the exception of property that cannot be recovered by law. Unlike, for example, a participant in a limited liability company, where the participant is liable for the obligations of the company founded by him in most cases only within the limits of his share in the authorized capital of this company and in no case with his personal property. This essential fact refers to the main disadvantage of this form of doing business.

State registration and further activities of individual entrepreneurs are regulated by the Federal Law of the Russian Federation "On State Registration of Legal Entities and Individual Entrepreneurs" No. 129-FZ, the Civil Code of the Russian Federation, other federal laws of the Russian Federation, as well as Orders of the Government of Russia.

Registration is done by the Unified State Register of Individual Entrepreneurs which is managed by the Federal Tax Authority. Registration can be carried out at his place of residence, or, in the absence of one, at the place of stay.

Since 2011, the requirements for document execution have been simplified: when submitted in person to the Federal Tax Service, the documents are not certified by a notary; when terminating activities, an individual entrepreneur does not need to provide a certificate from the Pension and Social Insurance Fund of Russia. After accepting the report, the Pension and Social Insurance Fund itself provides a certificate to the Federal Tax Service in electronic form; at the same time, in some regions, it is not even necessary to provide a report before closing the individual entrepreneur.

== Other types ==
- Autonomous nonprofit organization (ANO, Russian: Автономная некоммерческая организация, АНО)
- Unitary state enterprise (GP or GUP, Russian: Государственное унитарное предприятие, ГП or ГУП)
- Investment fund (Russian: Фонд, "fund")
- Production Cooperative (PK, Russian: Производственный кооператив, ПK)

== See also ==
- Unified State Register of Legal Entities
