= Popov Plant =

Coordinates: 56°18′46″N 43°57′04″E

- Type: Open Joint Stock Company
- Founded: 1916
- Headquarters: Nizhniy Novgorod, Russia
- Website: www.gzas.ru

Popov Plant (Russian: ГЗАС имени А. С. Попова) is a company based in Nizhniy Novgorod, Russia.

The Popov Plant has been engaged in radioelectronic work since 1952 and has particular expertise in aircraft-related systems and electronic medical equipment. It manufactures ground and airborne aviation radio communications equipment and complexes, radio centers, MF and HF radio stations of various applications.

== Products ==
- Medical equipment
- Radio and television transmitting equipment, electronic means of communication
- Weapons and ammunition

== Trademarks ==
- Alfa-Impuls (Russian: АЛЬФА-ИМПУЛЬС) (23.06.2021)
- Trademark №223387 (02.10.2002)
- The health line (Russian: ЛИНИЯ ЗДОРОВЬЯ) (08.04.2013)

== Management ==
CEO – Vladimir Yuryevich Dryakhlov
