= Ukrposhta =

Ukrainian national postal services company

Ukrposhta JSC
- Logo used since 2026

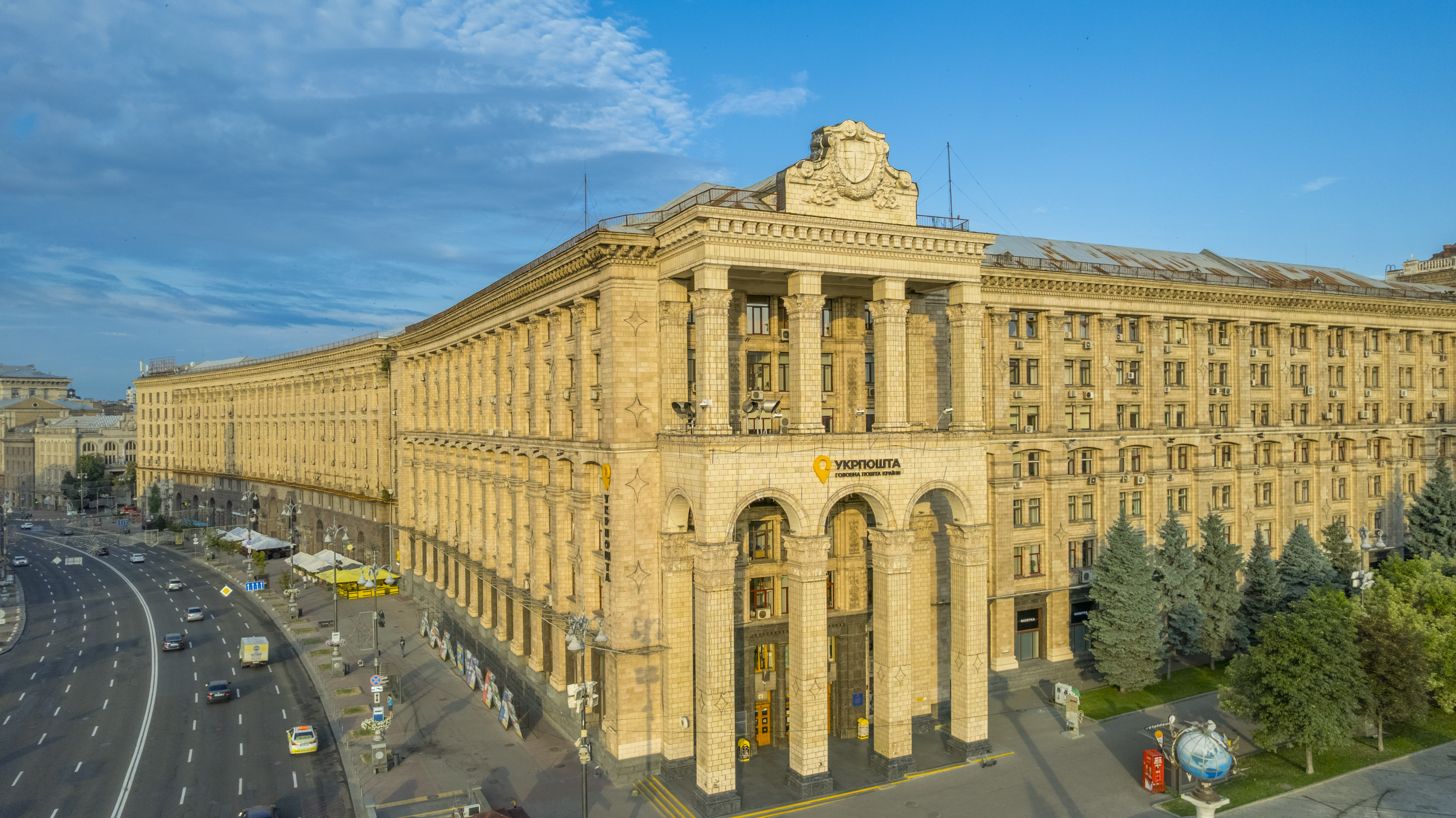
- Central Post Office, headquarters in Kyiv
- Native name: Укрпошта
- Formerly: List: Ukrainian Union Posts Ukrposhta (1993–1998) (Note: Also known as Ukrainian Postal Association Ukrposhta, Ukrainian: Українське об'єднання поштового зв'язку «Укрпошта», romanized: Ukrainske obiednannia poshtovoho zviazku «Ukrposhta».); Ukrainian State Enterprise of Posts Ukrposhta (1998–2017) (Note: Also known as Ukrainian State Postal Enterprise Ukrposhta, Ukrainian: Українське державне підприємство поштового зв'язку «Укрпошта», romanized: Ukrainske derzhavne pidpryiemstvo poshtovoho zviazku «Ukrposhta».); Public Joint Stock Company Ukrposhta (2017–2018) (Note: Ukrainian: Публічне акціонерне товариство «Укрпошта», romanized: Publichne aktsionerne tovarystvo «Ukrposhta».)
- Type: State owned joint-stock company (since 2015)
- Industry: Postal and public services
- Founded: 1947 (member of Universal Postal Union and Soviet Post)
- Headquarters: 22 Khreshchatyk street, Kyiv, Ukraine, 01001
- Key people: Ihor Smilianskyi (Director)
- Services: Mail, express mail, parcel post, commercial delivery, freight forwarding, third-party logistics, transfer payment (utilities payments, subscriptions and pensions distribution, other money transfers)
- Revenue: ▲UA₴ 1,831 million (the first 6 months of 2015)
- Total assets: 11,538,899,000 hryvnia (2025)
- Owner: Government of Ukraine
- Number of employees: 32,000 (2026)
- Parent: Ministry for Reconstruction, Infrastructure and Transport of Ukraine
- Website: ukrposhta.ua/en

JSC Ukrposhta (Ukrainian: Укрпошта) is the national postal service of Ukraine with 100% state ownership, which provides universal postal, logistics, financial and courier services throughout the country. Located in the Central Post Office in the center of Kyiv on Khreshchatyk street in the Maidan Nezalezhnosti, Ukrposhta includes 24 regional branches, the Mail Processing and Transportation Directorate and the Autotransposhta Directorate, 4,273 stationary and 1,867 mobile post offices, which serve 20,204 settlements in Ukraine. From 1999–2015 it was a unitary enterprise of the government of Ukraine. Ukrposhta has been a member of Universal Postal Union since 1947.

== History ==
Logo in 1992–2009

Logo in 2000s (on Kyiv regional department site)

Logo 2009 to 2017

Logo from 2017 to 2026

Seal used on some stamps and mailboxes

Ukrposhta operated within the Soviet Ministry of Telecommunications (Administration of Postal Communication) as its republican branch on territory of the Ukrainian SSR and was centered in Moscow. The Ukrainian SSR did not have a separate system of telecommunications and was completely integrated within the Soviet system of telecommunications. As part of the Gorbachev reforms (perestroika and decentralization, see Union of Sovereign States), in 1991, Ukrtelecom was created in Soviet Ukraine which took over administration of all means of communication such as postal and signal.

In 1994 Ukrposhta started to operate as a separate business entity following the restructuring of Ukrtelecom, after which Ukrposhta has been providing postal service, while Ukrtelecom has been providing telephone and telegraph services.

In July 1998, Ukrposhta was reformed again on a government request.

It is currently managed by the Ministry of Infrastructure of Ukraine and the Cabinet of Ministers of Ukraine decrees.

Ukrposhta's activities are regulated by the Law of Ukraine "On Postal Service" (in force since 4 October 2001) and other laws including regulations of the UPU.

In 2022, JSC Ukrposhta directed over 150 million UAH to humanitarian and charitable needs: support for business relocation and business support, delivery of important humanitarian cargoes (over a thousand 20-ton trucks), joint with Ukrzaliznytsia payments to passengers of evacuation trains, transferring AFU equipment, military gear, generators, medications, etc., supporting educational projects and helping animals.

In July 2023, the European Bank for Reconstruction and Development (EBRD) reallocated part of a previously allocated loan to enhance the operational resilience of "Ukrposhta." €22.7 million will go towards the purchase of over 5000 electric bicycles and about 350 trucks.

In April 2024, it was reported that Ukrposhta is selling 531 units of outdated transport — cars, trucks, trailers, semi-trailers, tractors — on the ProZorro platform.

On May 9, 2024, the Verkhovna Rada of Ukraine supported bill No. 8423, which allows Ukrposhta's employees to carry and use firearms for the protection of postal funds and facilities from attacks.

== Impact of events in 2014 ==
The events of 2014 narrowed the scope of the company's geographical activities: in April of 2014, Ukrposhta ceased operations in Crimea and Sevastopol, and in December left the territories of the unrecognized DPR and LPR. On the basis of its infrastructure in these regions, the “Post of Crimea” (from April 21), “Post of Donbass” (from December 2) and “LNR Post” appeared respectively. For reference, as of the beginning of 2014, Ukrposhta had 553 post offices and 221 vehicles to transport mail to Crimea. About 4.7 thousand people, or about 5% of its workforce, were involved in the directorates of Ukrposhta on the peninsula.

Starting from March 27, 2014, postal items sent by Ukrposhta from the mainland of Ukraine are not accepted by the postal service of Crimea and Sevastopol and are returned. Under these circumstances, Ukrposhta is not able to forward postal items to the Crimean Peninsula. Given the current situation, Ukrposhta has suspended the acceptance of postal items to Crimea.

== Violation ==
Based on the supervisory actions of the National Bank of Ukraine regarding the activities of Ukrposhta in 2023–2026, during which the NBU issued several written warnings and fines against Ukrposhta for violations of payment services, financial monitoring, and deficiencies in risk management and internal control, on June 23, 2026, the Committee on Supervision and Regulation of Banking Activities, Supervision of Payment Systems of the NBU ruled that the General Director of Ukrposhta, Ihor Smilyansky, does not meet the professional suitability requirements established for the head of a financial payment services provider, and decided to remove him from his duties and appoint a new head.

== Gallery ==
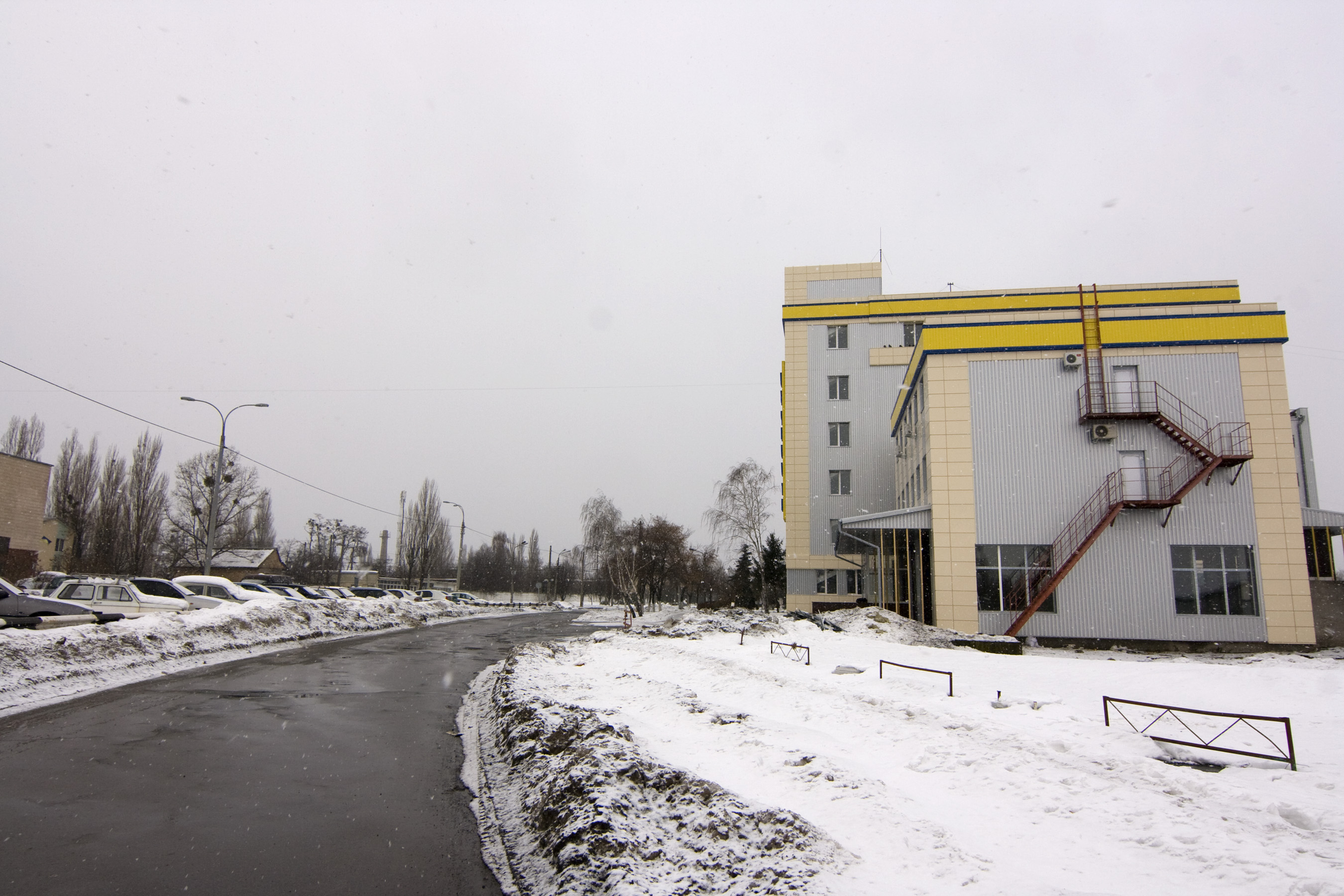
Avtotransposhta Directorate in the Kyiv right-bank Chokolivka

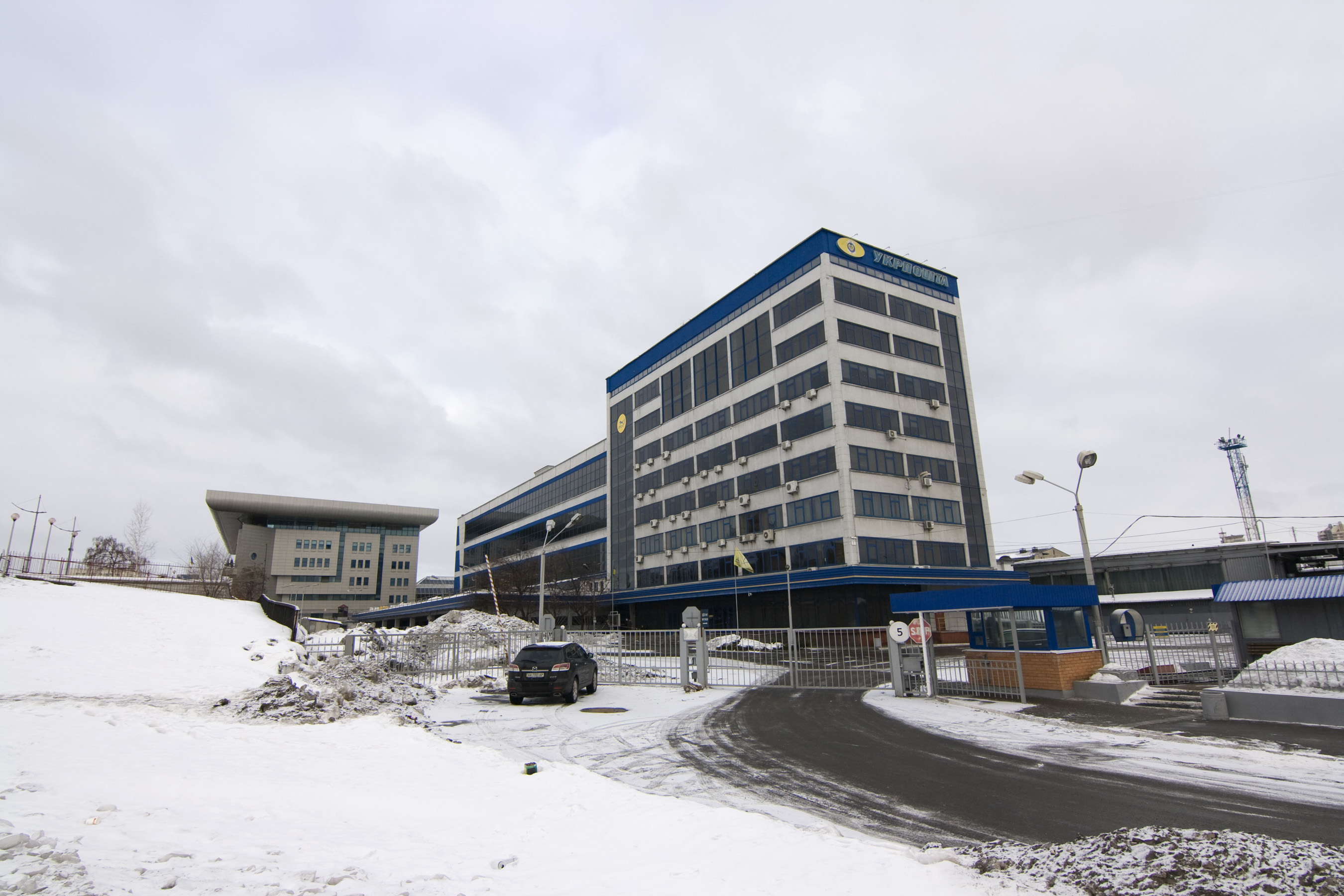
Railway terminal in the Kyiv right-bank Solomyanka

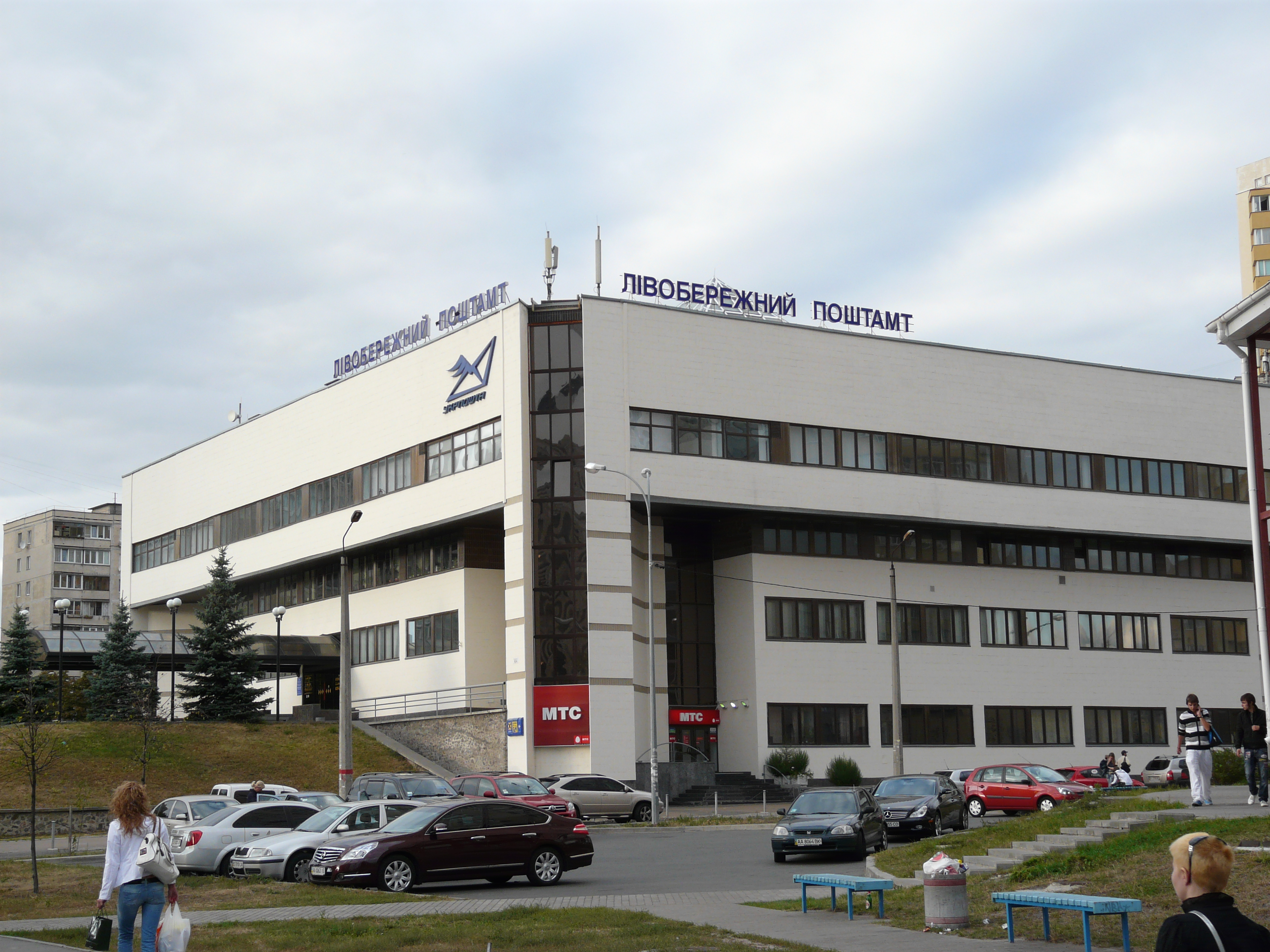
Left Bank Post Office in Kyiv's Livoberezhnyi Masyv

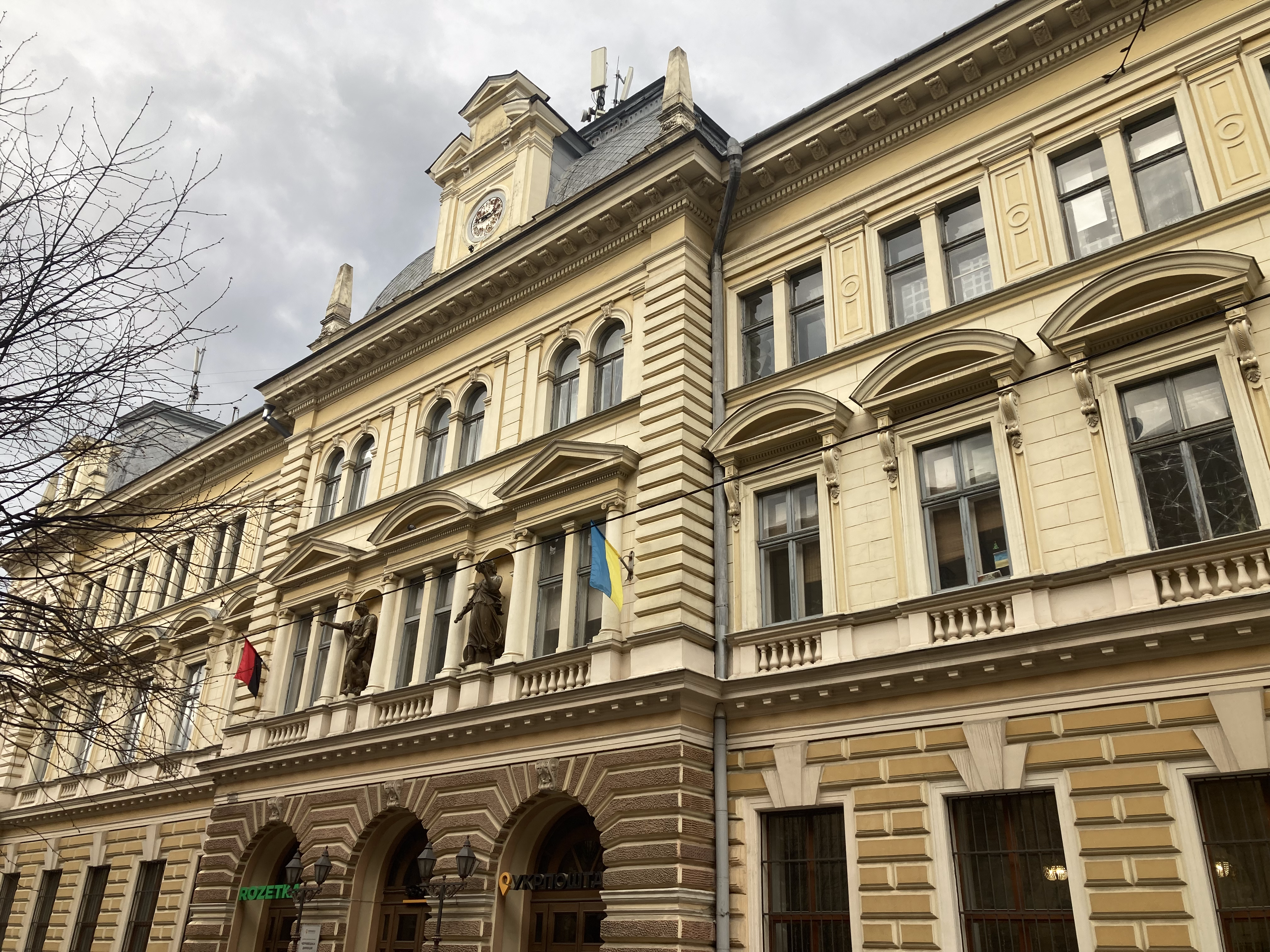
Chernivtsi Main Post Office

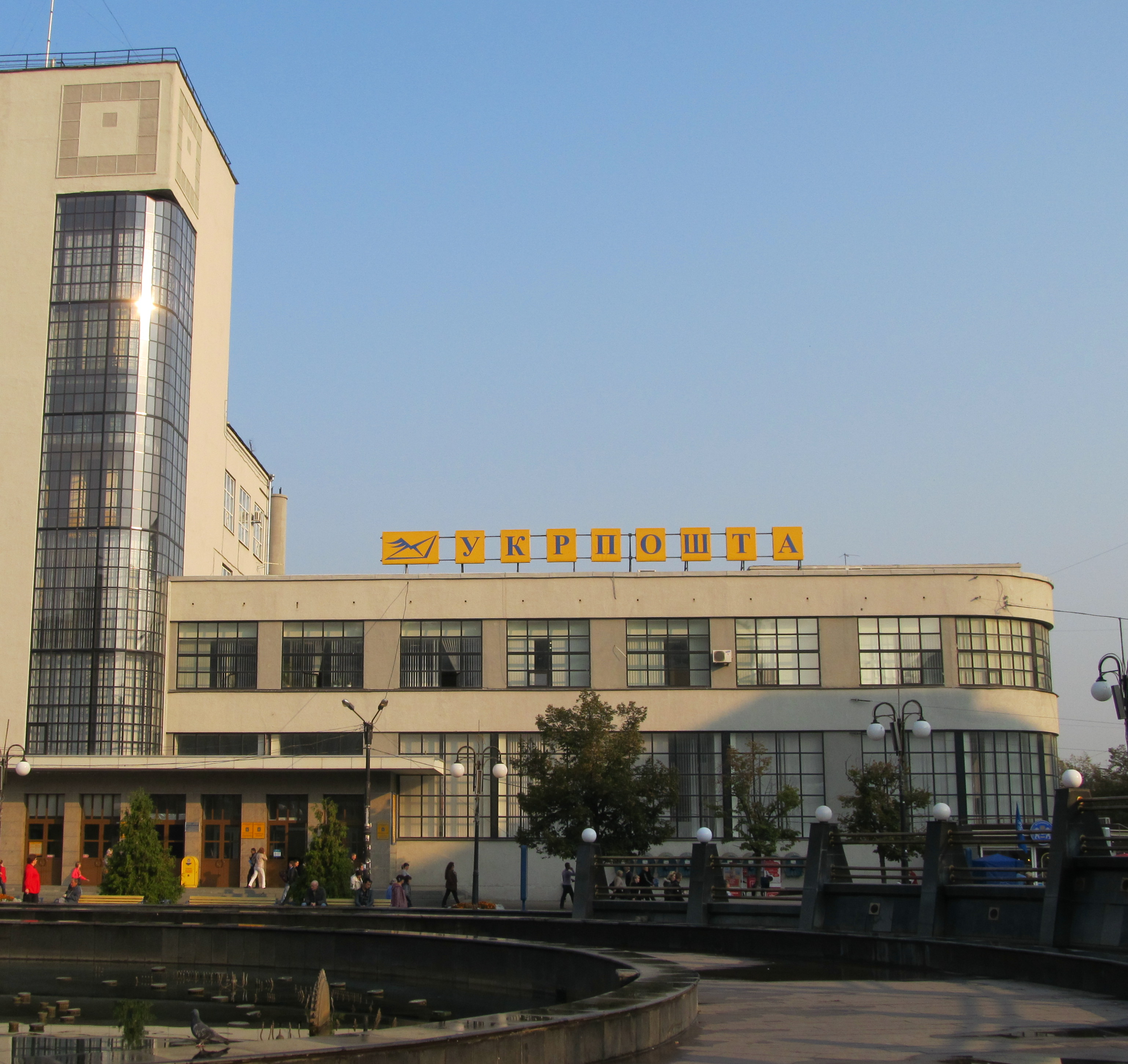
Kharkiv Main Post Office

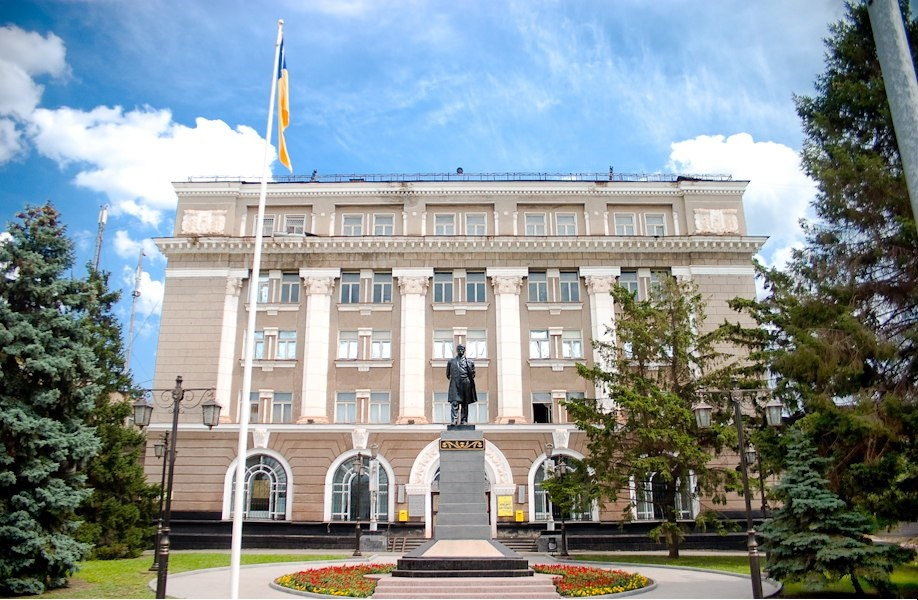
Kryvyi Rih Main Post Office

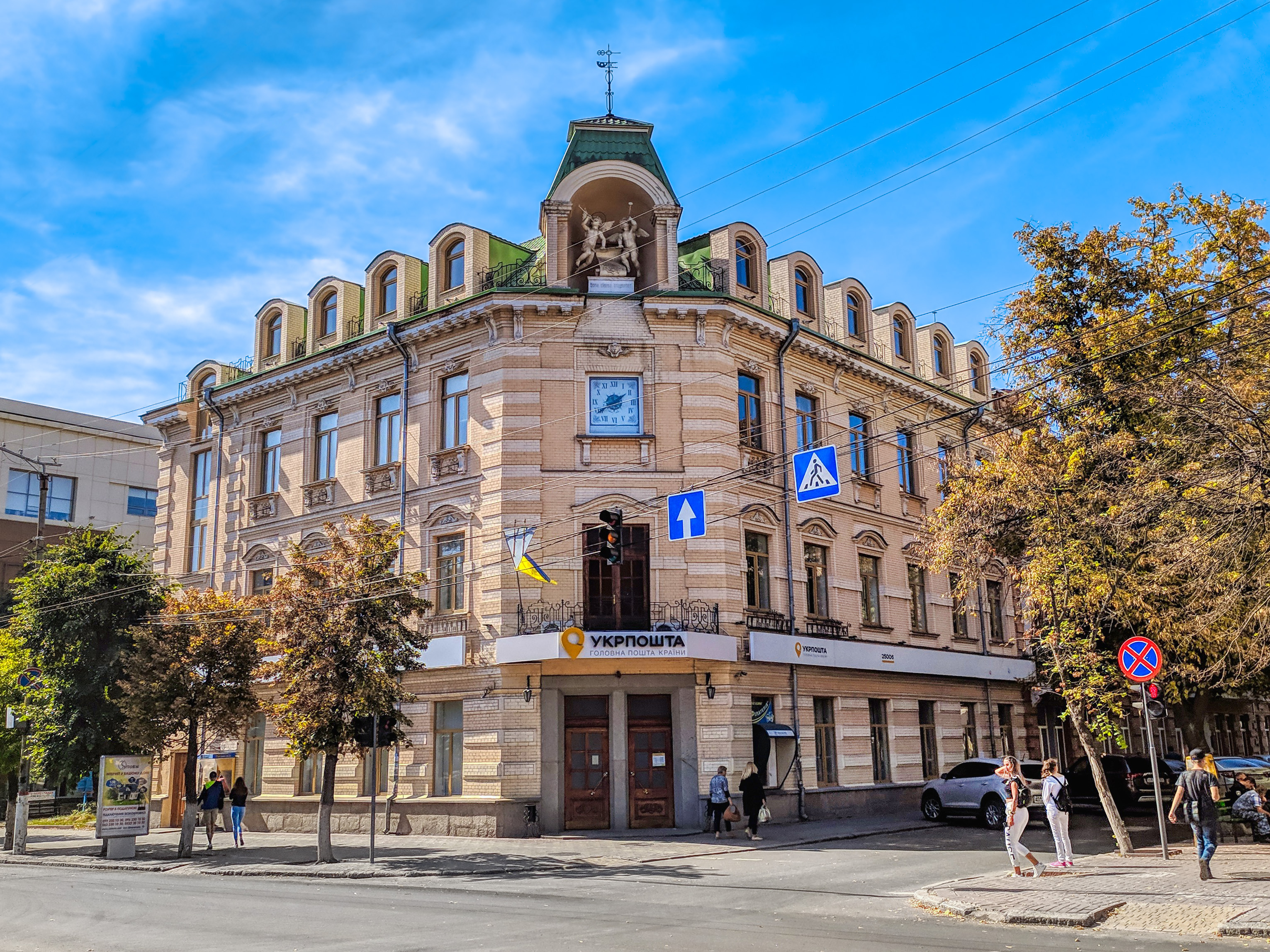
Kropyvnytskyi Main Post Office

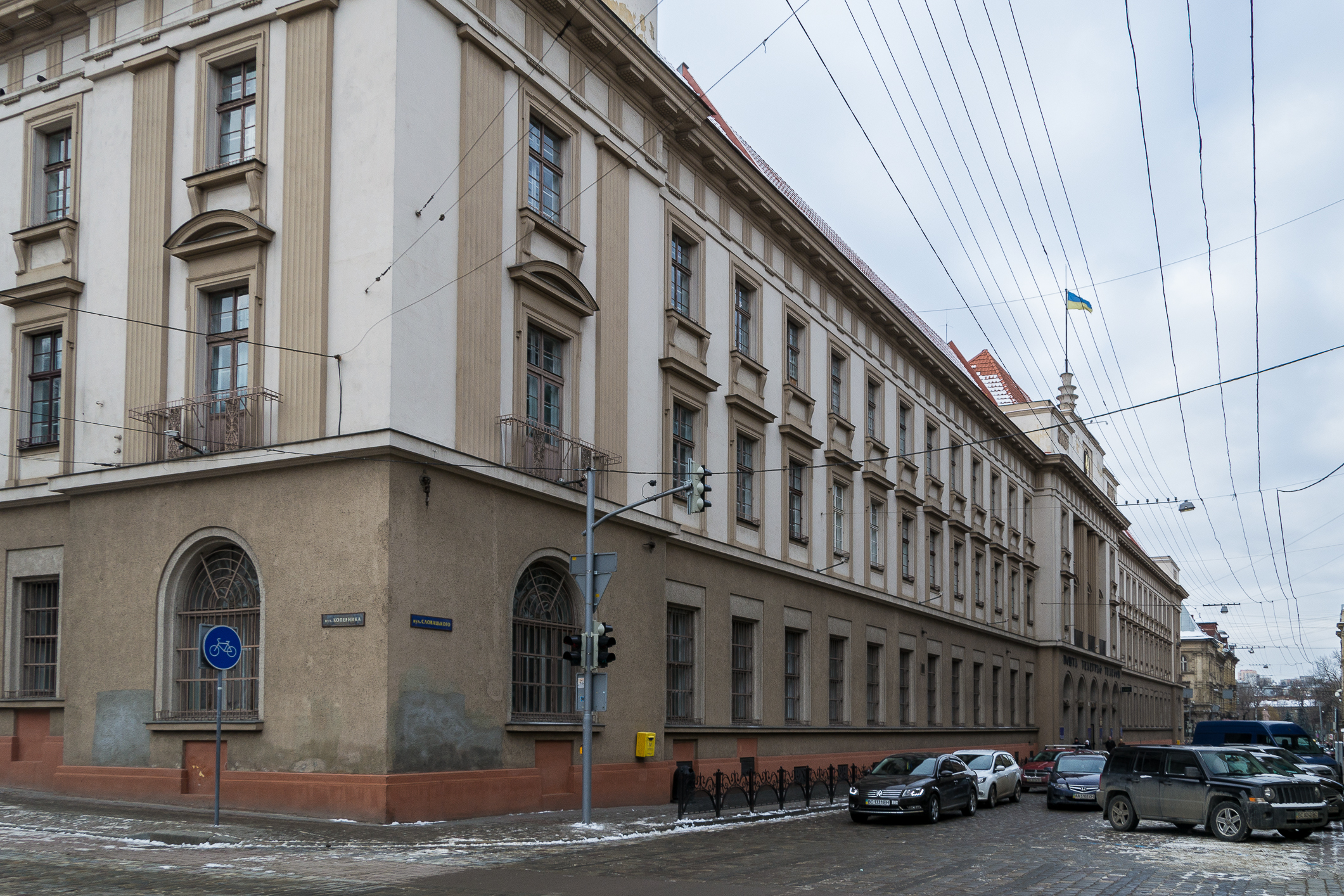
Lviv Main Post Office

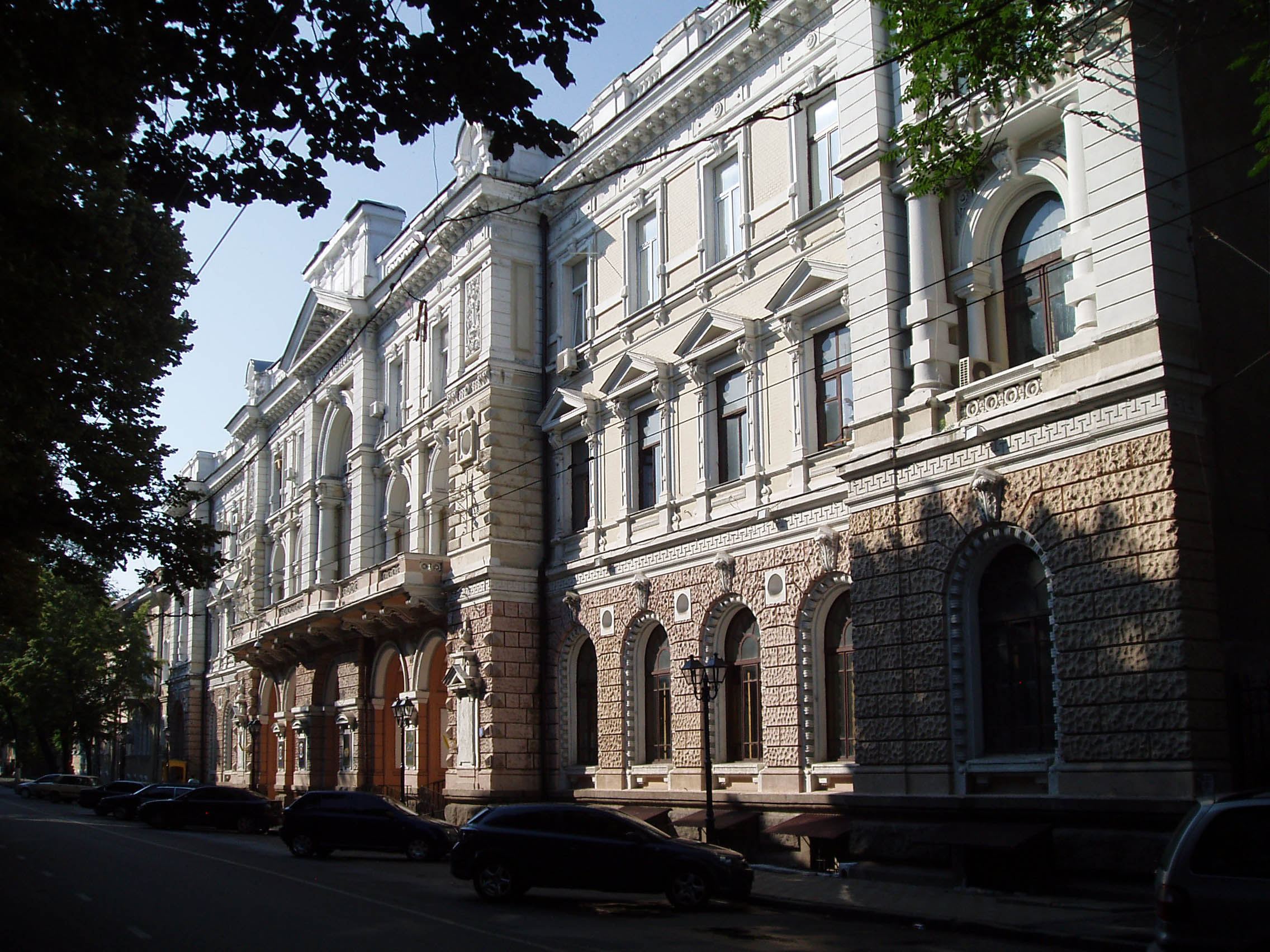
Odesa Main Post Office

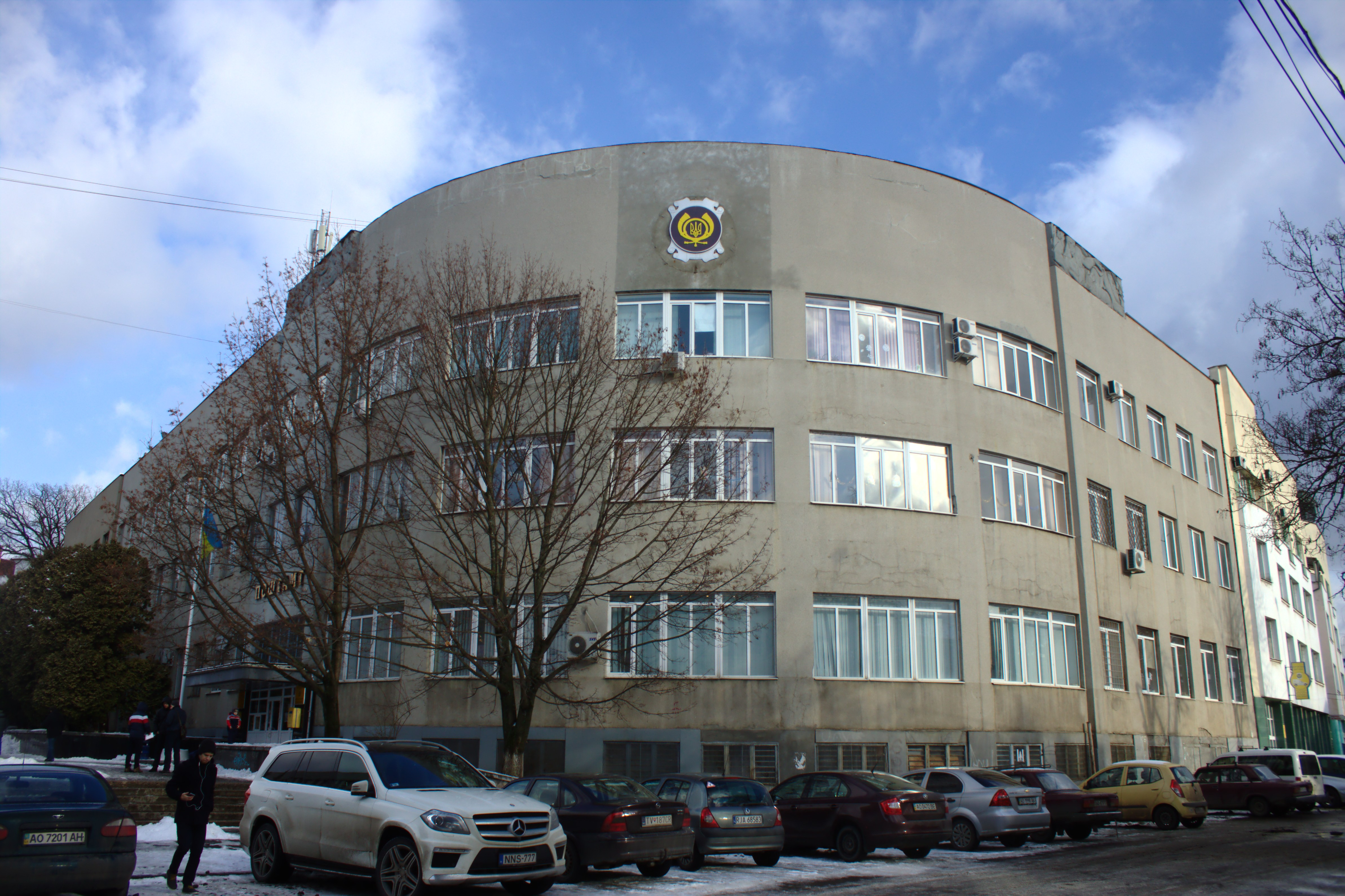
Uzhorod Main Post Office

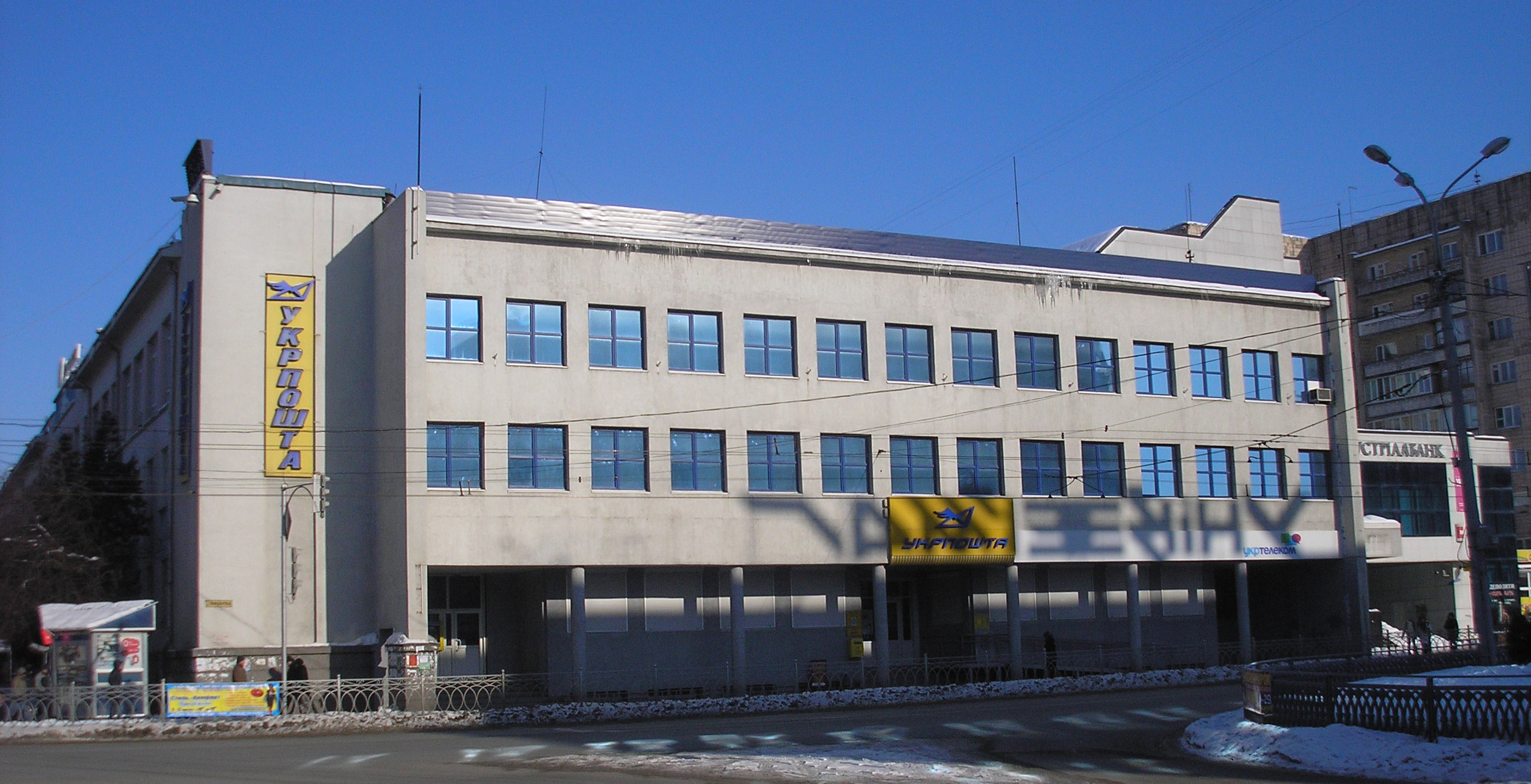
Rivne Main Post Office

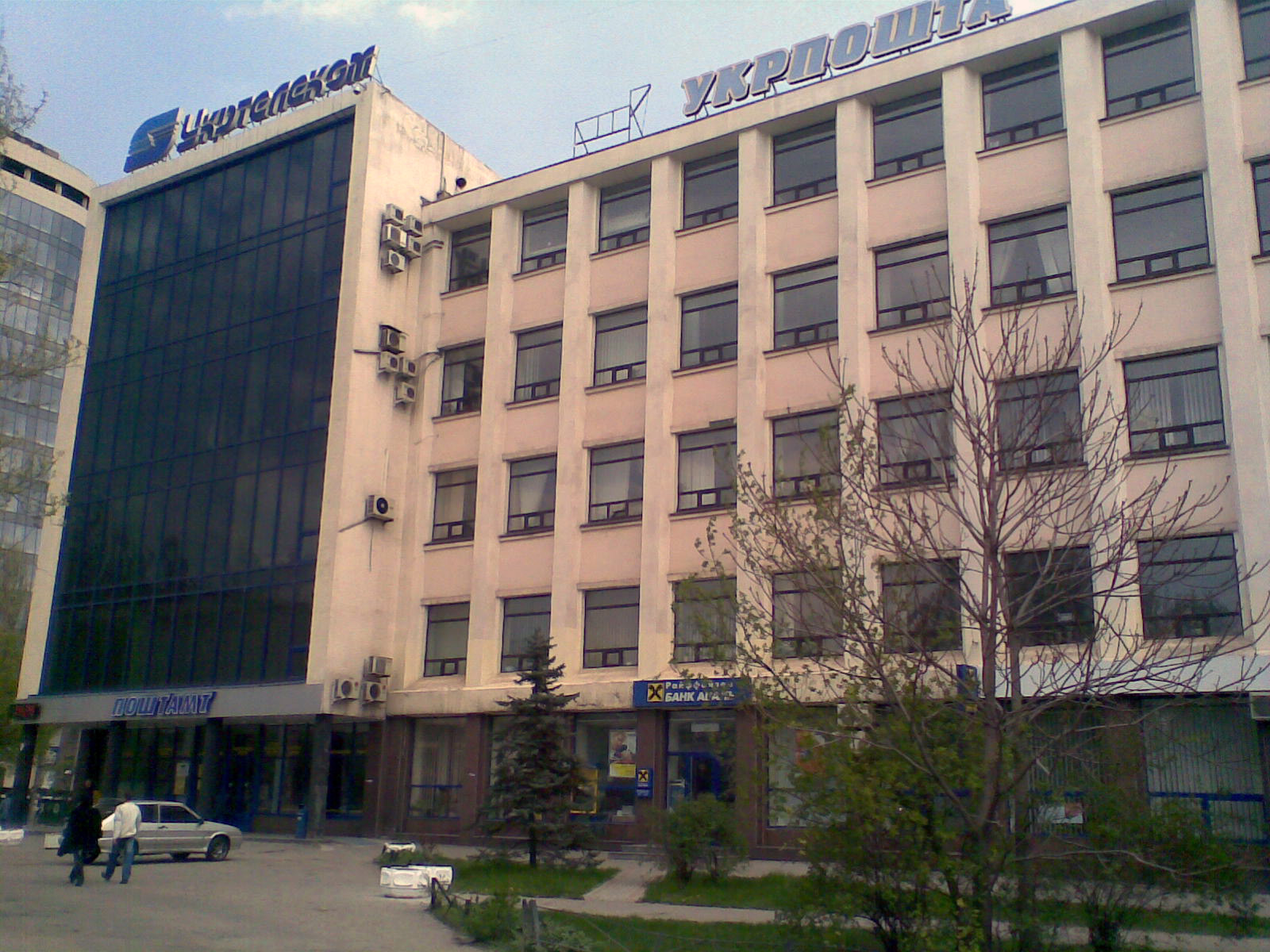
Zaporizhzhia Main Post Office

== See also ==
- Postage stamps and postal history of Ukraine
- Donbass Post - the postal administration of the unrecognized self-declared Donetsk People's Republic
- Post of Crimea - the postal administration that covers the territory of Crimea, which is internationally recognized as part of Ukraine, but it is annexed by Russia in 2014.
- Nova Poshta
