= Central Post Office (Kyiv) =

Headquarters of Ukrposhta

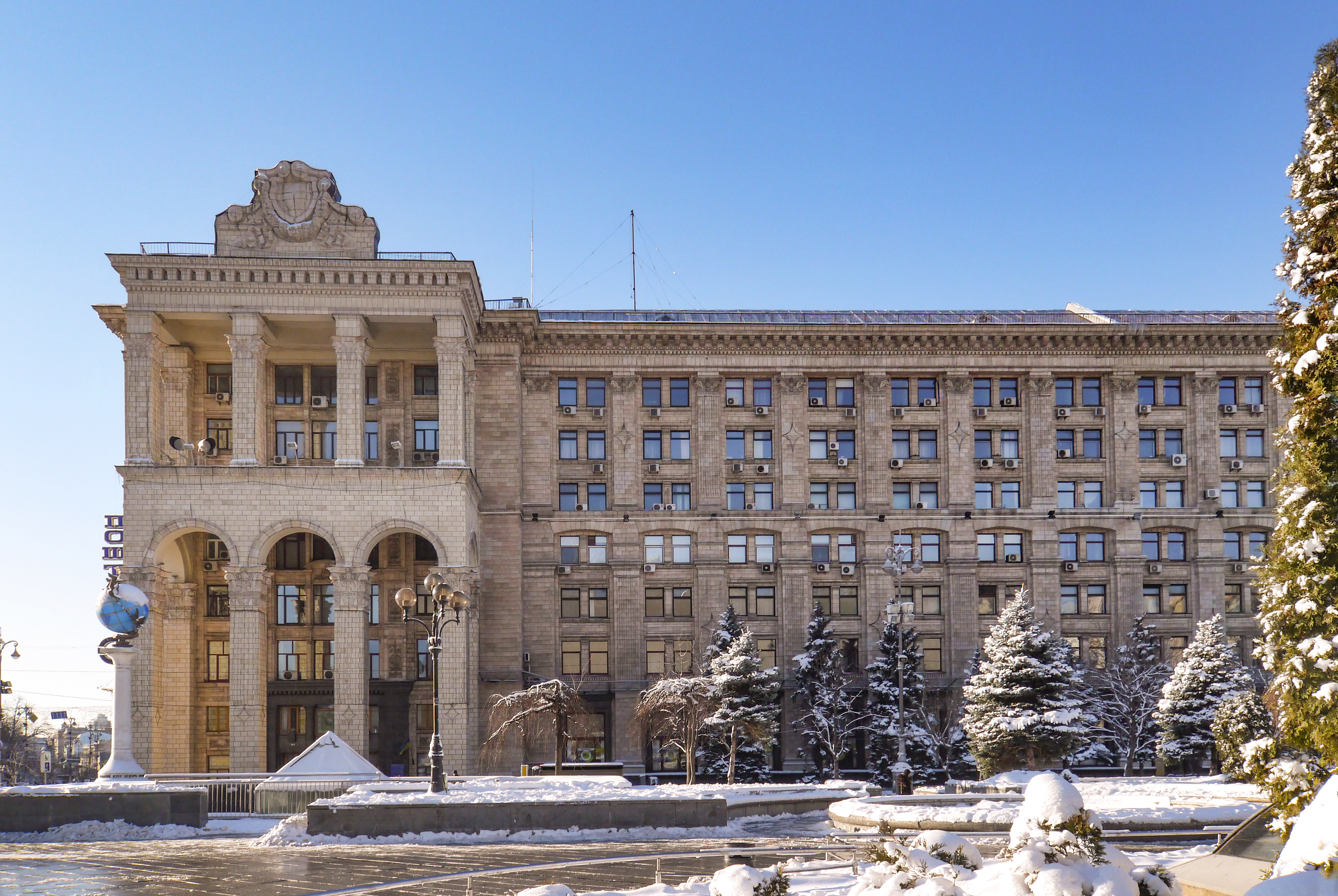
- Interactive map of the Central Post Office area

General information
- Location: Khreshchatyk, 22; Kyiv, Ukraine
- Coordinates: 50.4499°N 30.5232°E
- Current tenants: Ukrposhta
- Completed: 1958 (68 years ago)

Immovable Monument of Local Significance of Ukraine
- Official name: Будинок Головпошти (Building of the Central Post Office)
- Type: Architecture
- Reference no.: 3004-Кв

The Central Post Office (Ukrainian: Головпоштамт, romanized: Holovposhtamt) in Kyiv, Ukraine, is located in Maidan Nezalezhnosti. It houses Ukrposhta, Ukraine's national postal service, and includes offices and a 24-hour internet café on the upper floors. The building was completed in 1958, and underwent a renovation during the 1990s.

== History ==
Construction for a new post office began in 1914, was halted by World War I, and was eventually completed in 1941. It was deliberately destroyed later that year by Soviet forces in an explosion during the 1941 demolition of Kyiv, once Nazi forces had entered the city following the Red Army's retreat. The current building was built between 1952 and 1958.

On 2 August 1989, during heavy rainfall, the portico of the building collapsed, killing 13 people. (Note: United Press International had reported that 11 were killed and 2 others seriously injured.) At the time of the collapse, the building had been undergoing reconstruction.

During the 2022 Russian invasion of Ukraine, although many Ukrposhta employees either moved to safer areas in Western Ukraine or left the country entirely, the post office remained operational. Ukrposhta also released a number of popular stamps, highlighting events such as the sinking of the Moskva, the 2022 Crimean Bridge Bombing, and the liberation of Kherson, leading people to queue up for hours outside the post office.

== Building ==
The seven-story brick building has concrete floors and a tin roof. It is L-shaped, with its wings being about 80 m (260 ft) in length. The wing located along Khreshchatyk has a slight curvature. The façade includes Ukrainian Baroque elements. The building used to have a parapet, but it does no longer. White marble tiles were added to the central hall during a renovation in the 1990s. On the first floor, the frames for the doors and windows are made of dark granite.

== Gallery ==
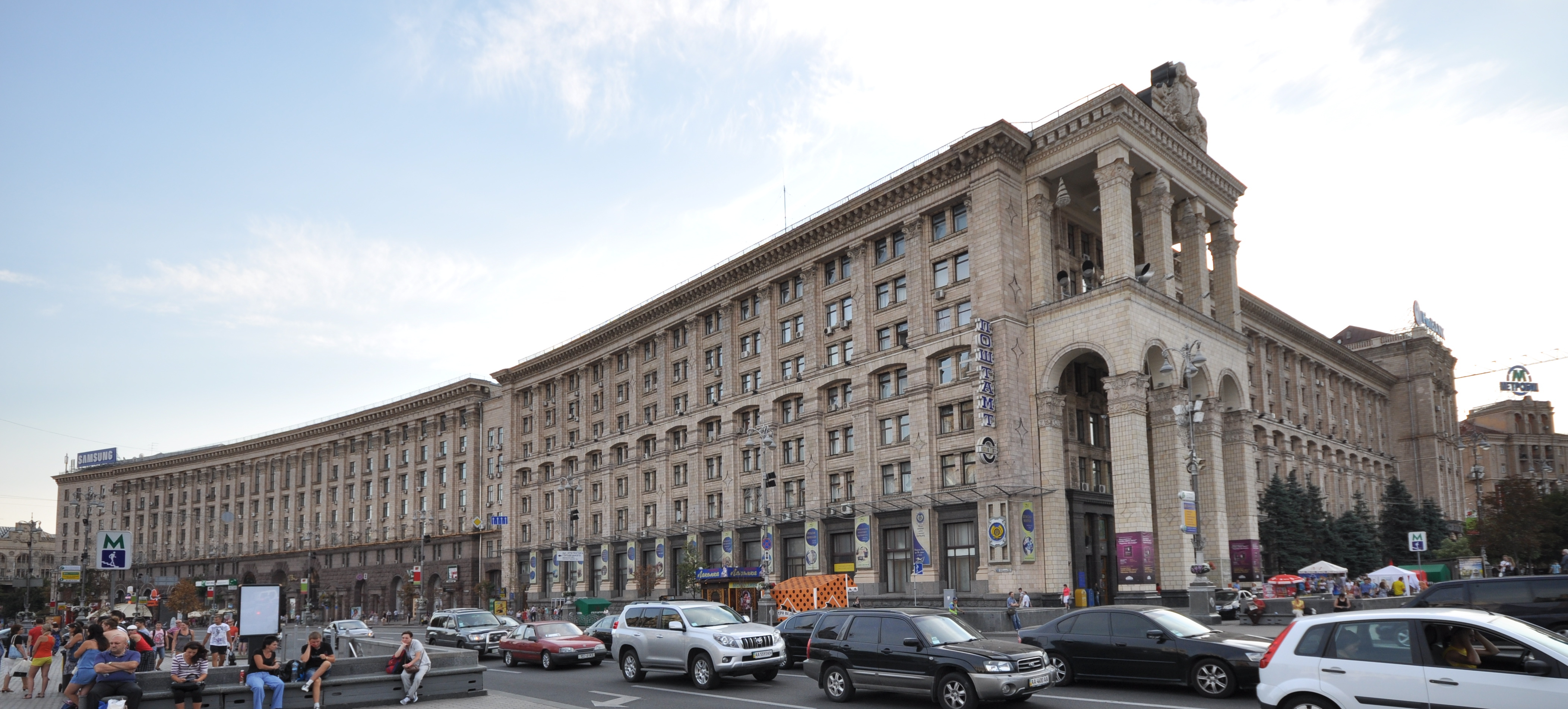
Three-quarter view

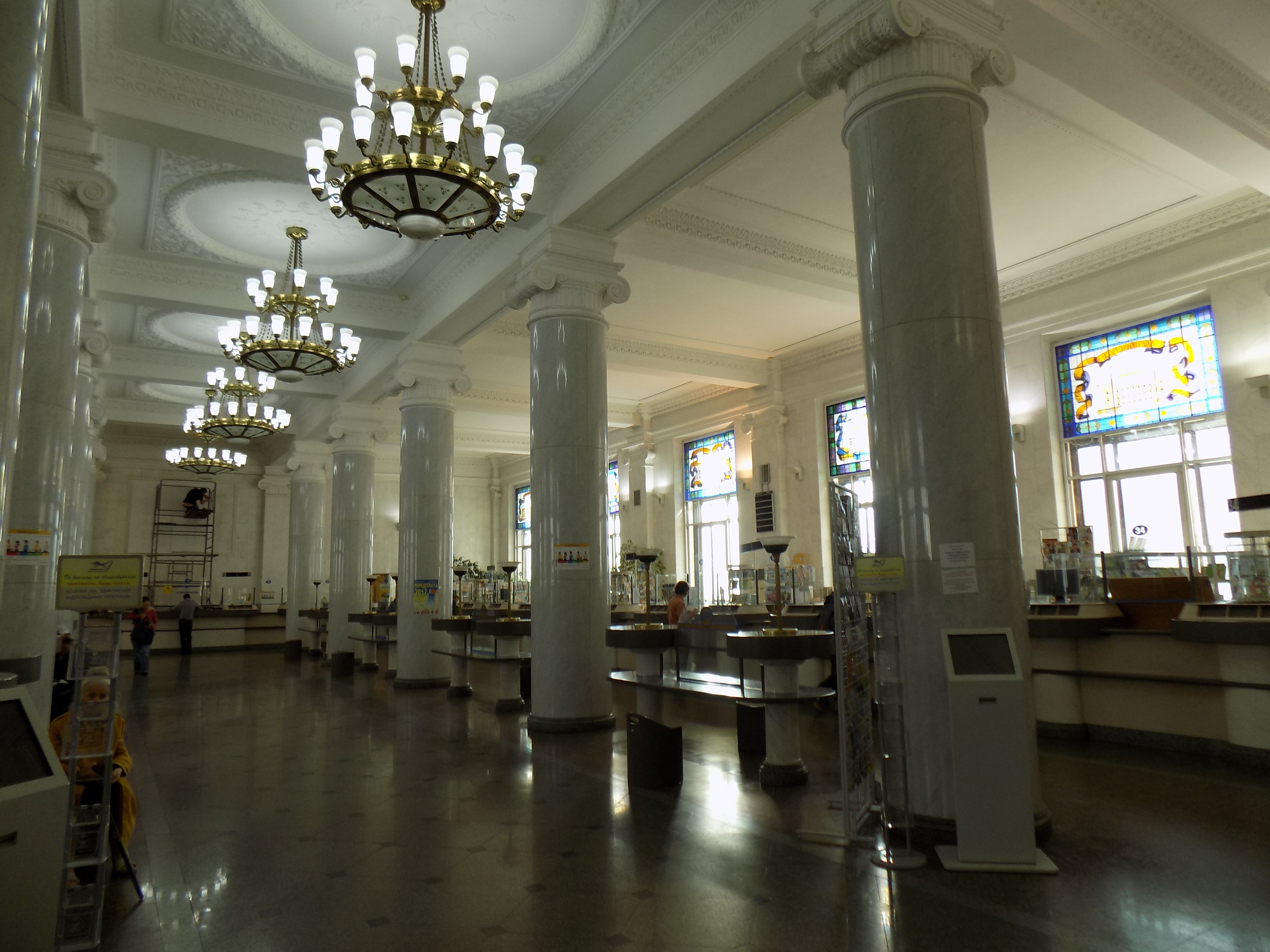
Central hall

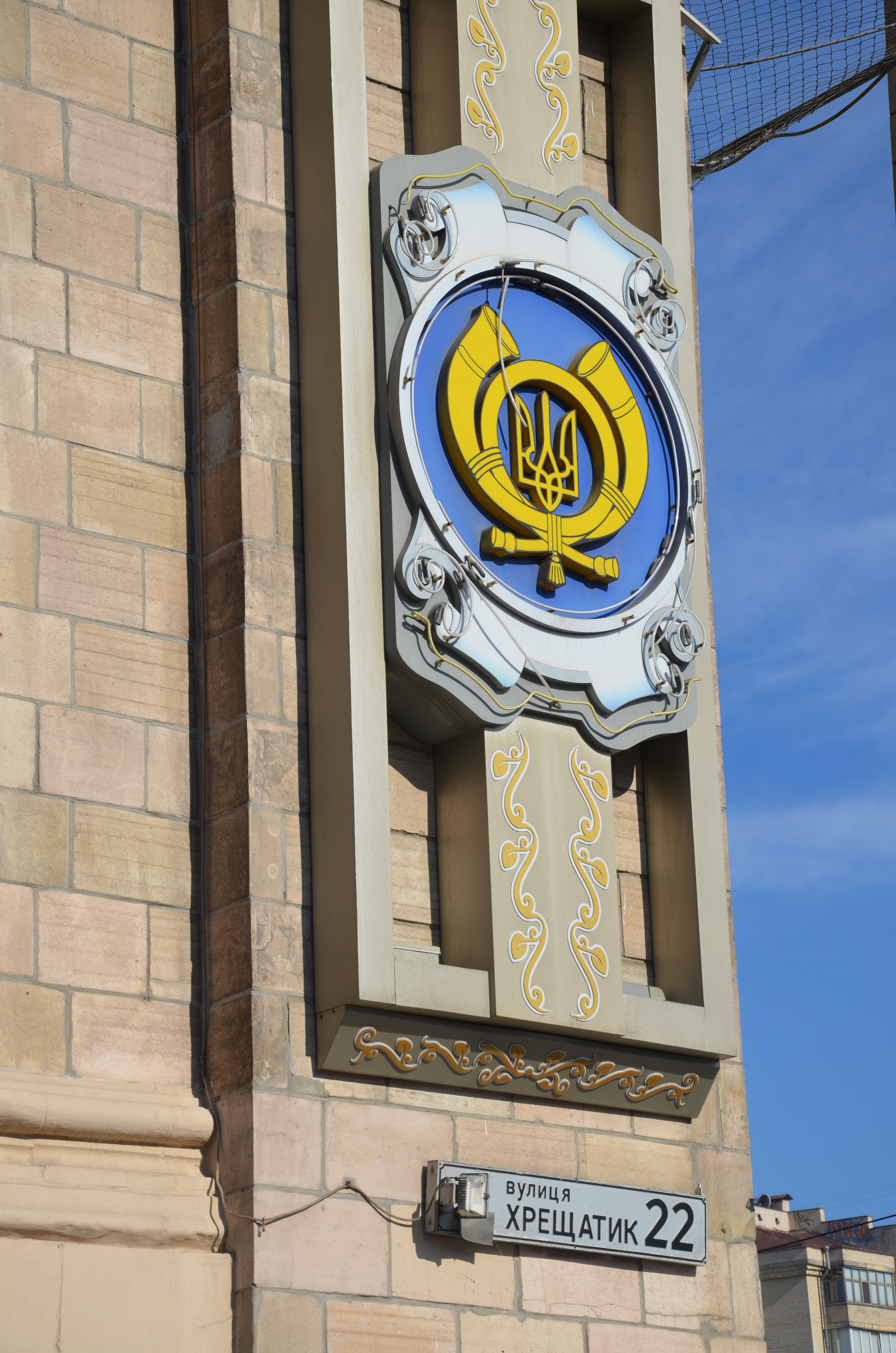
Seal of Ukrposhta

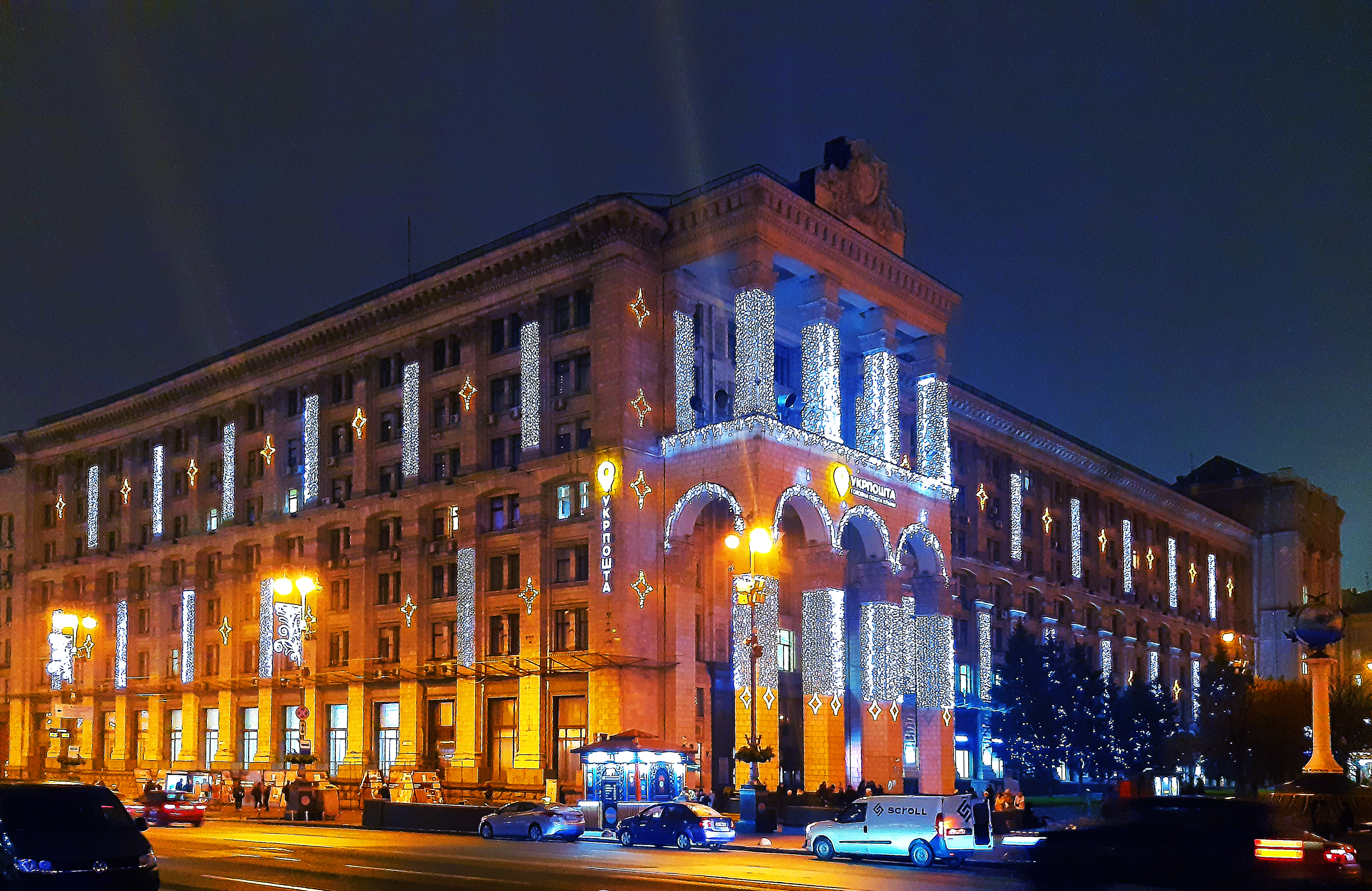
Lit for the holidays

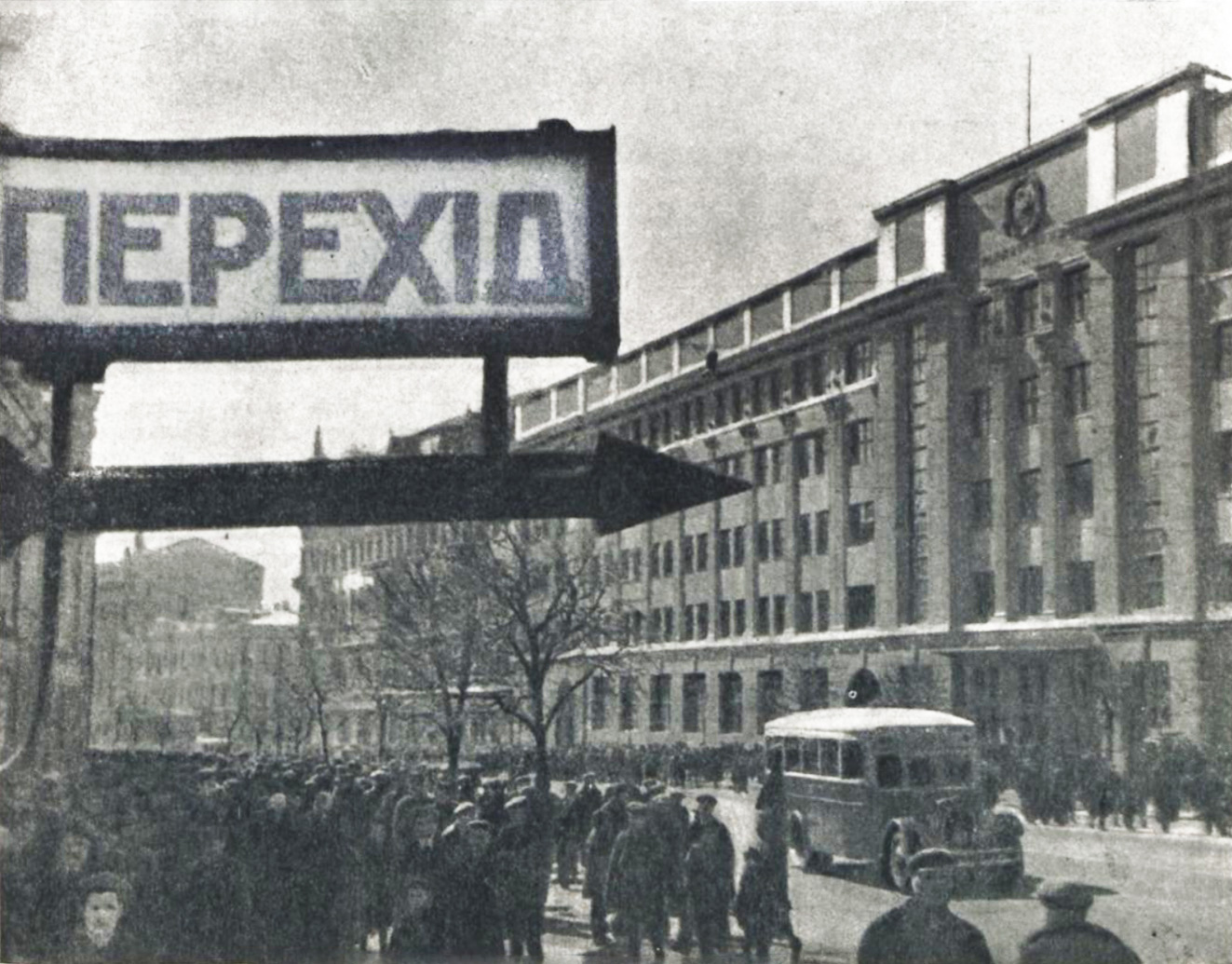
The old post office in 1937 (Note: Although the arrow appears to point to the original post office from the pictured angle, the word on the sign actually means "passage".)

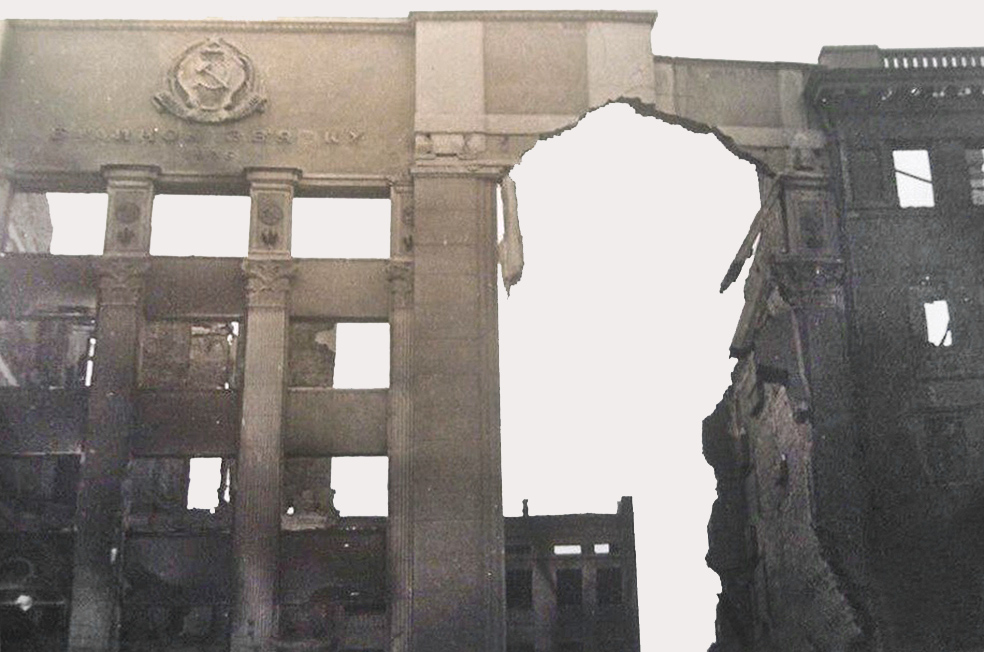
The old building, destroyed in 1941

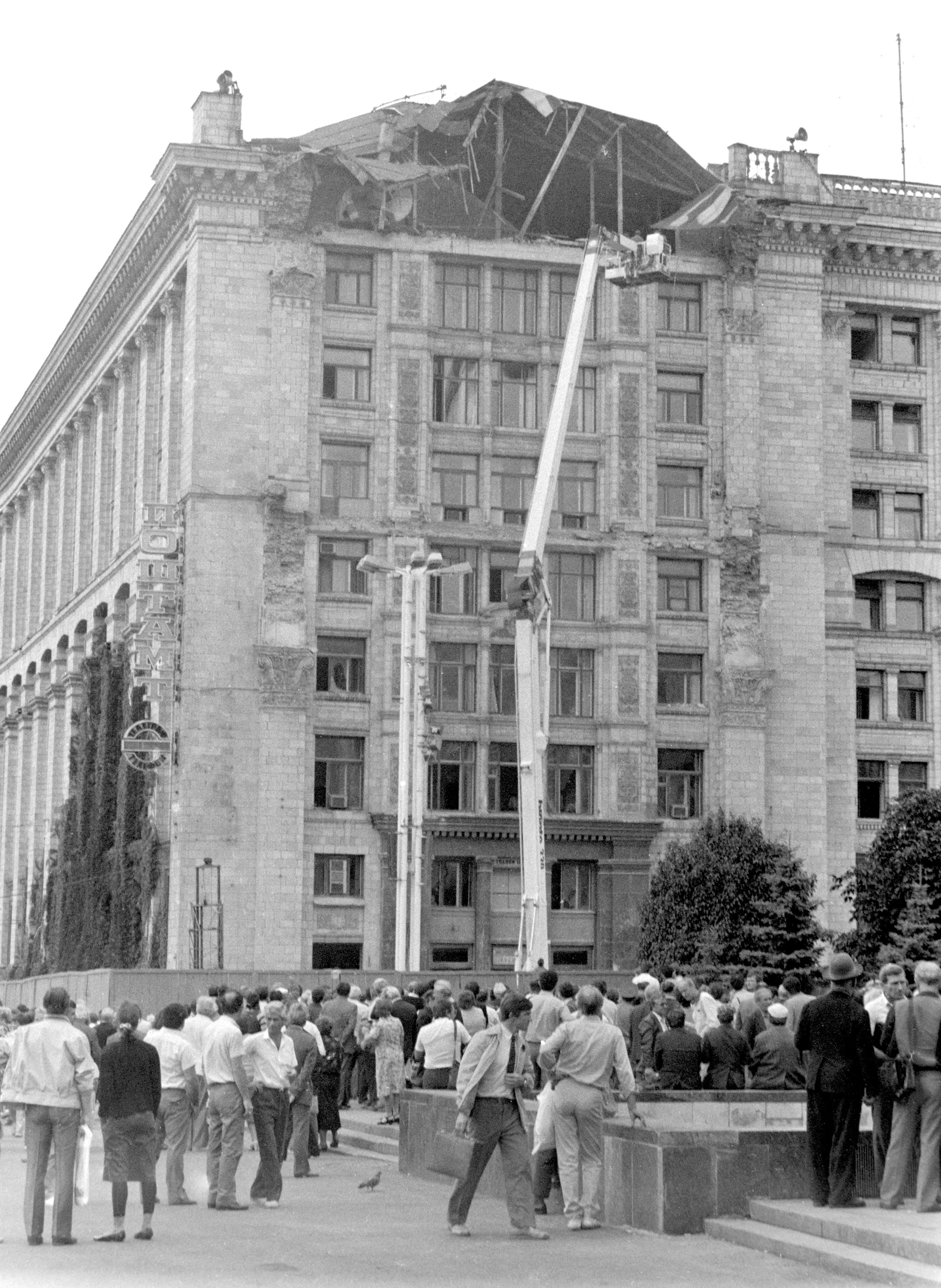
Collapsed portico in 1989

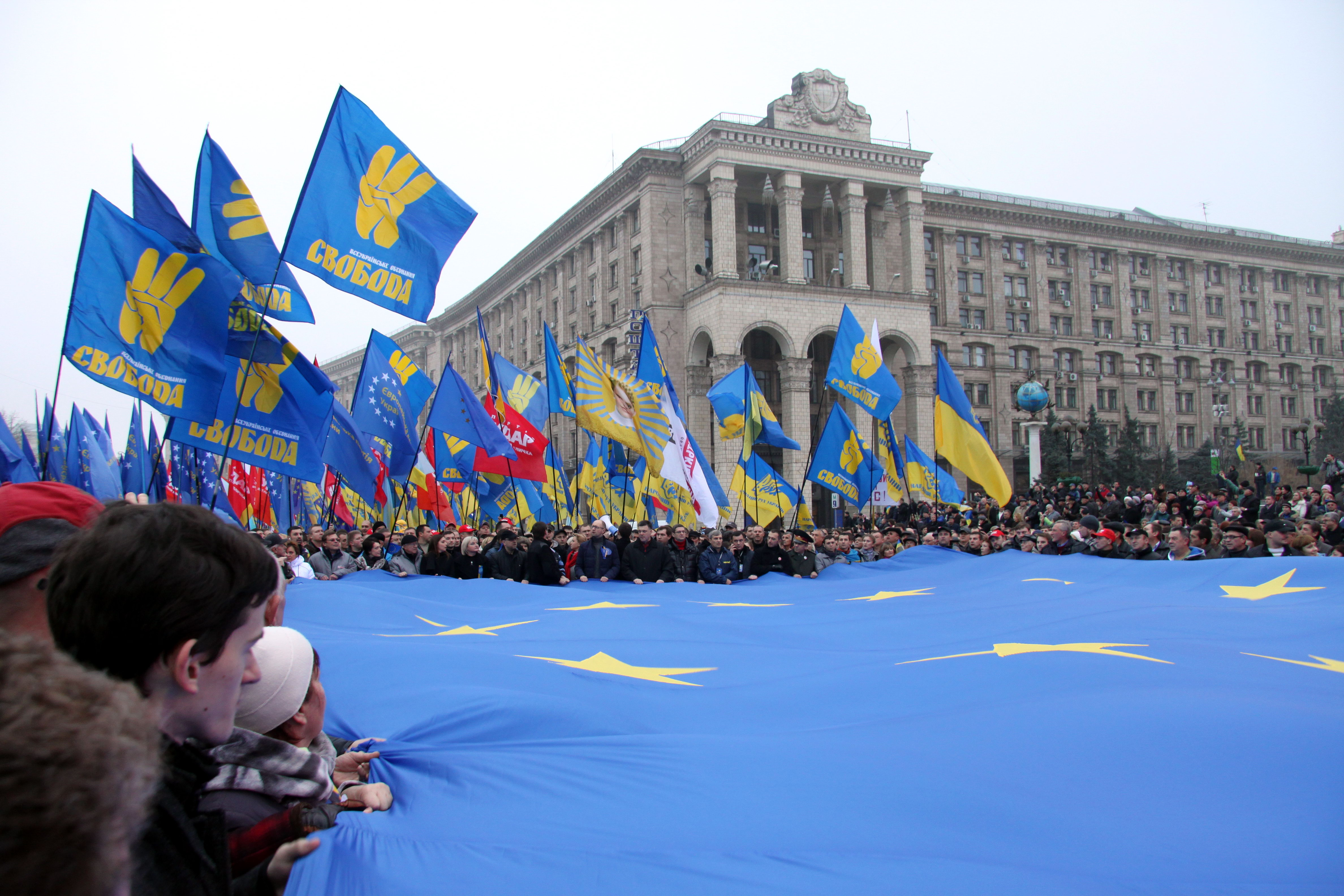
Around the start of Euromaidan

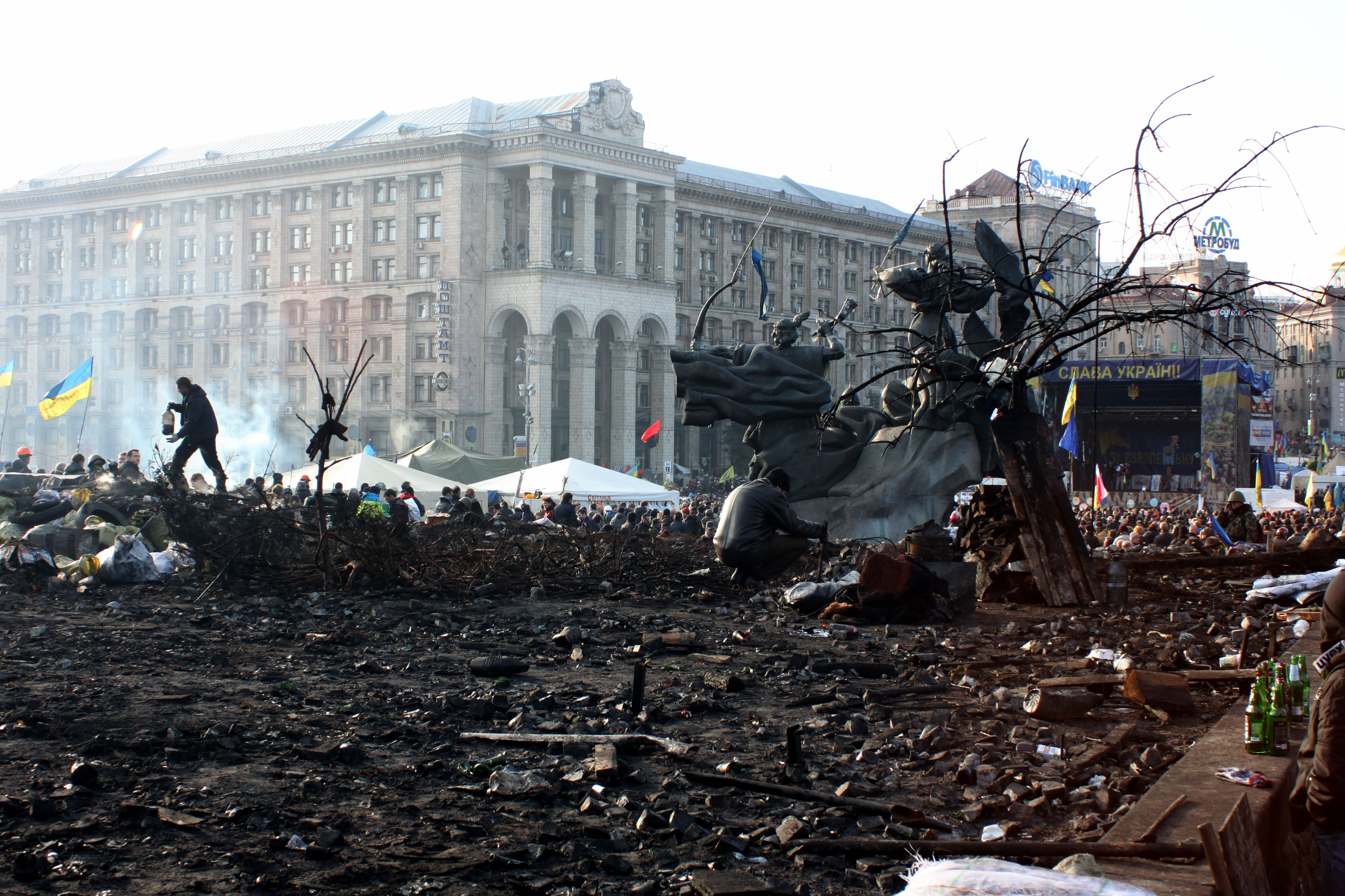
Around the end of Euromaidan
