= Public joint-stock company (Russia) =

Russian type of joint-stock company

Public joint-stock company (Russian: Публичное акционерное общество; abbreviated PAO) is a form of organization of a joint-stock company in Russia which its shareholders have the right to alienate their shares without the need to coordinate with other shareholders.

The organization and activities of Public joint-stock companies are regulated by the federal law of the Russian Federation. Since an open joint-stock company is considered by the legislator to be public, it is required to disclose information in a broader format compared to a non-public joint-stock company. This rule is intended to increase the publicity and transparency of investment processes.

== History ==
Until September 1, 2014, the Civil Code of the Russian Federation applied the classification into open joint-stock companies and Close joint-stock companies, however, with the change in legislation, in Russia the classification into public and non-public joint-stock companies is applied.

== Overview ==
The Public joint-stock company is characterized by the following features:

- Unlimited number of shareholders
- Free circulation of shares on stock exchanges
- No need to contribute funds to the authorized capital of the enterprise before its registration and opening of a savings account

The supreme governing body of a public joint-stock company is the general meeting of shareholders. The exclusive competence of the general meeting is established by law. The general meeting of shareholders has no right to consider and make decisions on issues that are not assigned to its competence by law. The number of shareholders of the company is not limited, shares can be freely traded on the market.

The management of the current activities of the company is carried out by the sole executive body of the company - the director, general director, or the collegial executive body of the company (management board, directorate). The executive bodies are accountable to the board of directors (supervisory board) of the company and the general meeting of shareholders.

The board of directors (supervisory board) of the company and the executive body of the company. The board of directors of a public joint-stock company carries out general management of the company's activities, with the exception of resolving issues assigned to the competence of the general meeting of shareholders.

To exercise control over the financial and economic activities of the company, the general meeting of shareholders elects an audit commission (auditor) of the company. Members of the audit commission (auditor) of the company may not simultaneously be members of the board of directors (supervisory board), or hold other positions in the management bodies of the company. Shares owned by members of the board of directors or persons holding positions in the management bodies may not participate in voting when electing members of the audit commission (auditor) of the company.

The company is obliged to hold an annual general meeting of shareholders. The annual general meeting of shareholders is held within the timeframe established by the charter of the company, but not earlier than two months and not later than six months after the end of the financial year. The annual general meeting of shareholders must resolve such issues as the election of the board of directors, approval of the audit commission (auditor) and auditor, approval of annual reports, annual financial statements, distribution of profits, and issues of dividend payment.

== Rights and obligations of the shareholders ==
Rights of shareholders — owners of ordinary shares:

- To participate in the general meeting of shareholders with the right to vote on all issues within its competence in the manner prescribed by law
- The right to receive dividends
- In the event of liquidation of the company — the right to receive a part of its property
- Each ordinary share of the company provides the shareholder its owner with the same volume of rights

Rights of shareholders — owners of preferred shares:

- The right to receive dividends
- If provided for by the company's charter — the right to receive a part of the company's property in the event of its liquidation
- If provided for by the company's charter the right to demand the conversion of preferred shares into ordinary shares or preferred shares of other types
- The right to participate in the general meeting of shareholders with the right to vote when deciding on issues of reorganization and liquidation of the company

Shareholders have the right to access the company's documents, such as the incorporation agreement, the charter, documents confirming the company's rights to the property on its balance sheet, the company's internal documents, annual reports, and others. Shareholders (shareholder) who hold a total of at least 25 percent of the company's voting shares have the right to access accounting documents and minutes of meetings of the collegial executive body. Shareholders have the right to sell their shares, but other shareholders have a preemptive right to purchase these shares. The charter may provide for a preemptive right for the company itself to purchase shares.

== See also ==
- Unitary enterprise
