= EZAN =

Experimental Factory of Scientific Engineering with Special Design Department (EZAN)
- Company type: Joint stock company of the Russian Academy of Sciences
- Industry: Telecommunication, Chemical analysis, Vacuum systems, Crystal Growth Equipment
- Founded: 1973
- Headquarters: Chernogolovka, Russia
- Key people: Alexey Borodin (general manager); Kuzmin Dinis (chief engineer)
- Products: Multiplexers, high-vacuum systems, automation equipment, data processing equipment, instruments for investigation of structure and chemical analysis of materials, Software
- Services: Telecommunication services
- Net income: US$785866 (2009); US$1.76 million (2006)
- Owner: Russian Academy of Sciences
- Number of employees: 1000
- Website: www.ezan.ac.ru

EZAN (Russian: АО ЭЗАН) is a Russian company that produces a wide range of equipment for science, industry, telecommunications, transport and energy.

== History ==
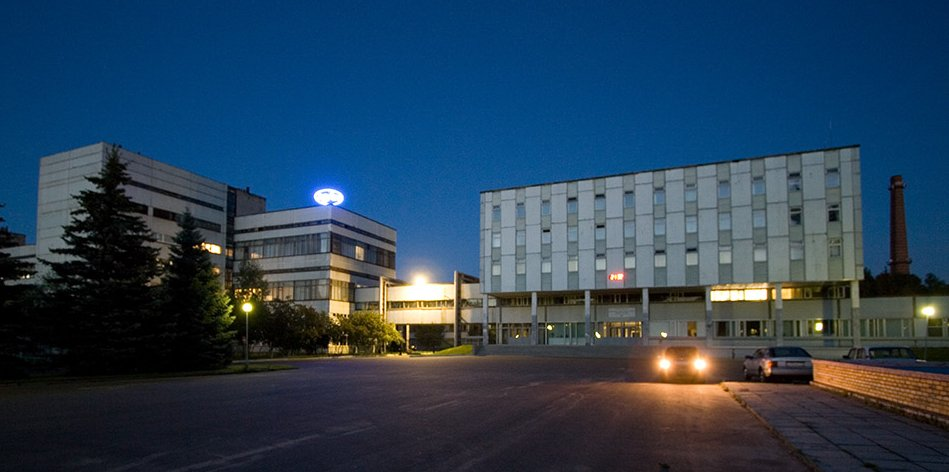
Ezan main building at 2011

Ezan main building at 2002

Construction of the Experimental Factory of Scientific Engineering of the USSR began in 1970 according to the decision of the Council of Ministers. The plant began work in 1973. Initially, acting director of the organizing EFSE played one of the founders of Chernogolovka F. Dubovitsky.

=== Managers ===
1. 1970 - 1972 F. I. Dubovitsky — director-organizer
2. 1972 - 1986 B. S. Kononov — director
3. 1986 - 1991 L. P. Kokurin — director
4. 1991 - 2019 V. A. Borodin — general manager
5. 2019 - nowadays. A. V. Borodin — general manager

=== Economic indicators ===
In year of 2006.

Parameter	Value
Volume of production	US$23 million
Net income	US$1.76 million
Average salary	US$600

== Business structure ==
=== Main engineering units ===
- Special Design Bureau
- Technical department
- Department of digital telecommunications equipment
- Crystal Growth Laboratory
- Central Laboratory
- The central laboratory of instrumentation
- Quality control department
- Service Center

=== The main types of industries and technologies ===
- Toolshop
- Mechanical workshop

- Welding area
- Foundry

- Frame-injection molding workshop

- Area of ceramics and plastics
- Painting area

- Electroplating workshop
- Installation and assembly workshop

== Representative offices ==
=== Moscow representative office ===
Otkrytoe shosse, 14, office 3/8, Moscow, Russia
Chief: Nikolay Kuznetsov
