= State corporation (Russia) =

Non-profit organization owned by Russia

A State Corporation (Russian: Государственная корпорация, romanized: Gosudarstvennaya Korporatsiya) is a non-profit organization, which is wholly owned by the Russian Federation directly, bypassing the Federal Agency for State Property Management. Each State Corporation is created by a legislative act of the Russian Federal Assembly, using Federal funds for its initial operation, to perform social, managerial, and other socially beneficial functions.

This type of legal entity was established in 1999 (Article 7.1, NCO Law). These state corporations are essentially a special type of fully Federally-owned non-profit organizations, and they are different from all the other organizations referred to in the mass media as "state corporations".

A State Corporation is a non-profit organization without stock, wholly funded by the Russian Federation. Property transferred to the corporation becomes its property, and a portion of this property is used to create authorized capital, which determines the minimum asset size of the state corporation.

== Full list of State corporations ==
1. Deposit Insurance Agency of Russia
2. VEB.RF
3. Fund of Housing and Communal Services Development Cooperation
4. Olympstroy
5. Rostec (formerly, Russian Technologies State Corporation - «Rostechnologii»)
6. Rosatom
7. Roscosmos

== Former State corporations ==
- Rusnano (now re-registered as Open joint-stock company)

== See also ==
- State corporation (generically)
- Types of business entity in Russia

== Sources ==
- State Corporation goes for flow
