= Open joint-stock company =

Type of company in former Soviet countries

A public joint-stock company, abbreviated PJSC (Russian: Публичное акционерное общество, abbreviated Russian: ПАО) or open joint-stock company, abbreviated OJSC (Russian: Открытое акционерное общество, abbreviated Russian: ОАО), is a type of company in many successor states of the Soviet Union, particularly in Russia. Its distinguishing feature is the right of stockholders to trade in stocks without the permission of other stockholders. These public stock companies are somewhat comparable to corporations under US law.

== History ==
The concept of an "open joint-stock company" was introduced by the "Regulation on joint-stock companies and limited liability companies", approved by the Resolution of the Council of Ministers of the Soviet Union dated June 19, 1990 No. 590. In the early 1990s, the concept was enshrined in the legislation of a number of independent states that emerged after the collapse of the USSR.

At the beginning of the 21st century, in Kazakhstan, Ukraine and Russia, the concept of an "open joint-stock company" was abolished due to changes in legislation. Thus, the Law of the Republic of Kazakhstan "On Joint-Stock Companies" dated May 13, 2003 abolished the division into open and closed joint-stock companies. Article 5 of the Law of Ukraine "On Joint Stock Companies" of September 17, 2008, instead of open and closed joint stock companies, introduced the concepts of "public joint stock company" (Ukrainian: публічне акціонерне товариство) and "private joint stock company" (Ukrainian: приватне акціонерне товариство); within two years after the law came into force (until April 30, 2011), open joint stock companies had to re-register. From September 1, 2014, OJSC and CJSC were abolished in Russia in connection with the entry into force of amendments to the Civil Code of the Russian Federation; instead of them, Public Joint-Stock Companies (PJSC), Joint stock companies (AO) and Limited liability companies (LLC) could exist.

As of 2019, the existence of open joint-stock companies as a type of public company is provided for in the current versions of the Civil Code of the Belarus, the Civil Code of the Kyrgyz Republic, and the Civil Code of the Republic of Tajikistan.

== See also ==
- Types of business entity in Russia
- Government-owned corporation#Belarus
- Unitary enterprise
