= Unitary enterprise =

Type of business entity

A unitary enterprise (Russian: унитарное предприятие) is a type of government-owned corporation in Russia and some other post-Soviet states. Unitary enterprises are business entities that have no ownership rights to the assets that they use in their operations. This form is possible only for state and municipal enterprises, which respectively operate state or municipal property. The owners of the property of a unitary enterprise have no responsibility for its operation and vice versa.

== Russia ==
=== History ===
During the Soviet period, state property was assigned to state-owned enterprises under the right of operational management, a doctrine developed in the 1940s by Academician A. Benediktov. This right encompassed the powers of enterprises to own, use, and dispose of state property in accordance with the law, planned targets, and the designated purpose of the property.

In its modern form, unitary enterprise as a legal form was first introduced in 1994 with the adoption of part one of the Civil Code of Russia. Federal Law No. 161-ФЗ "On State and Municipal Unitary Enterprises" (amended July 13, 2015), defines the legal status of unitary enterprises in Russia. The State Duma passed this law on October 11, 2002, and President Putin signed it on November 14, 2002.

During 2000–2001, as part of the implementation of measures envisaged by the Concept of State Property Management and Privatization, the number of federal state unitary enterprises in the transport sector, mainly associated with the creation of Russian Railways, was significantly reduced. In 2001, 41 unitary enterprises were identified under the auspices of the State Construction Committee, and 28 under the auspices of the Ministry of Industry and Science.

Decree of the President of Russia "On the Main Directions of State Policy for the Development of Competition" instructed the Government of Russia to develop a federal law restricting the creation of unitary enterprises in competitive markets which resulted in the adoption in 2019 of a federal law amending the Law "on State Enterprises" and the Law "on the Protection of Competition". As a result of the legislation, the creation and operation of unitary enterprises is permitted only in areas where there is no competition such as in activities of government bodies, natural monopolies and so on.

Between 2018 and 2020, the number of unitary enterprises decreased by 31.8%.

=== Overview ===
The assets of unitary enterprises belong to the federal government, to a Russian federal subject, or to a municipality. A unitary enterprise holds assets under economic management (for both state and municipal unitary enterprises) or under operative management (for state unitary enterprises only), but has limited property rights over the assets. The term "unitary" specifies the assets as indivisible, i.e., they may not be distributed among the participants in any way. Property granted to a unitary enterprise can be sold or otherwise alienated only with the consent of the state or municipal property owner.

The existence of unitary enterprises is a legacy of the Soviet era, when the state owned the means of production. The managers of state enterprises often have close ties to the state agencies which established them, a situation that can lead to legal and political problems.

According to the Civil Code of Russia, the constituent document of a unitary enterprise is its charter, approved by the authorized body. Article 9 of Federal Law No. 161-FZ defines the mandatory content of a unitary enterprise charter. The model charter of a federal state unitary enterprise was approved by Order No. 205 of the Ministry of Economic Development of Russia dated August 25, 2005. The governing body of a unitary enterprise is the manager appointed by the owner.

Though government entities own the unitary enterprises, the enterprises themselves work on the basis of commercial accounts and of commercial legislation. They come under ministerial responsibility but are off-budget. A unitary enterprise is independent in economic issues and obliged only to give its profits to the state. Unitary enterprises have no right to set up subsidiaries, but they can, with the owner's consent, open branches and representation offices. They may be auxiliary to a ministry's activity, such as a printing house under the Ministry of Education or a production facility for police equipment under the Ministry of Internal Affairs. Unitary enterprises have a distinct legal status, different from other public companies.

A significant portion of unitary enterprise transactions are subject to approval by the property owner and the federal executive body to which the enterprise is subordinate. Specifically, such approval is required for any major transaction, which, within the meaning of the law, is defined as a transaction or several interrelated transactions related to the acquisition, disposal, or potential disposal by a unitary enterprise, directly or indirectly, of property whose value exceeds 10% of the unitary enterprise's authorized capital or exceeds 50,000 times the minimum wage.

Furthermore, for a number of transactions concluded by a unitary enterprise following its auctions, approval is conducted in two stages, which typically include preliminary approval of the transaction and subsequent oversight. Decisions regarding certain transactions involving the property of unitary enterprises must be made by federal executive bodies solely on the basis of a decision of the Government of the Russian Federation in the form of a resolution signed by the Prime Minister of Russia. In certain cases, an approval from the Federal Agency for State Property Management is also required.

A unitary enterprise also has no right to provide loans, guarantees, receive bank guarantees, or enter into transactions involving other encumbrances, assignments of claims, or debt transfers without the consent of the property owner. Furthermore, when disposing of a unitary enterprise's real estate, an appraisal is mandatory which, in the case of a large number of appraisal objects requires significant material costs and dramatically reduces the enterprise's economic benefit from disposing of such property, in particular, leasing property not used for its core business.

A unitary enterprise has the right to dispose of both movable and immovable property only to the extent that it does not deprive it of the ability to carry out the activities, purposes, and objects defined by the charter. Transactions concluded by the enterprise in violation of this requirement are void, which effectively allows such transactions to be declared invalid by a court within 10 years of their conclusion, upon suit by any interested party. Profit distribution is also dependent on the decision of the federal, regional or local executive body overseeing the unitary enterprise. It is the executive body that decides whether to transfer to the federal budget a portion of the profit (at least 25%) remaining after taxes and other mandatory payments.

A unitary enterprise lacks the ability to attract long-term investment, since all its assets are owned by the Russian Federation, which has the right to either decrease or increase the company's authorized capital. This poses risks to potential creditors of non-repayment of funds or assets provided.

Enterprises founded on the right of economic management enjoy greater freedom of action than another government-owned corporation called State enterprise (Russian: казенные предприятия) and in most cases, are independently responsible for their own performance.

Some of the largest federal state unitary enterprises include Russian Post, Air Traffic Management Corporation and All-Russia State Television and Radio Broadcasting Company, while large non-federal unitary enterprises include Moscow Metro, Mosgortrans and Saint Petersburg Metro.

== See also ==
- Public joint-stock company (Russia)
- State corporation (Russia)
