= Sergey Kurginyan =

Russian scientist (born 1949)

- Сергей Кургинян
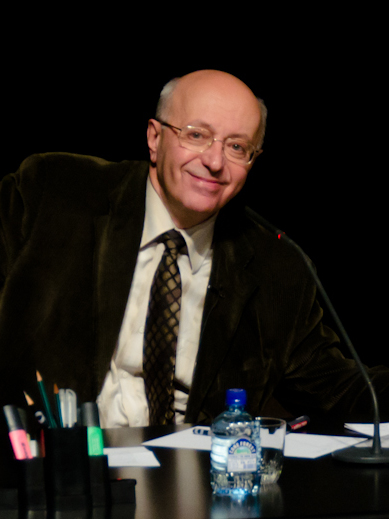
- Casual portrait, 2011
- Born: 14 November 1949 (age 77); Moscow, Russian SFSR, Soviet Union
- Education: Moscow Institute of Geological Exploration, Shchukin's Theatre School
- Known for: political scientist founder and leader of a Russian movement Essence of Time
- Scientific career
- Fields: Physics, mathematics
- Workplaces: Experimental Creative Center
- Sergey Kurginyan's voice Recorded 5 July 2007
- Website: www.kurginyan.ru

Sergey Yervandovich Kurginyan (Russian: Сергей Ервандович Кургинян; born 14 November 1949) is a Russian politician, scientist, and theatre producer. He is the founder and leader of the Russian neo-Soviet movement Essence of Time.

== Biography ==
He was born in Moscow; his father, Yervand Amayakovich Kurginyan (1914–1996), of Armenian origin, was a professor of modern history and a specialist on the Middle East. His mother, Mariya Sergeyevna Kurginyan (Bekman) (1922–1989), was a senior research fellow at the Gorky Institute of World Literature, an expert on Thomas Mann and the author of several monographs. His maternal grandfather was a White officer who went over to the Red side in the Civil War; he was executed on 2 November 1938.

Kurginyan graduated from the Moscow Institute of Geological Exploration with the specialty of geophysics (1972). He finished at Shchukin's Theatre School (1983), specializing in "directing the drama." He gained his Ph.D. in Mathematical Sciences, Fellow Institute of Oceanology, USSR Academy of Sciences (1974–1980). Up to 1986, he was a senior research fellow at the Laboratory of Applied Cybernetics, Moscow Institute of Geological Exploration.

== Soviet period ==
Kurginyan was a member of the commission on new theatrical forms of the Theatre Union of the RSFSR and the initiator of the socio-economic experiment "Studio Theatre at the collective work contract." In 1967, while a student, Kurginyan created his own Theatre Studio which in 1986, together with the studios of M. Rozovsky, "the South-West", "Man" and others took part in the experiment "Theatre in the collective work contract." According to the results of the experiment Kurginyan's theatre "On the boards" got the status of a state theatre. The theatre of Sergey Kurginyan confesses Philosophy and metaphysical approach to the phenomena of our time.

From the 1980s, Kurginyan in parallel to his theatre activities was engaged in the analysis of the political process. In early 1987, he founded a theater club On the Boards (Na doskakh) which was sponsored by the Moscow City Council and was under the personal patronage of Yurii Prokof'ev, the Moscow gorkom first secretary; this allowed Kurginyan contact with powerful commmunist party members and state leaders. In November 1987, the executive committee of the Moscow City Council by the decision N 2622 created the "Experimental Creative Center" which was based on the theatre-studio "On the boards" and gave him the set of premises on the Vspolny Lane in Moscow. In 1988, Kurginyan became an official member of the communist party, and in January 1989, he became the boss of the organization of a new type - "Experimental Creative Center", which was established by the Moscow City Authority on the base of his theater. He repeatedly went to the "hot spots" on behalf of the Central Committee (then - leadership of the Supreme Soviet of the RSFSR) for independent examination.

The Moscow-based Experimental Creative Center came to employ several thousand specialists, and became a state-sponsored think tank tasked with coming up with a plan to restore order in the Soviet economy and society. After unsuccessful attempts to offer his services to the Secretary Central Committee Alexander Yakovlev (1987), chairman of the Presidium of the Supreme RSFSR Vitaly Vorotnikov and the chairman of the KGB Victor Cherbrikov (1988) Kurginyan was close to the second (later the first) Secretary of the CPSU MGK Yuri Prokofiev and was introduced into groups of the Council of Ministers of the USSR and the Central Committee. In September 1990, at the brainstorm in the Council of Ministers Kurginyan proposed rigid confiscatory measures and mass repressions against "speculators informal economy", calling the remark Deputy Prime Minister Leonid Abalkin "we already went through it in 1937". He supported in this period close contact with the "Union".

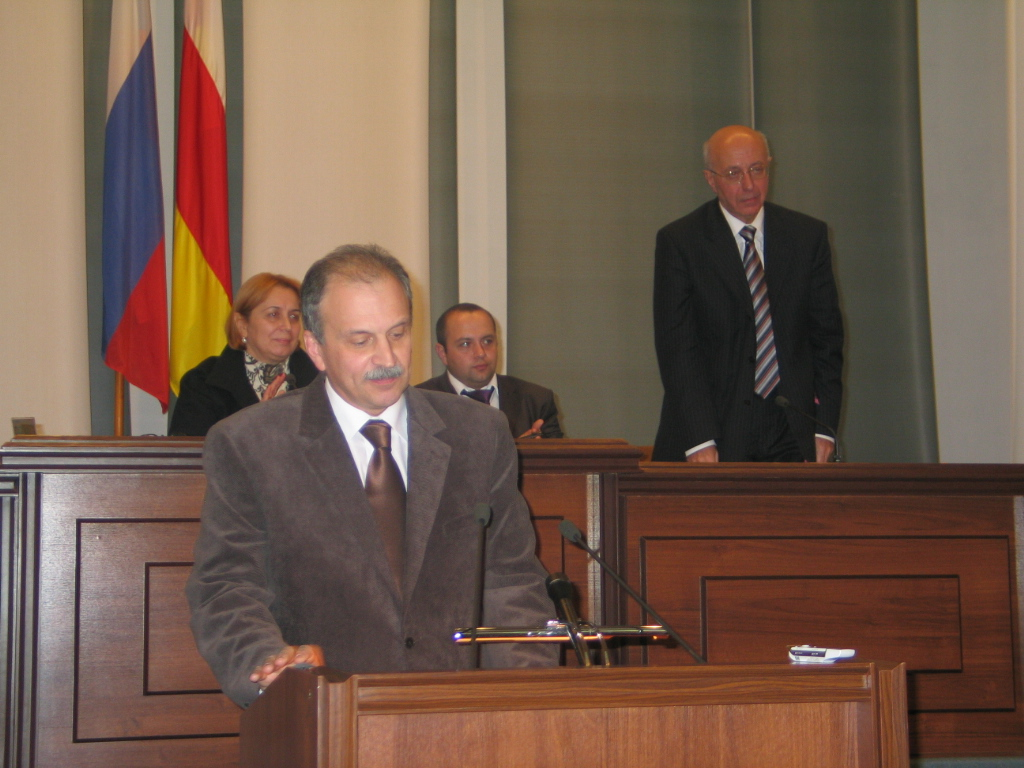
Sergei Kurginyan (in the background) at the forum 'The Caucasus today and tomorrow: an open dialogue of young people.", 2010

Kurginyan and his organization played a major role in the debate within the Soviet leadership regarding the 500 Days Program that was to transition the USSR into a market economy. In August 1990, Kurginyan was commissioned by Ryzhkov to study the plan; in September, Kurginyan was invited to a session of the Council of Ministers. There, Kurginyan strongly denounced the 500 Days Program, stating that its leading authors, the economists Yavlinksii and Shatalin, were "objectively acting as agents of imperialism" and stating that the reformist wing of the communist party constitutes a "criminal mafia" that already possessed a fortune of 900 billion rubles. Kurginyan's opposition to the program gave him power and prestige amongst Soviet hardliners; in October 1990 Ryzhkov granted Kurginyan's Experimental Creative Center international status and various privileges.

The Russians were offered to follow the example of Japan and "sparingly and prudently" put all the released funds to the program of national salvation of Russia. In 1990, Kurginyan created "Experimental Creative Centre" which main task is to unite aesthetics, ethics and epistemology. Since 2004 this community has associated nongovernmental status in the United Nations.

In 1991, Kurginyan refused to become a counselor of Gorbachev because of differences in attitudes towards the withdrawal of the Communist Party and the country out of the impasse. Kurginyan's idea of relying on an intelligent layer (mainly scientific and technical intelligentsia) for guiding the country through the modernization was supported by Yuri Prokofiev, the secretary of the CPSU MGK. A number of houses in the center of Moscow have been granted to S. Kurginyan who united in the Experimental Creative Center a number of organizations and laboratories with the development breakthroughs.

In 1990, Kurginyan also ran for the deputies of the RSFSR (on Chertanovskaya territorial district N 58, Moscow). The election program of the candidate S. Kurginyan proposed the strategy for national salvation of Russia which was developed to prevent the disintegration of the Russian economy, society and state. In response to the question of where to get the money to implement this program, a candidate's campaign materials stated that Russia annually loses huge sums of money due to unequal distribution between the constituent republics of the USSR, the unfinished objects, the Union's "projects of the century" and so on.

In February 1991, the new Soviet prime minister Valentiv Pavlov ordered the Ministry of Defense, Ministry of Internal Affairs, and KGB to assign Kurginyan and his center elite officers. Kurginyan's views influenced Vladimir Kryuchkov, who, under Kurginyan's urging, frequently accused Western capital of carrying out an operation of "economic sabotage" against the USSR. Prime Minister Pavlov was also inspired by Kurginyan to accuse private banks of Canada, Austria, and Switzerland of running a grand scheme of undermining the economic independence of the USSR. In July 1991, Kurginyan's center published a draft proposal for a new CPSU platform in July 1991, and also contributed to the economic program of Nikolay Lysenko's National Republican Party of Russia.

== Post-Soviet period ==
In 1993, Kurginyan became an advisor of Ruslan Khasbulatov. During events of October 1993 he was in the building of the Supreme Council. He was the developer of the script of the behavior of the opposition forces, an alternative to that which was implemented on 3 October ("march to the Ostankino"). According to him, a campaign plan to Ostankino was provocative. Several times he thwarted provocations, organized among the "White House's Citizens" (so-called "Sokolov's rebellion," etc.), strongly objected to the incorporation in "White House's Citizens" the Barkashov's fellows and other provocative elements.

He led political dialogue and the information campaign in favor of the Supreme Council. September 30 the "party" supporters of the march to the Ostankino, existing inside the building, achieved expulsion of S. Kurginyan as a dangerous enemy. The same day, S. Kurginyan addressed to all the supporters of the Supreme Council with a cautionary note of the impending provocation. The warning was passed through the channels that existed at the time: the information system "The Ring". It also appeared on the tapes of official news (full text in "Russia-XXI», № 8, 1993).

Later in the 1990s, Kurginyan created special appendixes in order to popularize the ideas of the Experimental Creative Center, creating the interregional club Postperestroika in 1992, and in 1994, Substantive Unity. Among the members of Substantive Unity were former Constitutional Court chairman Valery Zorkin, former politburo member Oleg Shenin, as well as Kryuchkov and Ryzhkov. Since 1993, the center was also publishing a journal Rossiya XXI (Russia in the Twenty-First Century).

In 1996 he invited the representatives of big business (among them Boris Berezovsky, Mikhail Khodorkovsky, Vladimir Gusinsky, Mikhail Fridman and others) to unite and embark on a constructive public attitude. The result was the famous "Letter from thirteen" which led to the creation of the so-called Semibankirschina — a closed group of oligarchs who owned over 50% of all Russian resources, the majority of Russian mass media, and who promoted Boris Yeltsin during the presidential election of 1996. Between 1996 and 2000 they turned into the main power behind Russian politics and economy, unofficially manipulating Yeltsin and his decisions.

In his own words, he participated in the removal of Gen. Alexander Lebed from the post of Secretary Russian Security Council.

In 2007, before the presidential election in Russia he said that "the principle of presidential power in Russia is a more fundamental constitutional than the principle, which refers to the two-term presidency," and expressed concern that "if Putin tries to move from the presidency at a millimeter, it will collapse the system."

From July to December 2010 he was a co-host of TV program "The court of time."

In 2011, after the United Russia Party Congress, in comments on the nomination of Putin as a candidate for President of Russia, Kurginyan said that "a process that they would like to turn towards a return to radical liberalism, in this side it did not turn". He added that "the de-Stalinization of radical liberalism, the return to the dead mythology and types of social and cultural life, - this all is over in the near future." Addressing his supporters, Kurginyan also stressed that this did not happen due to "between others thanks to our modest efforts."

He is the author and the host of the "anti show" program "The essence of time", published since February 2, 2011 on the video-hosting service Vimeo, the site of the Experimental Creative Center and the site of the virtual club "The essence of time". The program, among other things, says the idea of the messianic role of Russia in the modern world.

Since August 2011 he is co-host (along with Nicholas Svanidze) of the project "The historical process" on TV "Russia."

Kurginyan wrote many political books such as "Field of the response action", "Russian question", "Post-restructuring", "Seventh Scenario","Weakness of power", "Swing", "Esau and Jacob", "Theory and practice of political games", "Radical Islam", "Political Tsunami".

In July 2014, during the War in Donbas, Kurginyan accused Igor Girkin (Strelkov) of surrendering Sloviansk and not keeping his oath to die in Sloviansk. Kurginyan believed that surrendering Sloviansk was a war crime, and Strelkov should be responsible for that. Donbas separatist Pavel Gubarev whacked Kurginyan in the face, and the prime minister of the Donetsk People's Republic, Alexander Borodai, promised to shoot Kurginyan to death. According to Aleksandr Dugin, Kurginyan is a traitor and is working for oligarchs, Yukos and Israel.

In the words of journalist Alexander Nevzorov, if we had had Kurginyan and Dugin instead of Putin, "there would have been hell for all of us to pay, they would have unleashed a European and World War without a shadow of a doubt, without considering consequences at all". But "Dugin and Kurginyan do not have the slightest impact on what is going on in the Kremlin and do not even get coaching there".

== Views ==
Kurginyan has been described as a national communist, neo-Stalinist, and a Soviet nostalgic. In 1990 and 1991, Kurginyan's views played an influential role as a theoretical basis for the conservative members of the Communist Party of the Soviet Union and Soviet nationalists who sought to preserve the Soviet political system and the economy; he postulated an economic reform based on concentrating resources within a small sector of party-controlled, privileged, empowered firms. This was to enable the USSR to achieve technological progress while maintaining a command economy. Kurginyan blamed the Western security services for the Soviet financial problems, and criticized Russian democrats for believing that the West would save the Russian economy. Kurginyan describes his own ideology as "White Communism", which combined "extreme nationalism and communist revivalism" and synthesized communism with Eurasian collectivism; it represented both nationalist and neo-communist opposition to Gorbachev and Yeltsin.

Kurginyan envisioned a Soviet Union as a politically authoritarian, economically modern and culturally traditionalist state which an economy composed of state-controlled large industrial and agrarian corporations. He argued that the USSR could not follow the Western path of development as it represented a unique historico-cultural civilization, stating that the Russian "Orthodox–Muslim, Eastern communitarian tradition" was at odds with Western individualism, and that liberal capitalism was bound to fail in Russia. According to Kurginyan, the USSR could have saved itself by committing all amenable political forces around the "salvation of the country and the State", which he described as committing the USSR to development based on geopolitical realities, "cultural-historical uniqueness", and traditions and resources. He contended that through retaining command economy and empowering security forces, USSR would have developed rapidly as a leading economic power and a new type of civilisation. In a declaration written together with the members of his movement, Kurginyan described his ideology:

We declare that the foundation for building a state can only be the nation. (…) Nationalism understood as the consciousness of the spiritual and material unity of the national ‘We’ (…) is the natural and noble emotion of an individual identifying himself with the nation, as well as one of the most powerful integrating socio-national factors. (…) In Orthodoxy and in the collectivist traditions of Russian culture there is no place for the ‘primacy of the laws of Man’. The attempt to implant this idea by force into the Russian soil will invariably lead to the loss of Russian cultural-historical roots, to war of everyone with everyone. (…) The Russian Way is a new Russian communism, a new Russian national traditionalism, a native, Russian, nonatheistic, non-liberalist humanism!

Kurginyan postulated a program called "post-perestroika", which was to renew and preserve the USSR following Gorbachev's destabilizing reforms. It was considered "a fusion of communism, nationalism and Orthodox Christianity"; imbuing communism with Christianity, he stressed the need to revert liberal reforms and transform Soviet ministries into state corporations. Soviet managers would become "knights and priests of the red faith" to safeguard the preservation of the Soviet command economy and loyalty to the communist cause. Kurginyan saw it as necessary to demonstrate that communism in Russia was not accidental but instead had "deep metaphysical roots" in Russian tradition. According to Kurginyan, the modernization of the USSR could only succeed if carried out without dependence on foreign credits, and required both preserving the Soviet total dominance of state in the economy and transforming the communist doctrine into one capable of imposing greater discipline. Walter Laquer characterized Kurginyan's renewed communist doctrine as "a monasticascetic metareligion combining spiritual communism with Christianity (both fundamentalist and Teilhardian), Russian patriotism, anti-Westemism, [and] Third Worldism". Laquer added that Kurginyan proposes a "form of national or state socialism".

His views were described as close to that of 1920s National Bolsheviks and he was considered a representative of a hardline CPSU tendency that sought to develop a form of nationalist socialism. Kurginyan attached the survival of the USSR to an embrace of a collectivist, Slavophile nationalism. Rejecting capitalism as a product of individualist societies alien to the collectivist "Eastern type of civilisation", Kurginyan saw Soviet socialism as something based on the Russian tradition and cultural nature; to him, Russia was destined to have a "command economy, political centralisation, and authoritarianism". On communism, he stated: "Communism is not just an invention, but the historical destiny of the peoples inhabiting our country and as long as our State lives, it will not change this path." He also postulated a need for Soviet communists to ally themselves with the Russian Orthodox Church, stating the importance of defending Russian traditions and defending Russia against Western institutions.

Kurginyan advocates the restoration of the Soviet Union. He has declared that the purpose of his life is to bring back the USSR. Kurginyan calls for the unification of Russia and Belarus "at all costs"; Kurginyan advocates "Soviet Union 2.0"; his movement, the Essence of Time, has the establishment of "Soviet Union 2.0" as its objective, seeing the dissolution of the USSR as a great tragedy. The Soviet Union 2.0 is to be a nationalist and conservative country, promoting "extremely conservative values in the cultural sphere" and the patriarchal model of the family. The Essence of Time regularly sent supplies to pro-Russian rebels in Donetsk and Luhansk, and apart from seeking to re-establish the USSR, it also pledges "bringing to account" those responsible for its fall. It asserts:

We suffer the Soviet Union’s collapse as a defeat for our nation and our own personal defeat. But we have not capitulated. We are ready to continue the fight and be victorious.

Kurginyan saw the October Revolution as fully justified, arguing that the Bolsheviks acted in the name of the Russian civilization as they "prevented the collapse into chaos of the Russian State". He strongly supported the 1991 August coup, and claimed that he was the coup's ideologue; Irish historian Judith Devlin stated that while Kurginyan's influence on the August coup is hard to measure, "he certainly prepared the ground for it ideologically". Kurginyan's synthesis of Soviet Marxism with messianic Russian nationalism is considered to have strongly influenced Gennady Zyuganov of the Communist Party of the Russian Federation. Devlin noted that Zyuganov espoused an understanding of Soviet socialism identical to that of Kurginyan, seeing it as a battle of civilizations, between the individualist and capitalist West, and the communist and collectivist East. Because of his strong influence on communist hardliners, liberal press labelled Kurginyan "Soviet Grigory Rasputin", "mysterious advisor for the Kremlin leaders", "the last mystical hope of the neo-Bolsheviks", and "the savior of the CPSU". In the 2000s, Kurginyan was an early proponent of the Russian invasion of Ukraine, condemning the Orange Revolution as a threat to Russian sovereignty, and comparing a struggle against it to the Great Patriotic War.

While his political views have been described as approaching proto-fascism by some, Kurginyan rejected the proposals of a unity between the communists and neo-fascists, and condemned Russian political movements that celebrated Mussolini or national socialism. Kurginyan instead warned of a "fascistization of Russia" and also heavily criticized Aleksandr Dugin, the similarities of their ideological doctrines notwithstanding. He never abandoned the Marxist concept of fascism being a product of capitalism; he warned that the spread of capitalist values in the former Soviet Union would create conditions for the emergence of fascism. Kurginyan decried an emerging "fascist consensus in a society whose immunity to fascism has been destroyed" in Russia, and warned Russian Nazis against "flirting with the black poodle", arguing that Russian fascism is not Russian patriotism. He had also strongly rejected Eurasianism. Nevertheless, his ideas were appropriated by the Izborsky Club of Dugin and Alexander Prokhanov, which postulated a "red-white-brown" coalition between communists (red), Tsarist nostalgics (white), and fascists (brown).
