= Seven Bankers =

Group of Russian oligarchs

- Semibankirshchina
- Russian: семибанкирщина
- Romanization: semibankirshchina
- IPA: [sʲɪmʲɪbɐnˈkʲirɕːɪnə]
- Literal meaning: rule of seven bankers

The Seven Bankers (Russian: семибанкирщина, romanized: semibankirshchina) were a group of powerful Russian oligarchs who played an important role in the political and economic spheres of the Russian Federation between 1996 and 2000. In spite of their internal conflicts, members of the group worked together in order to re-elect Boris Yeltsin in the 1996 Russian presidential election, and thereafter to successfully manipulate him and his political environment from behind the scenes.

Initially, the clique of seven businessmen were identified by oligarch Boris Berezovsky in an October 1996 interview. In an article published on 14 November 1996, journalist Andrei Fadin coined the term semibankirshchina as a takeoff on the Seven Boyars who deposed Tsar Vasili Shuisky in 1610 during the Time of Troubles. Later, other persons were included in the list, but the catchy term remained.

== Origins ==
Russian oligarch Boris Berezovsky, in a 29 October 1996 interview in the Financial Times, named seven Russian bankers and businessmen from six businesses that he claimed controlled about 50% of the economy of Russia and most of the mass media in Russia, and had helped bankroll Boris Yeltsin's re-election campaign in 1996.

The word semibankirshchina was subsequently coined by the Russian journalist Andrei Fadin of the Obshchaya Gazeta newspaper, in a 14 November 1996 article titled "Semibankirshchina as a New Russian Variation of Semiboyarshchina". He wrote that "they control the access to budget money and basically all investment opportunities inside the country. They own the gigantic information resource of the major TV channels. They form the President's opinion. Those who didn't want to walk along them were either strangled or left the circle." Slightly over a year later, Fadin was killed in a car accident. Aleksandr Solzhenitsyn also used this word in his critical 1998 essay Russia Under Avalanche to describe the current political regime and to warn people of what he considered an organized crime syndicate that controlled the President and 70% of all Russian money.

Berezovsky named the following seven persons: Stolichny Bank head Alexander Smolensky; Mikhail Khodorkovsky, president of the Menatep financial and oil empire; Petr Aven and Mikhail Fridman, of Alfa-Bank; Vladimir Gusinsky, head of the Most banking and media group; Vladimir Potanin, former head of ONEXIM Bank and then–first deputy prime minister in charge of the economy; and Berezovsky himself.

In some lists some other people were included, and eventually the clique was recognized to consist of:

- Boris Berezovsky – United Bank, Sibneft, ORT
- Mikhail Fridman and Petr Aven – Alfa Group
- Vladimir Gusinsky – Most Group, NTV
- Mikhail Khodorkovsky – Bank Menatep, Yukos
- Vladimir Potanin – ONEXIM Bank
- Alexander Smolensky – Stolichny Bank
- Vladimir Vinogradov – Inkombank
- Vitaly Malkin – Rossiysky Kredit

Petr Aven, who was close to Berezovsky, describes appearance of the word semibankirshchina in his book The Age of Berezovsky as follows: "He [Berezovsky] didn't use this word, but he gave an interview to the Financial Times in which he said that seven businessmen were de facto ruling the country. He named a fairly random list — whomever he could recall at the time. I was listed together with Fridman; there was one representative of each group there."

== History ==
It is generally considered that the group was created in March 1996 when the political consultant Sergey Kurginyan invited a group of thirteen Russian oligarchs to sign the so-called "Letter of Thirteen" (headlined as "Come Out of the Dead End!") in an attempt to cancel the 1996 Russian presidential election. The manifest was published in Nezavisimaya Gazeta and suggested that two major candidates—Boris Yeltsin and the Communist leader Gennady Zyuganov—should strike a "political compromise" in order to prevent "the economical collapse". It contained eight tips that described the position of business elites. The letter was called "a provocation" by the Communists and thus ignored.

After the plan failed, half of those oligarchs formed what became known as the Seven Bankers—a group of business moguls, later ironically named after the 17th-century Seven Boyars, who owned the majority of Russian media resources and who decided to promote Boris Yeltsin every way possible. Since Yeltsin was highly unpopular by that time, with only 3–8% support, a complex technology of crowd manipulation was developed by Gleb Pavlovsky and Marat Gelman's think tank Foundation for Effective Politics, with the involvement of American specialists (the latter fact was used as a basis for the comedy film Spinning Boris released in 2003).

Known as an extremely "dirty" election campaign both inside and outside of Russia, it was discussed in detail in Gleb Pavlovsky's report President in 1996: Scenarios and Technologies of the Victory published shortly after. As Nezavisimaya Gazeta summarized it, "the formula of victory: attracting the expert resources + dominating in the information field + blocking the competitor's moves + dominating in mass media + dominating in elites". The main analyst of the NTV TV channel Vsevolod Vilchek also admitted that they actively applied technologies of mass manipulation. Both the third president of Russia, Dmitry Medvedev, and the former president of the Soviet Union, Mikhail Gorbachev, have since claimed that Yeltsin's victory was hoaxed.

Following the election, the Seven Bankers became the main power behind Russian politics and economy. Between 1996 and 2000, they gained control over the most valuable state enterprises in the natural resource and metal sectors and unofficially manipulated Yeltsin and his decisions. According to Boris Berezovsky, they acted through Anatoly Chubais—an architect of privatization in Russia and Yeltsin's right-hand man who granted access to him at any time.

All this resulted in further impoverishment of the population, criminalization of businesses and the 1998 Russian financial crisis. This was also the time when the word oligarch grew in popularity, substituting the New Russian nouveau riche term (both with extremely negative subtext). The 1999 saw the sudden rise to power of the unknown FSB officer Vladimir Putin. Boris Berezovsky and his associates claimed that it was him who single-handedly promoted Putin and insisted on his candidature as Prime Minister and President.

Yet the following years saw a quick demise of most of the Seven Bankers and the rise of the new generation of "manageable" Russian oligarchy. Khodorkovsky, Berezovsky and Gusinsky turned into personae non gratae in Russia. Berezovsky and Gusinsky left Russia in 2000, while Khodorkovsky lost his business as well as freedom in 2003 and was exiled in 2013. Vinogradov died in 2008. On 23 March 2013, Berezovsky was found dead at his home, Titness Park, at Sunninghill, near Ascot in Berkshire. Smolensky still owned significant companies till 2019, but lost his political influence. He died in 2024.

== See also ==
- Loans for shares scheme
