= Russian oligarchs =

Business oligarchs of the former Soviet republics

Russian oligarchs

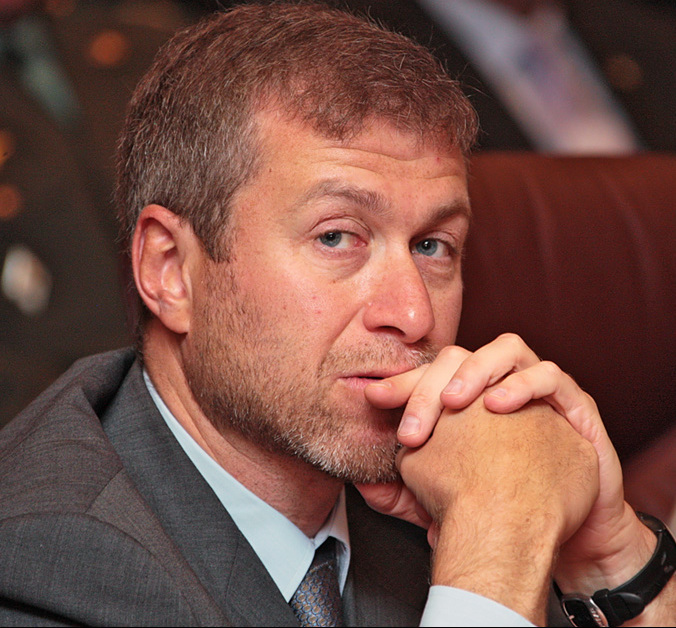
Roman Abramovich

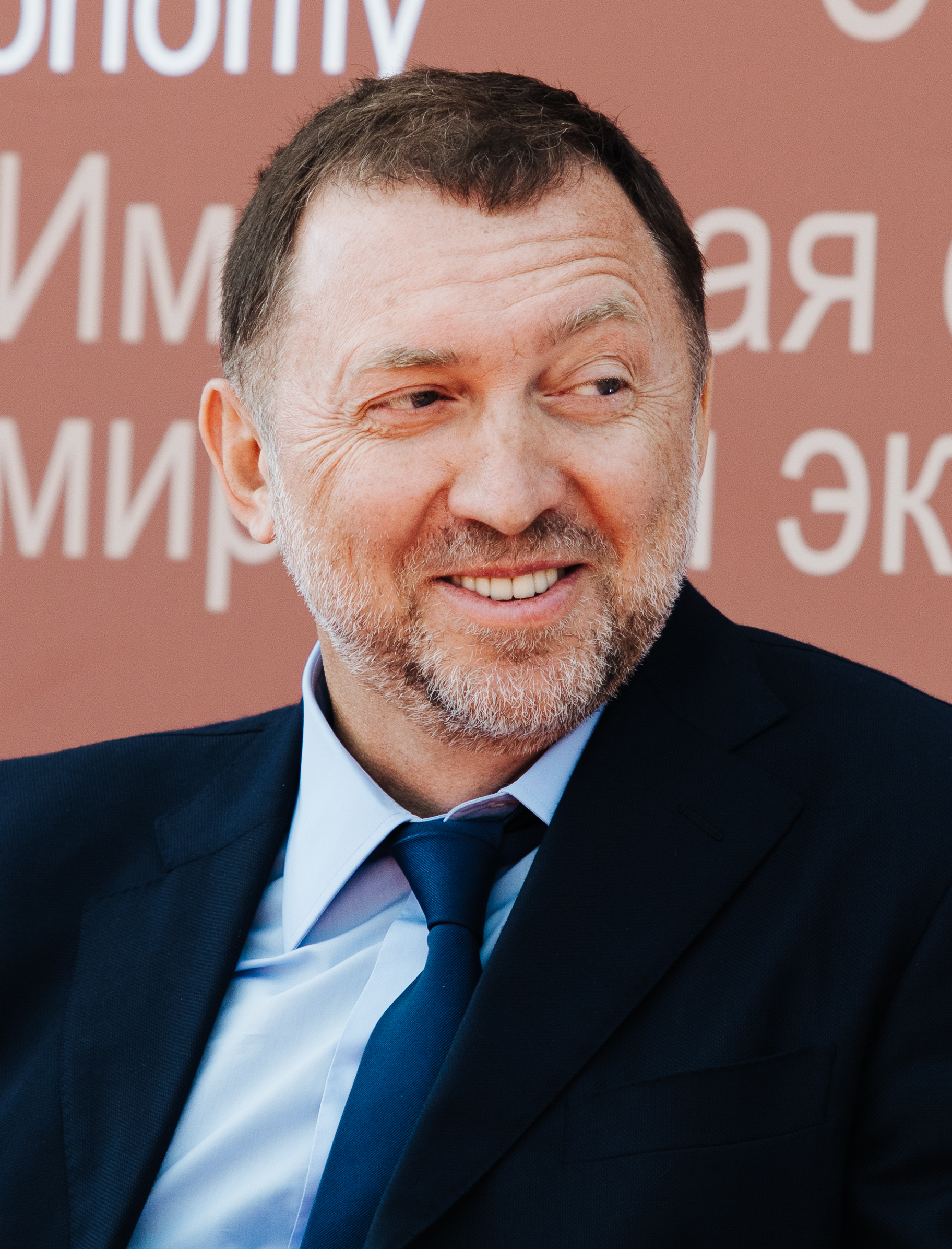
Oleg Deripaska

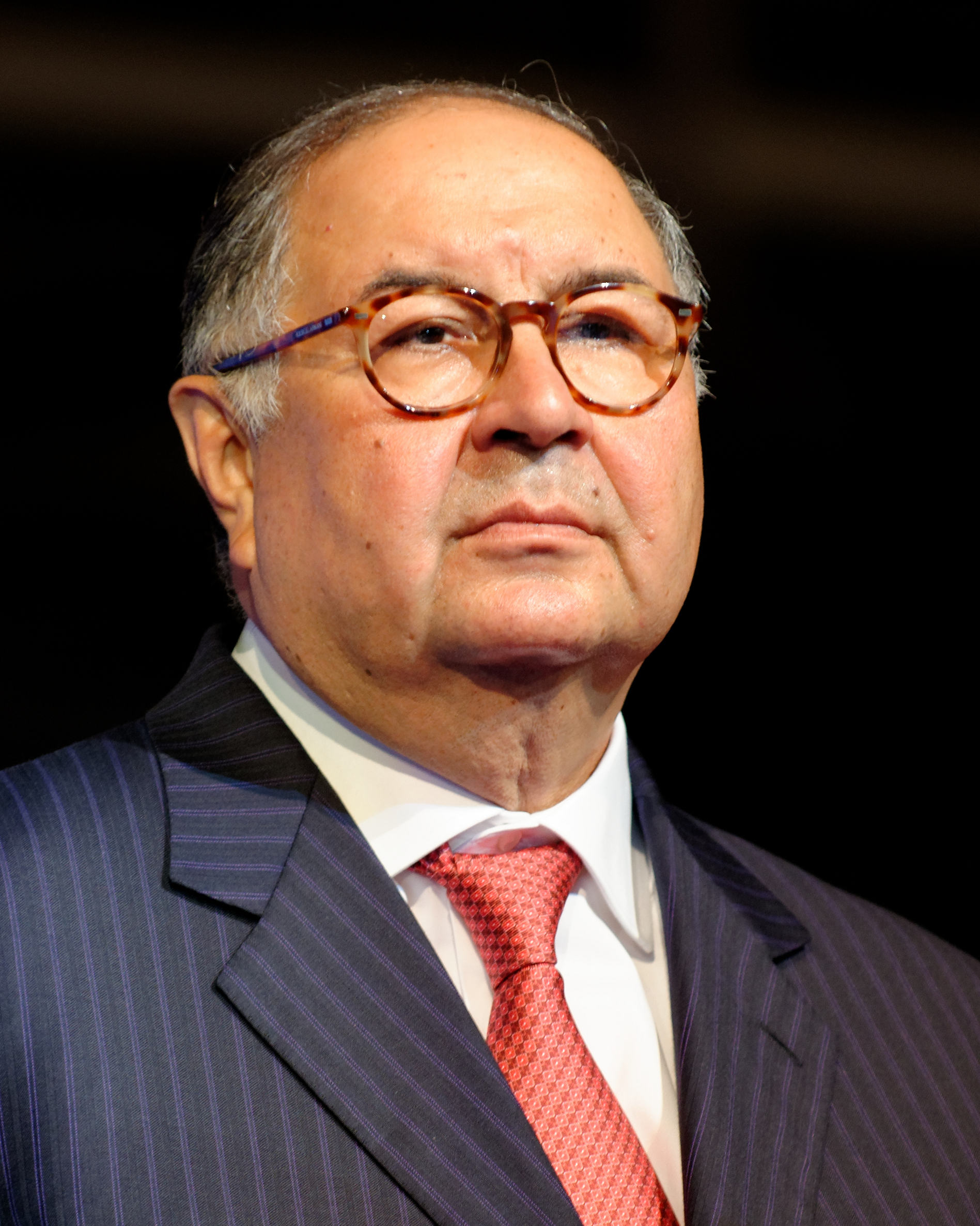
Alisher Usmanov

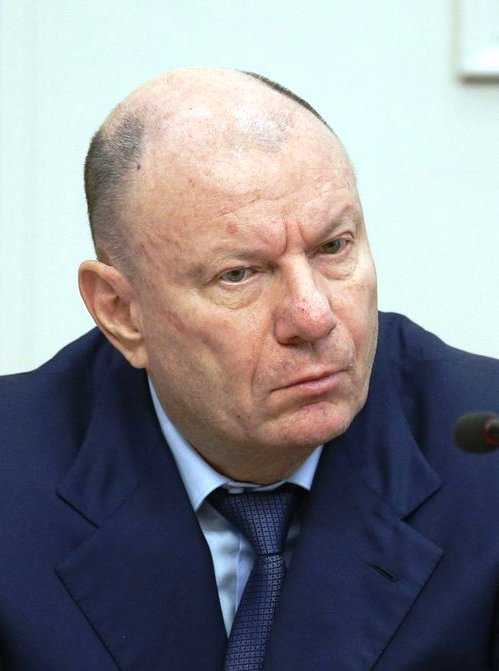
Vladimir Potanin

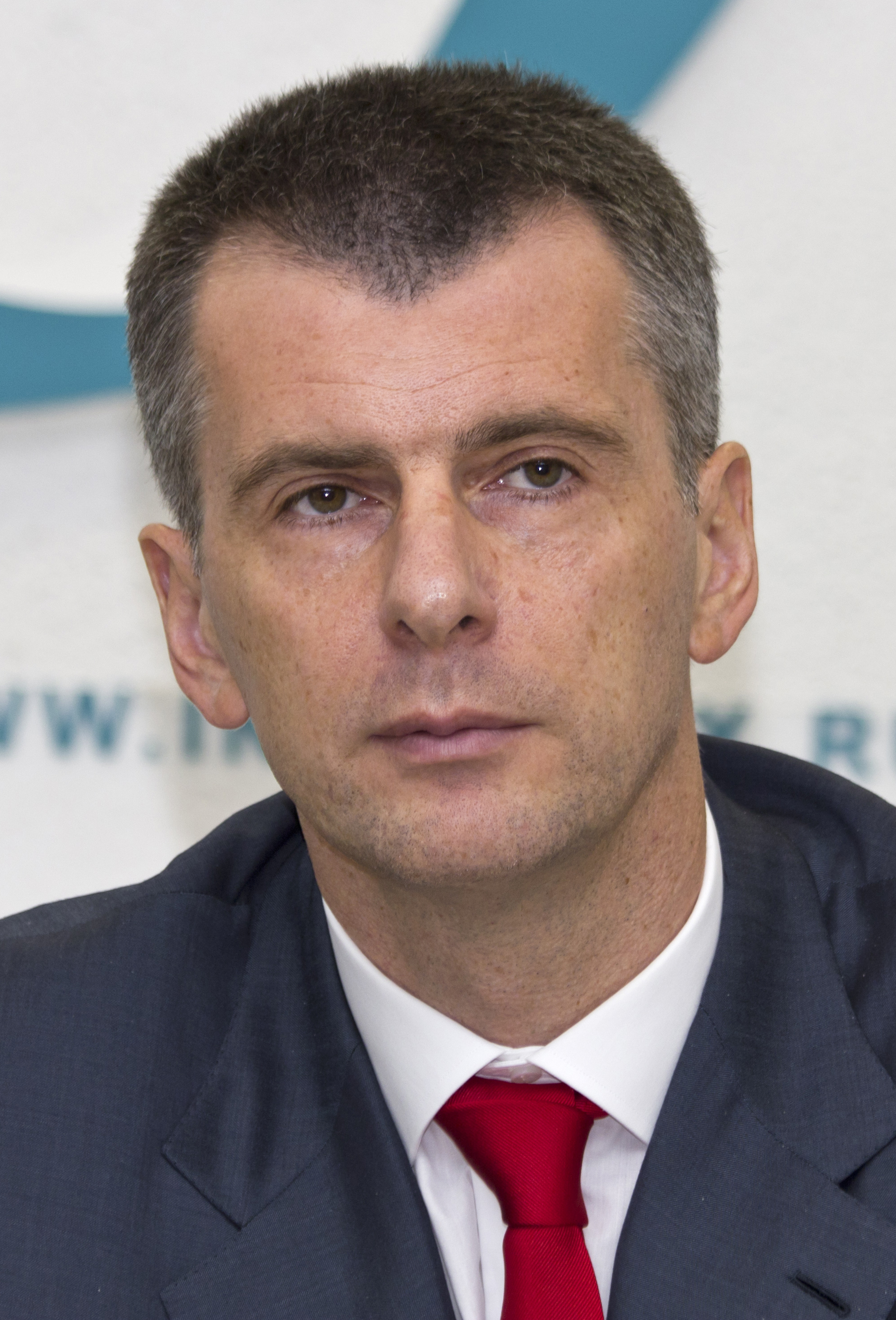
Mikhail Prokhorov

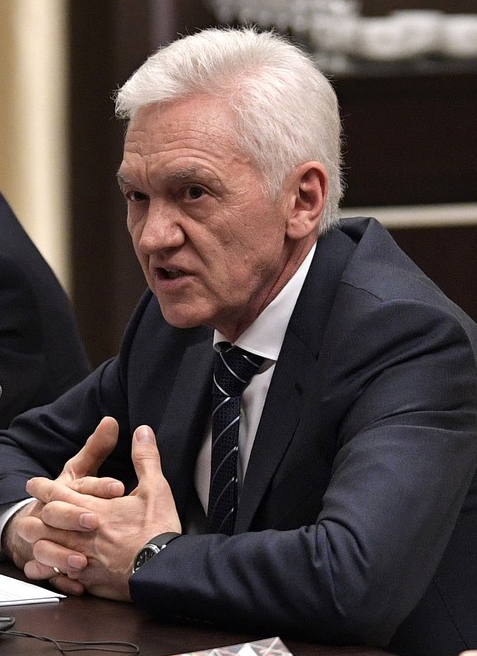
Gennady Timchenko

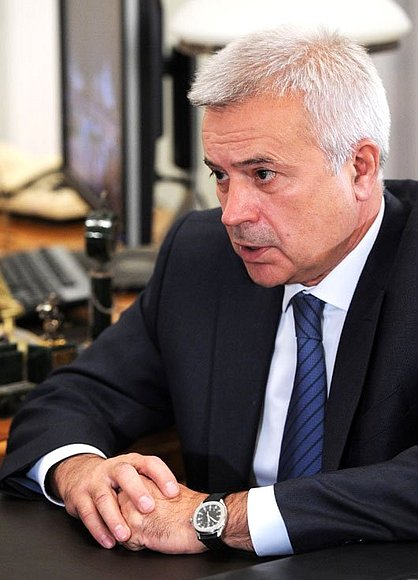
Vagit Alekperov

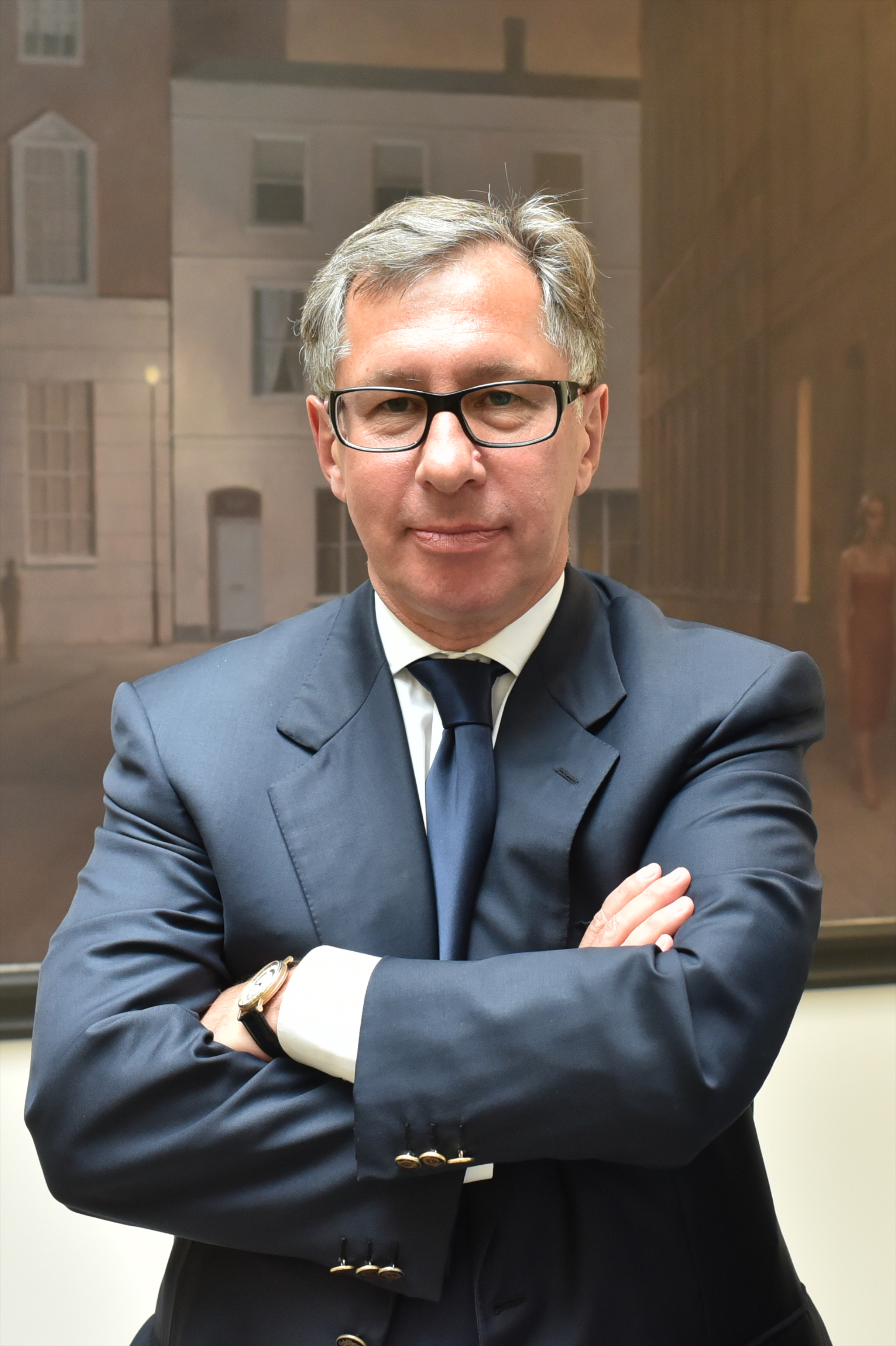
Petr Aven

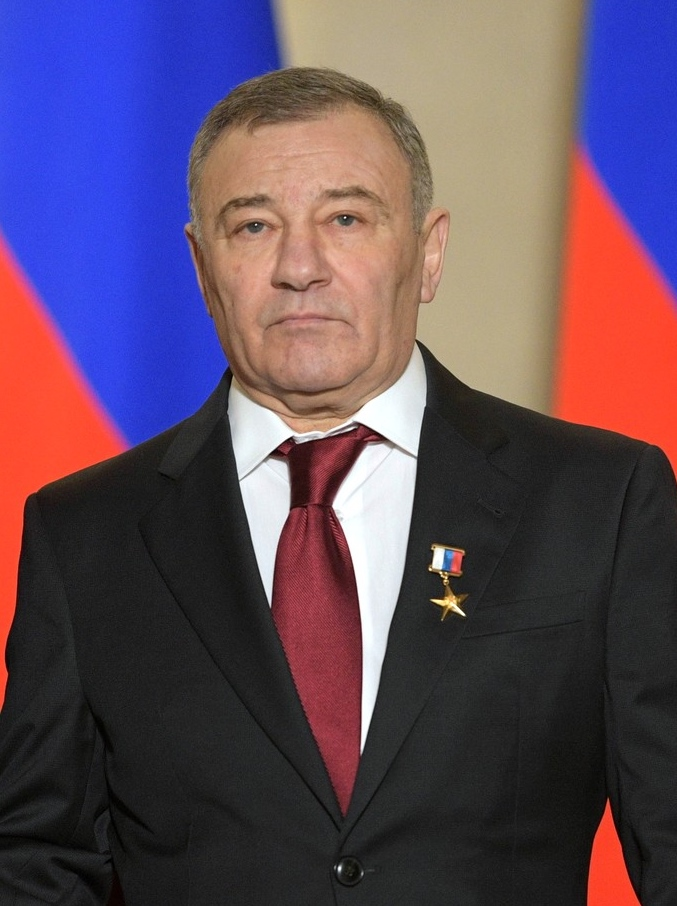
Arkady Rotenberg

Russian oligarchs (Russian: олигархи, romanized: oligarkhi) are wealthy business tycoons from Russia who possess significant political influence or close ties to the state. The phenomenon originally emerged during the 1990s, when a first generation of entrepreneurs rapidly acquired state assets through privatisation following the dissolution of the Soviet Union. Under Vladimir Putin, a second wave of state-aligned oligarchs gained prominence through government contracts, state monopolies, and connections with the security services (siloviki).

The Russian oligarchs first emerged as entrepreneurs under Mikhail Gorbachev (General Secretary, 1985–1991), exploiting various loopholes during the economic liberalisation of his perestroika programme. Boris Berezovsky, a mathematician and former researcher, became the first widely recognised Russian business oligarch.

The oligarchs became increasingly influential in Russian politics during the presidency of Boris Yeltsin (1991–1999), a period often referred to as the wild nineties; they helped finance his re-election in 1996. Well-connected oligarchs such as Roman Abramovich, Mikhail Khodorkovsky, Boris Berezovsky and Vladimir Potanin acquired key assets at a fraction of their value at the loans for shares scheme auctions conducted in the run-up to the election. Defenders of the oligarchs who later fell out of favour have argued that the companies they acquired were not highly valued at the time because they continued to operate on Soviet principles, with non-existent stock control, huge payrolls, no financial reporting and scant regard for profit.

Since 2014, hundreds of Russian oligarchs and their companies have been subject to US sanctions for their support of "the Russian government's malign activity around the globe". In 2022, many Russian oligarchs and their close family members were targeted and sanctioned by countries around the world in response to Russia's war in Ukraine.

== Yeltsin era, 1991–1999 ==
During Mikhail Gorbachev's perestroika period (c. 1985–1991), Soviet economic restructuring allowed limited private enterprise, enabling many entrepreneurs in Russia to import high-demand goods such as personal computers, electronics, and clothing (e.g. jeans). These goods, scarce in the Soviet market, were sold at significant profits, laying the groundwork for the rise of a new business class.

Following the dissolution of the Soviet Union in 1991, Boris Yeltsin became President of Russia in July 1991, the oligarchs emerged as well-connected entrepreneurs who started from nearly nothing and became rich through participation in the market via connections to the corrupt, but elected, government of Russia during the state's transition to a market-based economy. The so-called voucher privatization program of 1992–1994 enabled a handful of young men to become billionaires, specifically by arbitraging the vast difference between old domestic prices for Russian commodities (such as natural gas and oil) and the prices prevailing on the world market. These oligarchs became unpopular with the Russian public and are often blamed for the turmoil that plagued the Russian Federation following the collapse of the Soviet Union in 1991.

=== Emergence ===
Economists Sergei Guriev and Andrei Rachinsky contrast older oligarchs with nomenklatura ties and younger-generation entrepreneurs such as Kakha Bendukidze who built their wealth from scratch because Gorbachev's reforms affected a period "when co-existence of regulated and quasi-market prices created huge opportunities for arbitrage."

The majority of oligarchs were promoted (at least initially) by the Soviet apparatchiks, with strong connections to Soviet power-structures and access to the funds of the Communist Party. Boris Berezovsky himself was Head of the Department of System Design at another Academy of Sciences research centre. His private company was established by the Institute as a joint venture. Mikhail Khodorkovsky started his business importing computers under auspices of the Komsomol-authorised Center for Scientific and Technical Creativity of the Youth in 1986, briefly serving as a deputy secretary of the Komsomol for a district in Moscow in 1987. His move into banking two years later was funded with the support of Komsomol alumni working in Moscow city government. Later, he served in the Russian government as an adviser to the prime minister and a deputy minister of fuel and power while still running his business. Vladimir Vinogradov was the chief economist of Promstroybank, one of the six banks existing in the Soviet Union, previously serving as the secretary of Atommash plant Komsomol organisation.

=== Political support ===
Economist Yegor Gaidar worked in a Soviet Academy of Sciences think tank modelled after RAND. Gaidar later became the economics editor of the Kommunist journal, the official theoretical organ of the CC of the CPSU. He also held various positions, including Prime Minister in the Russian government during 1991–1992. Together with Anatoly Chubais, the two "Young Reformers" were chiefly responsible for privatization in the early 1990s. According to David Satter, "what drove the process was not the determination to create a system based on universal values but rather the will to introduce a system of private ownership, which, in the absence of law, opened the way for the criminal pursuit of money and power".

The 1998 Russian financial crisis hit most oligarchs hard and those whose holdings were based mainly in banking lost much of their fortunes. The most influential oligarchs from the Yeltsin era include Roman Abramovich, Boris Berezovsky, Vladimir Gusinsky, Mikhail Khodorkovsky, Vladimir Potanin, Alexander Smolensky and Vladimir Vinogradov. They formed what became known as the Semibankirschina (or "seven-banker outfit",), a group of businessmen with a great influence on Boris Yeltsin and his political environment. Together they controlled from 50% to 70% of all Russian finances between 1996 and 2000. Historian Edward L. Keenan has compared these oligarchs to the system of powerful boyars that emerged in late-medieval Muscovy. The Guardian reported in 2008 that "'oligarchs' from the era of former president Boris Yeltsin have been purged by the Kremlin".

== Putin and Medvedev era, 1999–2022 (prior to the invasion of Ukraine) ==
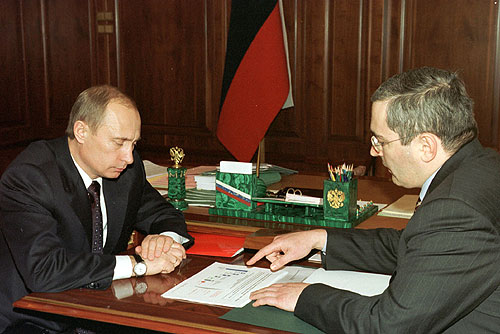
Putin (left), with Mikhail Khodorkovsky (right) in December 2002. Mikhail Khodorkovsky was jailed the following year.

With the ascent of Vladimir Putin in the Kremlin the influence of the Yeltsin oligarchs dissipated, as some were imprisoned, such as Mikhail Khodorkovsky (pictured here) and Mikhael Mirilashvili, while others emigrated, sold off their assets or died under suspicious circumstances, such as Vladimir Vinogradov and Boris Berezovsky. A number of Yeltsin oligarchs first came under fire for alleged tax evasion. Vladimir Gusinsky of MediaMost and Boris Berezovsky both avoided legal proceedings by leaving Russia, and the most prominent, Mikhail Khodorkovsky of Yukos oil, was arrested in October 2003 and sentenced to 9 years. This was subsequently extended to 14 years, and after Putin pardoned him, he was released on 20 December 2013.

A second wave of oligarchs emerged in the 2000s, friends and former colleagues of President Putin either from his years in the St Petersburg municipal administration or his Dresden tenure in the KGB. Examples are the director of the institute where Putin obtained a degree in 1996, Vladimir Litvinenko, and Putin's childhood friend and judo-teacher Arkady Rotenberg. Gennady Timchenko was close friends with Russian leader Vladimir Putin since the early 1980s. In 1991, Putin gave Timchenko an oil export license. These oligarchs worked in close cooperation with the government, displacing a system of crony capitalism with a system of state capitalism whereby the new oligarchs benefited from financing by state-owned banks and access to public procurement projects.

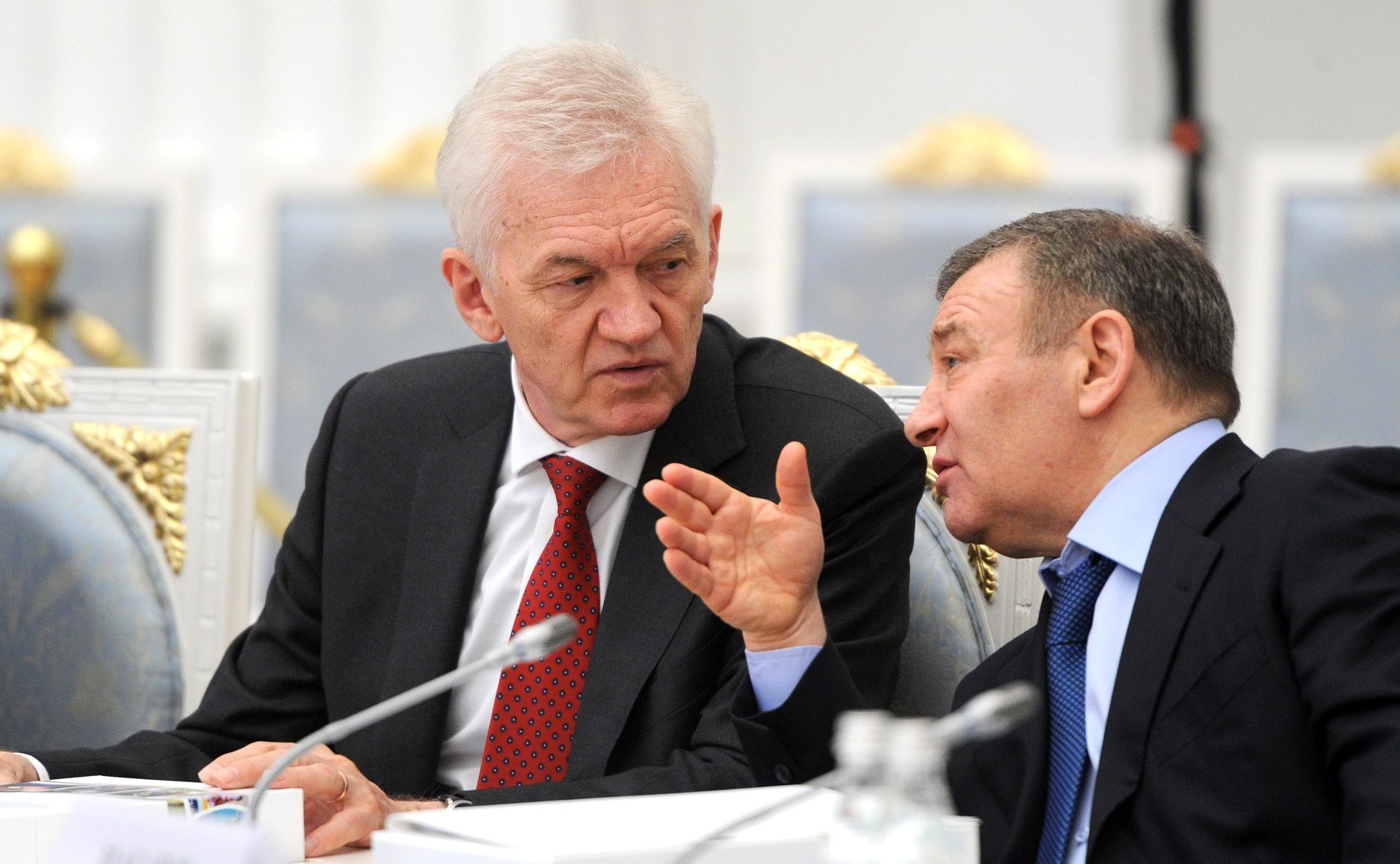
Gennady Timchenko and Arkady Rotenberg in 2015

An economic study distinguished 21 oligarchic groups as of 2003. Between 2000 and 2004, Putin apparently engaged in a power struggle with some oligarchs, reaching a "grand bargain" with them. This bargain allowed the oligarchs to maintain their powers, in exchange for their explicit support of – and alignment with – Putin's government. However, other analysts argue that the oligarchic structure has remained intact under Putin, with Putin devoting much of his time to mediating power-disputes between rival oligarchs.

=== Prominent oligarchs ===
The ten most-prominent oligarchs of the early Putin era were Roman Abramovich, Oleg Deripaska, Mikhail Prokhorov, Alisher Usmanov, Viktor Vekselberg, Leonid Mikhelson, Arkady Rotenberg, Gennady Timchenko, Andrey Guryev and Vitaly Malkin. In 2004, five years after Putin's ascent to power, Forbes listed 36 billionaires of Russian citizenship, with a note: "this list includes businessmen of Russian citizenship who acquired the major share of their wealth privately, while not holding a governmental position". In 2005, the number of billionaires dropped to 30, mostly because of the Yukos case, with Khodorkovsky dropping from No. 1 (US$15.2 billion) to No. 21 (US$2.0 billion). A 2013 report by Credit Suisse found that 35% of the wealth of Russia was owned by the wealthiest 110 individuals.

Daniel Treisman proposed using a term "silovarch" (silovik and oligarch) for a new class of Russian oligarchs with backgrounds in Russian military and intelligence.

On 30 January 2018, the U.S. Treasury published a "list of oligarchs" as part of a document known as the "Putin list" which was compiled under the requirement of the CAATSA Act. According to the document itself, its criterion for inclusion was simply being a Russian national with a net worth of over $1 billion. The list was criticised for being indiscriminate, and including critics of Putin.

=== 2008 global recession and credit crisis ===
According to the financial news-agency Bloomberg L.P., Russia's wealthiest 25 individuals collectively lost US$230 billion (£146 billion) from July 2008 to July 2017. The fall in the oligarchs' wealth relates closely to the meltdown in Russia's stock market, as by 2008 the RTS Index had lost 71% of its value due to the capital flight after the Russo-Georgian War of August 2008.

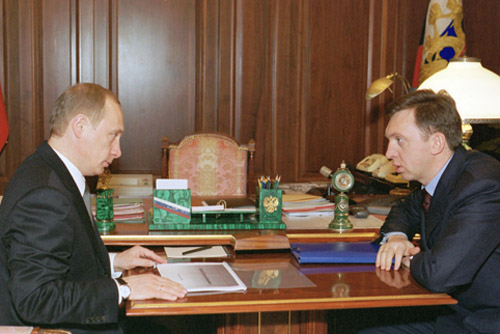
Putin (left) with Oleg Deripaska (right) in the Kremlin in March 2002

Billionaires in Russia were particularly hard-hit by lenders seeking repayment on balloon loans to shore up their own balance sheets. Many oligarchs took out generous loans from Russian banks, bought shares, and then took out more loans from western banks against the value of these shares. One of the first to get hit by the global downturn was Oleg Deripaska, Russia's richest man at the time, who had a net worth of US$28 billion in March 2008. As Deripaska borrowed money from western banks using shares in his companies as collateral, the collapse in share price forced him to sell holdings to satisfy the margin calls.

== Putin era, 2022 invasion of Ukraine and international sanctions ==
After the 2022 Russian invasion of Ukraine, Canadian, US, European, and Japanese leaders took unprecedented steps to sanction Putin and the oligarchs directly. In response to the sanctions, the targeted oligarchs started to hide wealth in an attempt to prevent the Western nations from freezing their assets. These sanctions intend to directly impact the Russian ruling class as a response for their perceived contribution and acquiescence to the war with Ukraine. Although the sanctions miss some of the richest oligarchs, the impact on the war is unknown due to Putin's power over those that were sanctioned. Since the invasion began, nine of the Russian oligarchs' yachts have turned their navigation transponders off as they sail to ports where they are less likely to be searched and seized.

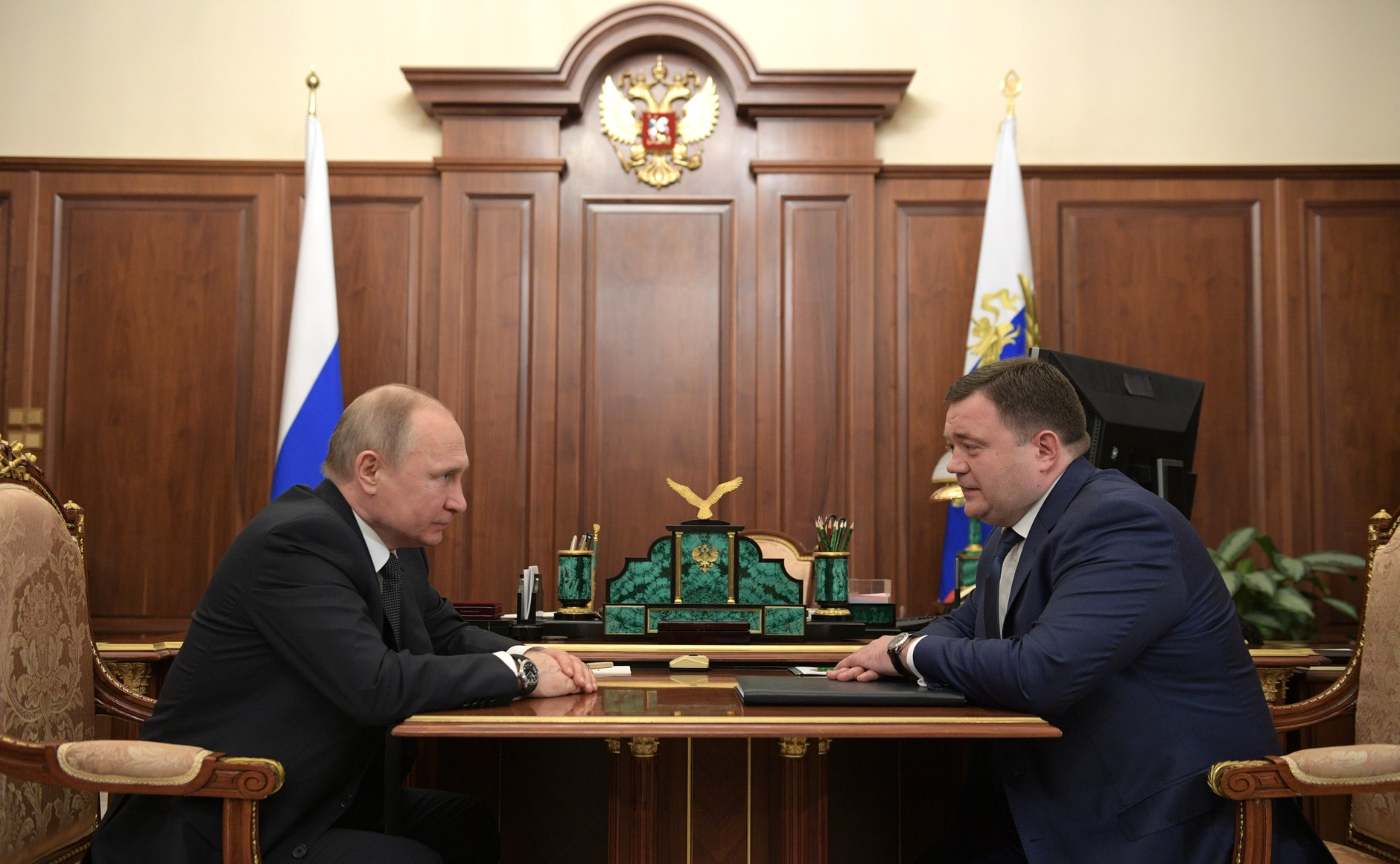
Putin (left), with Petr Fradkov (right) in the Kremlin in May 2019

On March 2, 2022, the United States announced a special task force dubbed "Task Force KleptoCapture". This team was put together to specifically target oligarchs. It is made up of officials from the FBI, Marshals Service, IRS, Postal Inspection Service, Homeland Security Investigations and Secret Service. The main goal of the task force is to impose the sanctions set against these individuals to freeze and seize the assets that the US government claimed were proceeds of their illegal involvement with the Russian government and the invasion of Ukraine. On March 21, 2022, the Organized Crime and Corruption Reporting Project launched Russian Asset Tracker to showcase the profiles and assets of several Russian oligarchs.

Several dozen business people with family connections to top politicians include President Putin's younger daughter Katerina Tikhonova, who through her investment fund has been the recipient of numerous large contracts from state-owned energy companies. Her former husband Kirill Shamalov runs the largest Russian petrochemicals company Sibur as well as his own investment fund.

The son-in-law of Foreign Minister Sergei Lavrov, Alexander Vinokurov, runs an investment fund with extensive corporate holdings. Andrey Ryumin, the son-in-law of pro-Russian Ukrainian politician Viktor Medvedchuk, heads Russia's power grid operator Rosseti. Several children of senior officials, including Petr Fradkov (son of former Prime Minister Mikhail Fradkov), Sergei S. Ivanov (son of former Chief of Staff Sergei Ivanov), and Andrey Patrushev (son of former Security Council Secretary Nikolai Patrushev), have likewise been appointed to senior executive positions in major state-linked enterprises.

During the invasion of Ukraine, the Russian government increased financial demands on big business and initiated a process of "deprivatisation". In 2023, the government introduced a one-off windfall tax on companies with annual profits over 1 billion rubles, which collected over 300 billion rubles for the state budget. Russian prosecutors also seized dozens of major private companies through court orders, such as car dealer Rolf, food producer Makfa, and several metallurgical plants, and transferred their assets to the state or to figures tied to the security services.

Several Russian business figures challenged their international sanctions in foreign courts. In April 2024, the General Court of the European Union annulled the 2022–2023 EU sanctions on Mikhail Fridman and Petr Aven. The court ruled that the European Council had presented insufficient evidence of their support for the war, although both men remained under subsequent sanctions packages. In September 2026, the European Union removed Fridman and Alisher Usmanov from its sanctions list under a political compromise among member states, though both remained subject to sanctions by the United States and the United Kingdom.

The list of oligarchs and business executives who have risen to prominence and who have been sanctioned after Russia's invasion of Ukraine includes:

- Petr Fradkov (CEO of Promstroybank, son of Mikhail Fradkov, former Russian Prime Minister during 2004–2007. Mikhail Fradkov is the longest serving director of Russia's Foreign Intelligence Service from 2007 to 2016. Since 4 January 2017, Fradkov has been Director of the Russian Institute for Strategic Studies.)
- Andrey Guryev (the former head of PhosAgro, the world's fourth largest producer of phosphate-based fertilizers)
- Mikhail Gutseriev (former owner of Russneft, one of Russia's largest oil companies)
- Said Gutseriev (Russian-British businessperson, the son of Russian oligarch Mikhail Gutseriev. Since 2018 he has been included by Forbes into the list of wealthiest businessmen in the world. In 2021 his fortune has been estimated at $1.7 billion.
- Katerina Tikhonova (President Putin's second daughter and deputy chair of the Russian Union of Industrialists and Entrepreneurs)
- Kirill Shamalov (director and part-owner of Sibur, a Russian petrochemicals company)
- Andrey Valerievich Ryumin (executive director of Rosseti PJSC (formerly, until August 2014, known as Russian Grids, Chairman of Board, son-in-law of Viktor Medvedchuk. Medvedchuk is a pro-Kremlin Ukrainian politician and a personal friend of Russian President Vladimir Putin.)
- Andrey Patrushev (former executive at Gazprom Neft and son of former Security Council Secretary Nikolai Patrushev). He was sanctioned by the United States following the 2022 invasion of Ukraine.
- Sergei Sergeevich Ivanov (Board member of Gazprombank and president of Alrosa diamond mining; son of Sergei Ivanov, Minister of Defense of Russia from March 2001 to February 2007, Deputy Prime Minister from November 2005 to February 2007 and First Deputy Prime Minister from February 2007 to May 2008. After the election of Dmitry Medvedev as President of Russia, Ivanov was reappointed a Deputy Prime Minister (in office: 2008–2011) in Vladimir Putin's second cabinet. From December 2011 to August 2016, Ivanov worked as the Chief of Staff of the Presidential Executive Office. Having served in the Soviet KGB and in its successor, the Federal Security Service, Sergei Ivanov holds the rank of colonel general.)
- Ruben Vardanyan, former State Minister of Artsakh and former chief executive and principal partner of the Troika Dialog investment bank, which was at the center of the Troika Laundromat financial network. Described by commentators as closely tied to Russian leadership, he renounced his Russian citizenship in 2022 and moved to Nagorno-Karabakh. Following the Russian invasion of Ukraine, he was sanctioned by Ukraine due to his role on the board of air freight carrier Volga-Dnepr Airlines.
- Yevgeny Prigozhin, founder of the paramilitary the Wagner Group. In June 2023, the Wagner Group launched a rebellion against the Russian military, seizing control of the port city of Rostov-on-Don. Exactly two months later, on August 23, Prigozhin was killed in a plane crash that is suspected to have been orchestrated by Nikolai Patrushev, the head of the Security Council of Russia and Putin's right-hand man.
- Yury Slyusar (director of United Aircraft Corporation and board member of Aeroflot, Russian Airlines Pjsc and United Aircraft)
- Alexander Vinokurov (Owner of the privately held investment company Marathon Group (Russian company) and largest shareholder of retailer Magnit. Vinokurov is married to Ekaterina Vinokurova (née Lavrova) (born 1982 New York City), daughter of the Minister of Foreign Affairs of the Russian Federation Sergey Lavrov. Vinokurov was added to the EU Sanctions List on 9 March 2022 for providing a substantial source of revenue to the government of the Russian Federation during the Russo-Ukrainian War.

== Russian oligarchs in London ==
The British Government policy encouraged the flow of foreign capital into the United Kingdom, for example through the foreign investor visa routes, introduced during John Major's premiership in 1994, one-fifth of whose recipients since 2008 are Russian citizens.

A significant number of Russian oligarchs have bought homes in upmarket sections of London, which has been dubbed "Moscow on Thames" or "Londongrad". Some, such as Eugene Shvidler, Alexander Knaster, Konstantin Kagalovsky, David Wilkowske and Abram Reznikov, are expatriates, having taken permanent residency in London. Roman Abramovich bought 16 Kensington Palace Gardens in London, a 15-bedroom mansion, for £120 million. Mikhail Fridman restored Athlone House in London as a primary residence in 2016.

Roman Abramovich bought the English football club Chelsea F.C. in 2003, spending record amounts on players' salaries. Alexander Mamut invested £100m to Waterstones bookstore chain after acquiring it in 2011 for £53m. According to its managing director James Daunt, the intervention saved Waterstones, which managed to make its first annual profit since 2008 in 2016. He remarked that continued Russian ownership would've been "catastrophic" for the chain in 2022.

== Russian oligarchs in the Middle East ==
Dubai and Israel have been havens for oligarchs fleeing sanctions.

The UAE has become a prominent destination for relocation of yachts, real estate, and private banking services linked to sanctioned Russian elites. In May 2022, the 118-metre Motor Yacht A, owned by oligarch Andrey Melnichenko, was anchored in Ras al-Khaimah, UAE, where it remained largely intact despite international sanctions.

Russian purchases of UAE real estate also surged: Russians spent over US$6.3 billion on Dubai property in 2022 as non-resident buyers, many linked to high-net-worth individuals and oligarchs.

== See also ==
- Banking in Switzerland
- Business magnate
- Corruption in Russia
- List of Russian billionaires
- Media mogul
- New Russians
- Oligarchy
- Political groups under Vladimir Putin's presidency
- Privatization in Russia
- Reputation laundering
- Robber baron (industrialist)
- Russian Asset Tracker
- Russian mafia
- Sergei Magnitsky, Magnitsky Act
- Ukrainian mafia
- Ukrainian oligarchs
- Troika laundromat
