= Yuri Oleynikov =

Soviet-Russian politician (born 1951)

- Юрий Павлович Олейников
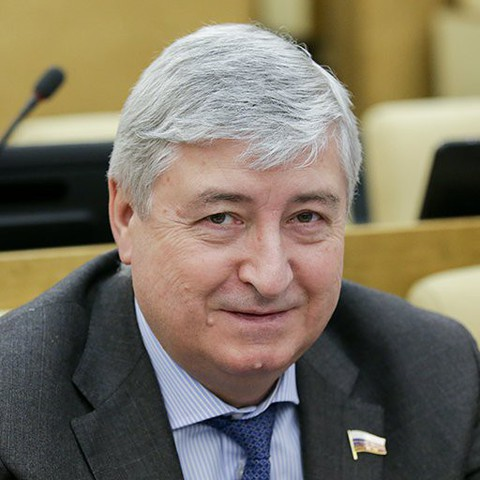

Member of the State Duma
- In office 2016–2019
- Constituency: 126th electoral district

Personal details
- Born: 13 June 1951 (age 75) Mingachevir, Azerbaijan SSR, Soviet Union
- Party: United Russia

Yuri Pavlovich Oleynikov (Юрий Павлович Олейников; 13 June 1951, Mingachevir, Azerbaijan SSR, Soviet Union) is a Russian politician and former member of the State Duma of the Federal Assembly of Russia. He was a member of the United Russia parliamentary faction and served as Deputy Chairman of the State Duma Committee on Financial Markets.

== Early life and education ==
Oleynikov graduated from Moscow State University in 1978 with a degree in history and qualification as a historian and teacher with knowledge of a foreign language. In 1987, he completed postgraduate studies at the Higher School of the All-Union Central Council of Trade Unions and defended his dissertation. He holds a Candidate of Sciences degree in history.

After completing school, Oleynikov worked at the Zelenokumsk Repair Plant in 1968–1969 as an apprentice fitter and second-class tool fitter. From 1969 to 1971, he served in the Soviet Armed Forces. After completing his military service, he entered Moscow State University.

== Political and professional career ==
After graduating from Moscow State University, Oleynikov was assigned to Ulyanovsk. From 1978, he worked in the city committee of the Komsomol and later in the propaganda and agitation department of the Ulyanovsk Regional Committee of the Communist Party of the Soviet Union.

From 1987 to 1991, he worked at the Higher School of the All-Union Central Council of Trade Unions as a lecturer and deputy dean.

From 1991 to 1996, Oleynikov headed the advertising and public relations department of Inkombank.

From 1996 to 1998, he worked at Norilsk Nickel, where he headed the company's foreign relations department.

In 2001–2002, Oleynikov served as deputy head for foreign relations in the administration of the governor of the Taymyr Autonomous Okrug, Alexander Khloponin. After Khloponin became head of the administration of Krasnoyarsk Krai, Oleynikov served as his deputy from 2002 to 2005.

From 2005 to 2008, he was Deputy Chairman of the Central Executive Committee of United Russia responsible for regional policy.

From 2008 to 2010, Oleynikov served as Deputy General Director of Norilsk Nickel.

From 2010 to 2012, he worked as a deputy in the office of Alexander Khloponin, the Plenipotentiary representative of the President of Russia in the North Caucasian Federal District.

From 2012 to 2013, Oleynikov served as First Deputy Chairman of the Government of Moscow Oblast.

From 2013 to 2015, he served as Vice Governor of Moscow Oblast for political affairs.

From 2015 to 2016, he served as Deputy Chairman of the Government of Moscow Oblast.

== State Duma ==
In September 2016, Oleynikov ran for the State Duma as a candidate of United Russia. Following the election, he was elected to the 7th State Duma from the 126th single-member electoral district.

He was a member of the United Russia faction and served as Deputy Chairman of the State Duma Committee on Financial Markets.

== Legislative activity ==
During his term as a member of the 7th State Duma from 2016 to 2019, Oleynikov was a co-author of nine legislative initiatives and amendments to federal bills.

== Awards ==
- Order of Honour (8 July 2011), for services in education and many years of productive work.
- Russian Government Letter of Appreciation (16 December 2019), for his contribution to the development of Russian parliamentarism and active legislative work.
