= Konstantin Kagalovsky =

Russian businessman (born 1957)

- Born: 13 October 1957 (age 68); Moscow, Russian SFSR, Soviet Union
- Citizenship: Russian & British
- Education: Moscow Finance Institute (PhD)
- Spouse: Natasha Kagalovsky (m. 1994)

Konstantin Grigoryevich Kagalovsky (Russian: Константин Григорьевич Кагаловский; born 13 October 1957) is a Russian businessman. He is the former vice-president of the oil company Yukos and a key Yukos shareholder, former deputy chairman of Bank Menatep, and the former Russian representative to the International Monetary Fund (IMF). Kagalovsky claims to be the owner of the Ukrainian TV channel TVi.

== Biography ==
In 1980, he graduated from the Moscow Finance Institute with a PhD in economics. In the late 1980s, he was a member of a group of young free-market economists, and was a close associate of Anatoly Chubais, who has been both praised and criticised for his involvement in the mass privatization of state assets after the fall of the Soviet Union.

Beginning in 1980, Kagalovsky worked in research institutes of the USSR State Planning Committee (Gosplan) (Russian: Госплан СССР) and the USSR Academy of Sciences (Russian: Академия наук СССР). In 1989, he founded and led the International Center for Research on Economic Reforms (Russian: Международный центр исследований экономических реформ).

In 1991 in a dacha outside Moscow, Kagalovsky, Andrey Vavilov, and three others developed an economic platform for Russia.

In November 1991, he became Russia's representative on international financial matters and between October 1992 and 1995, he was Russia's representative to the IMF. (Note: He became the Russian Federation's plenipotentiary representative to both the International Monetary Fund and the World Bank from 1990 to 1991. From January to September 1992, he was the Plenipotentiary Representative of the Government of the Russian Federation for Interaction with International Financial Organizations, Economic Advisor to the Government of the Russian Federation. From September to October 1992, he held the Russian Federation's ambassador post on the board of the International Monetary Fund.)

In November 1994, he became the deputy chairman of Bank Menatep, and was a close associate of formerly jailed oligarch Mikhail Khodorkovsky and his colleague, Platon Lebedev. In November 1995, Menatep took part in a mortgage auction, which resulted in its takeover of the oil company Yukos obtaining a 45% stake for only $159 million, which was well below Yukos market value, after $120 million had been deposited with Menatap from the government. In opposition to Menatap's bid for Yukos, Alfa-Bank of the Alfa Group tried to get financial support from Marvin Davis's Martin Oil but failed because Kagalovsky flew to Los Angeles and talked Davis out of it. Then, Alfa-Bank formed a consortium with Rossiysky Kredit and Vladimir Vinogradov's Inkombank, however, Anatoly Chubais supported Menatap and Kagalovsky so Chubais blocked the bid from Alfa-Bank's consortium due to legal issues. Subsequently, from June 1998 to June 2002, he was a member of the Board of Directors of Yukos. In 1999 he became the vice-president of Yukos. In 1996, Kagalovsky and Alfred Koch were in Barbados together.

In 1999, he, his wife Natasha Kagalovsky, an executive at the Bank of New York, and Bruce Rappaport, a major shareholder of Bank of New York were accused of money laundering, however they denied any wrongdoing, and charges were never filed.

In September 2003, he unsuccessfully ran for a position in the Duma under the party Yabloko, however Yabloko failed to overcome the five percent barrier which was required for parties to be considered. At the time, he was the second richest man to run for office in the Fourth Duma Session.

In September 2004, he headed a UK-based investor consortium that attempted to buy shares in Yukos from its former head Mikhail Khodorkovsky in order to pay off its debts. The ruling Maktoum family of Dubai, United Arab Emirates offered to pay US$10 billion to pay off Yukos' tax debts in exchange for controlling stock in the company. However, the Kremlin refused this proposal.

Today, he lives in exile in London. He and fellow Russian oligarch Vladimir Gusinsky launched a TV station TVi in Ukraine in 2008. They split due to a business dispute, and currently, Kagalovsky controls and continues to fund TVi on his own. On 24 April 2013 Oleksandr Altman was officially registered as TVi's owner but according to Kagalovsky the documents showing that he sold the station were forged.

He is known to be an associate of many Russian oligarchs, including Roman Abramovich, Eugene Shvidler, Mikhail Khodorkovsky, and the late Boris Berezovsky.

== Personal life ==
He lives in London and owns properties at New York City's Time Warner Center, Moscow, Rome and on the French Riviera.

He is married to ex-Bank of New York executive Natasha (née Gurfinkel) Kagalovsky (b. 1954, Leningrad, USSR) with whom he has a son. She has equivalent to bachelor's and master's degrees from Leningrad State University. She emigrated to the United States in 1979 and then received a master's degree in Near Eastern studies from Princeton. In 1986, she began working at Irving Bank Corp which, in 1988, was acquired by Bank of New York. She is very close to Semion Mogilevich who allegedly instructed Natasha Kagalovsky to wire transfer Cali cartel funds from Bank of New York accounts though Brazilian banks to offshore shell companies.

He is of Jewish descent.
