= TVi (TV channel) =

Former television channel in Ukraine

ТВi TVi
- The logo of TVi
- Country: Ukraine
- Broadcast area: Ukraine
- Headquarters: Kyiv, Ukraine

Programming
- Picture format: SDTV (480i 16:9); PAL (576i 16:9); UHF (Digital DVB-T2)

Ownership
- Owner: Konstantin Kagalovsky / Alexander Altman (disputed)

History
- Launched: March 17, 2008
- Closed: January 22, 2019

Links
- Website: tvi.ua

TVi (Ukrainian: ТВі) was a Ukrainian TV channel that began broadcasting in 2008; it was widely seen as Ukraine's only independent TV channel. It was known for its critical coverage of the Ukrainian government, particularly of President Viktor Yanukovych.

In late April 2013 the channel changed ownership in a disputed takeover. In early May 2013 the new management stated that they wanted to transform TVi into a mainstream TV channel (to be completed by September 2013). In March 2015 TVi stopped broadcasting because it had drained its financial resources. In March 2016 its broadcast licence was revoked.

== History ==
TVi launched on 17 March 2008, and was set up by two exiled Russian businessmenn: Vladimir Gusinsky and Konstantin Kagalovsky. They split due to a business dispute but Kagalovsky continued to fund TVi.

According to Ukrainian media watchdog Telekrytyka TVi and 5 Kanal were the only remaining TV channels in mid-May 2010 with independent and fair TV news coverage.

The President of TVi was Vitaly Portnikov.

(Former) Chairman of the Editorial Board Mykola Knyazhytsky was placed at number 10 on the electoral list of Batkivshchyna during the 2012 Ukrainian parliamentary election. He was elected into parliament and Knyazhytsky left TVi immediately after.

=== April 2013 ownership dispute ===
Oleksandr Altman was officially registered on 24 April 2013 as the channel's owner but according to Konstantin Kagalovsky, TVi's previously registered owner, the documents showing that he sold the station were forged. The staff of TVi then went on strike to protest the change of ownership that they fear will undermine their ability to air news critical of President Viktor Yanukovych. According to press reports Altman, a Ukrainian-born U.S. businessman, had in the past worked as an adviser to Energy Minister in the Second Azarov Government Eduard Stavytsky. (in April 2013) Altman stated his priority was to save the television channel as an objective source of information in Ukraine.

31 journalists resigned from TVi on 29 April 2013, they believed as TVi employees they could not anymore "guarantee our audience to provide objective and unbiased information". They (including Mustafa Nayem) set up a "web project in which we will do the same job". This "web project" eventually became Hromadske.TV.

Early May 2013 the new management stated that they wanted to transform TVi into "a full channel, similar to ICTV and Novyi Kanal (and to a lesser intend Inter and 1+1)"; this was planned to be completed by September 2013.

=== Closure ===
On 23 March 2015 TVi stopped broadcasting because of financial problems. At the time the channel vowed to return next fall TV season.

In March 2016 the channel's broadcast licence was revoked. On 10 October 2018 for two years tv channel resumed broadcast.

== Reception ==
Reception of TVi was available throughout the whole country of Ukraine. TVi was available on more than 90% of cable networks in Ukraine. Having a lot of partner agreements with regional companies TVi was available Free To Air in Kharkiv, Dnipropetrovsk, Zaporizhia, Kryvyi Rih, Mykolaiv, Simferopol, Sloviansk, Kramatorsk, and Melitopol. TVi was not granted a digital license in the summer of 2011; meaning that TVi would be shown through existing cable and satellite networks have access to about 45% of Ukraine’s population (while the selected channels will have more than 90 percent nationwide coverage) from the autumn of 2011. TVi claimed that the reason it was denied a digital license is because of its critical approach to Ukrainian President Viktor Yanukovych.

== Controversy ==
In June 2010 a video was filmed of a vehicle parked outside the TV station monitoring its activities. When the three occupants of the vehicle were asked what they were doing, they hid their faces and refused to answer questions. They then drove off, driving through a red light. TVi general director Mykola Kniazhytsky accused the SBU, Ukraine's main security agency, of carrying out this surveillance. Reporters Without Borders has condemned this as harassment.

In April 2012, TVi accused government officials of trying to disrupt and shut down the station. This was in response to tax officials allegedly probing its businesses relationships with entrepreneurs who fund the station. On April 25, 2012, tax officials delivered letters requesting contractual and other documents at the residences of at least three entrepreneurs that relate to their business dealings with TVi. Director Kniazhytsky accused the tax officials of 'bullying', and 'behaving like thugs'. In August 2012 these charges were dropped. Assessed at that time, one report noted relative to the station's independence that it has an editorial board that includes Poland's Adam Michnik and, "[c]rucially, says ... Kniazhytsky, TVi's owner has no other business interests in Ukraine."

== TVi Europe ==
On November 22, 2011, TVi Europe was launched, and it was the first Ukrainian and Polish TV channel broadcast via satellite. The channel was broadcast in Ukraine and other European countries, and its billionaire owner Konstantin Kagalovsky had reportedly invested $5 million into the new channel.

== Programming ==
Every day TVi presented two 1-hour slots of the new production documentaries from National Geographic, AETN, Discovery. TVi produces 10 hours per week of own production that correlites to nationalwide Ukrainian channels:

=== Today ===
Today (Ukrainian: Сьогодні) was a news service programme that came on the screen on week days at 8:30PM and 11:30PM.

=== The Truth ===
The Truth (Ukrainian: Правда) was a daily talk-show with famous people about events of the day. The anchors were Ukrainian’s famous journalists Roman Skrypin and Vitaly Portnikov. The program was on-air on week days at 11PM.

=== 112 Emergency ===
112 Emergency (Ukrainian: Оперативна служба 112) was a weekly show about accidents and crimes happening in Ukraine. The show came on screens on Saturdays at 8:30PM.

=== Exclamation mark ===
Exclamation mark (Ukrainian: Знак оклику) was a weekly journalistic investigation program about the most important incidents of the week. The anchor of the program was the famous journalist Artem Shevchenko. The show came on screens on Mondays at 9PM.

=== Black and white ===
Black and white (Ukrainian: Чорне та біле) was a weekly political talk show with a famous Ukrainian politician.

=== Taste of Europe ===
Taste of Europe (Ukrainian: Смак Європи) was a weekly political talk and cooking show with Paweł Kowal, a Polish politician and Member of the European Parliament. He talked with different famous Ukrainian people about democracy, European values, Ukraine's relations with Poland and integration into the European Union and NATO. The program came on screens on Saturdays at 11AM.

== See also ==
- List of Ukrainian language television channels
