= Essence of Time =

Political movement in Russia

Essence of Time Суть времени
- Leader: Sergey Kurginyan
- Founded: March 2011; 15 years ago
- Headquarters: 22nd Building, Sadovaya-Kudrinskaya Street, Moscow, Russia 123001
- Ideology: Communism; Russian nationalism; Neo-Sovietism; Soviet nationalism
- Political position: Far-left
- Religion: Orthodox Christianity
- Colours: Red

Party flag

Website
- eot.su

Essence of Time (Russian: Суть времени, romanized: Sut' vremeni) is a Russian nationalist political movement founded and led by political scientist, philosopher, and theater director Sergei Kurginyan.

== Principles ==
A flag used by Essence of Time volunteers in the Russo-Ukrainian War

The movement's ideology is a mixture of communism with Russian patriotic elements. Its principles are explained in The manifesto of the movement "Essence of Time". The manifesto states that the dissolution of the Soviet Union was a tragedy and that the objective of the movement is to restore the USSR in a better and more capable form.

According to Kurginyan, capitalism is inherently incompatible with Russian historical and cultural heritage. Kurginyan states that, since the fall of the USSR in 1991 "capitalism in Russia has not built anything, and destroyed everything", but that after 20 years Russia is starting to "wake up".

The movement is grounded in modern philosophy and incorporates the ideas of Karl Marx, Max Weber, Erich Fromm, Antonio Gramsci, Alexander Bogdanov, Viktor Frankl, and others. One of the main principles of the movement's ideology is the ascription of great importance to the human spirit as a philosophical category, which is considered to be linked directly to the question of the ascent of humanity. The project subscribes to the conception of uber-modernity (in Russian сверхмодерн, tr. sverkhmodern), not to be confused with post-modernity, and on this principle hopes to build a new historical project for Russia. The project conceives a role for Russia in moving the world out of the global crisis of capitalism, based on the country's experience of alternatives to capitalist modernity and so-called post-modernity.

The movement seeks to unite people with socialist and communist political views as well as those with Russian nationalist and Orthodox Christian values, with the objective of creating a spiritual synthesis. One of the main aims of the movement is a revival of the Soviet Union on new principles, taking into account the mistakes of the past (the project is thus dubbed USSR 2.0). The movement envisions a new union state consisting of equal nations where the Russian nation plays the role of the state's core. The stated ultimate goal of the movement is to bring to life the best of communism's ideas, a state of being in society which provides for the awakening and development of the higher creative abilities of every human being.

== History of the movement ==
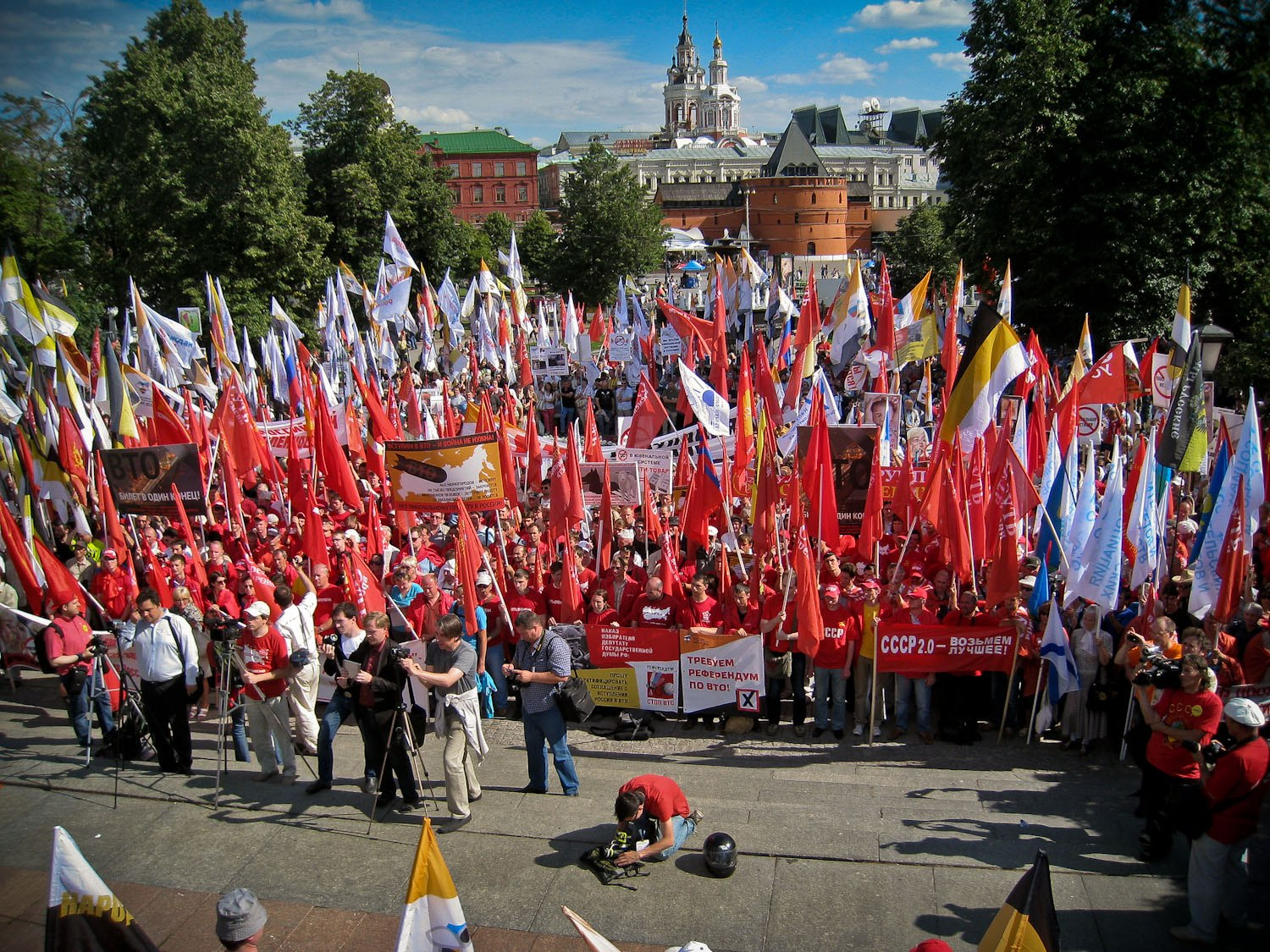
Coalition protest of the "patriotic opposition", blending nationalist and communist symbolism, 1 July 2012

On 19 July 2010, the show "Court of Time" began broadcasting nationally on Russian television's Fifth Channel. The subject of the show was a serious discussion of historical events and personalities in the form of the hearing. The main participants were Leonid Mlechin and Sergei Kurginyan. The show gained certain measure of public acclaim, in part because of the subject matter, but also because the studio audience and internet and telephone voters were asked to vote whose side they agreed with. While the small studio audience was often won over by Mlechin, who adheres to liberal political and economic values, online and telephone voters always decisively sided with Sergei Kurginyan (ranging from a minimum of 72% to 97%), who consistently defended the pro-Soviet stance. The last broadcast of this show was held on 30 December 2010.

After the conclusion of "Court of Time", Sergei Kurginyan began his own web show entitled "Essence of Time", which in lecture format, outlined his views on the causes of the Soviet Union's collapse, the prospects for the political, socioeconomic and cultural development of Russia, and the political situation in the world and its relation to the previous two questions. Kurginyan noted that he conceived of the program as an opportunity to continue the discussion, started in the program "Court of Time", but now among a circle of friends. On the basis of this web show, the virtual club "Essence of Time" was soon created, quickly gathering enthusiasts and building local sections of the club.

Commenting on the party's and Kurginyan's ideology, the Russian Labour Front stated that:

Before us is a sincere Soviet patriot, standing on anti-Marxist, and consequently, anti-scientific theoretical positions. And these false theoretical positions largely nullify all his efforts in defending the Soviet past and, in a sense, play against the cause for which he is fighting.

The movement has a unit fighting on the pro-Russian side in the war in Donbas.

== Participation in the anti-Orange meeting on Poklonnaya Hill ==
External videos
- Video report on the meeting on February 4 on website of the movement "Essence of Time"

Together with supporters of the current government, "Essence of Time" became one of the main organizers of the anti-Orange revolutionary meeting on Poklonnaya Hill on 4 February 2012. On the eve of the meeting, activists with flags and symbology of the movement participated in pickets near Moscow subway stations, handing out leaflets, talking about the movement's activities and calling on citizens to take part in the meeting. According to the MOI Moscow, the meeting was attended by about 140,000 people. The penalty for exceeding the number of participants in the meeting was paid for by Vladimir Putin.

== Books ==
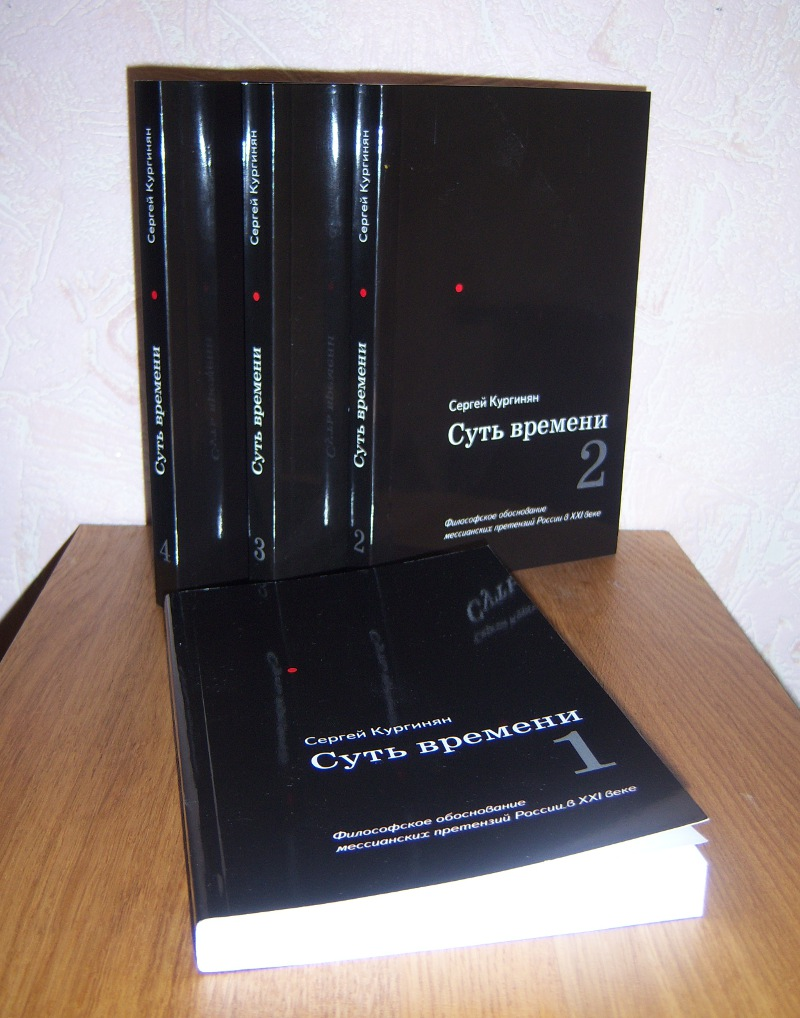
Copies of Essence of Time: Philosophical justification of messianic claims of Russia in the 21st century

In May 2012, Kurginyan published the book Essence of Time: Philosophical justification of messianic claims of Russia in the 21st century. Consisting of four volumes, the book consists of the texts of the online web show "Essence of Time" and the explanatory diagrams that go along with them.

== See also ==
- National communism
- National Bolshevism
- Syncretic politics
