= Artem Shevchenko =

Ukrainian journalist (born 1977)

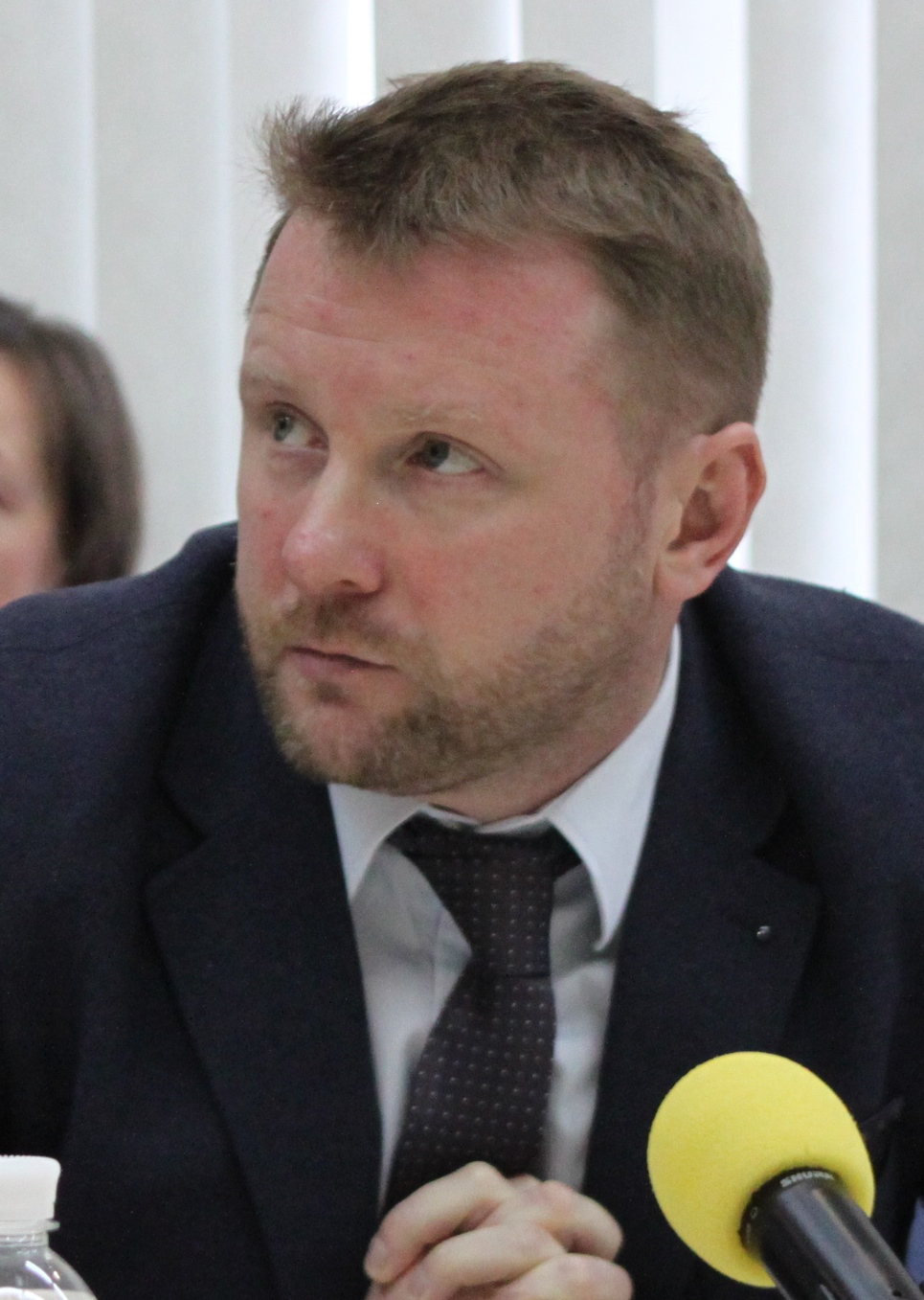
Artem Shevchenko

Artem Valeriiovych Shevchenko (Ukrainian: Артем Валерійович Шевченко; born 30 October 1977) is a Ukrainian TV journalist and manager, and is also the CEO of TVi channel.

== Biography ==
=== Early years and education ===
Artem Shevchenko was born on 30 October 1977 in Dnipropetrovsk (now Dnipro).

He worked in TV from high school. After three courses at the Faculty of Media and Communications of Dnipropetrovsk National University he transferred to the Institute of Journalism of Taras Shevchenko National University of Kyiv.

=== Career ===
Artem Shevchenko worked as a journalist on the STB, ICTV, 1+1, Tonis and Inter channels. He was a presenter of television programs "Exclamation mark", "Exclamation mark: Daily" and "Special format" on TVi.

As a journalist, he has experience working as a reporter in covering military conflicts. He won an Award of the National Council for Television and Radio Broadcasting "TV-Triumph" in the category "Best Reporter" (2001).

In 2015, Shevchenko was appointed spokesperson of the Ministry of Internal Affairs of Ukraine. He resigned from the position in January 2022.

== See also ==
- TVi (channel)
