= Alexander Smolensky =

Russian businessman (1954–2024)

- Александр Смоленский
- Born: Alexander Pavlovich Smolensky; 6 July 1954; Moscow, Russian SFSR, USSR
- Died: 13 October 2024 (aged 70); Tel Aviv, Israel
- Spouse: Galina Smolenskaya (Marchenko)
- Children: Nikolay (born 1980)

Alexander Pavlovich Smolensky (Russian: Алекса́ндр Па́влович Смолéнский; 6 July 1954 – 13 October 2024) was a Russian business oligarch.

== Biography ==
Alexander Smolensky began his business activities on the black market of the so-called "shadow economy". His private ventures included trading foreign currency, moonlighting on a second job in a bakery with a counterfeit permit as well as typesetting and printing Bibles using government presses and ink. He was arrested by the KGB in 1981 and charged with economic crimes. Subsequently, he was sentenced to two years of hard labour although he only served one day.

Alexander Smolensky is considered the first private banker of Russia. Alexander Smolensky was the founder and president of one of the largest private banks in Russia - Bank Stolichny. In 1992, he set up the country's first debit card processing system. In 1998 he merged his agribusiness assets in Agroprombank (acquired in 1996), which was renamed SBS-Agro and gave the businessman a tremendous influence at the Kremlin. SBS-Agro collapsed in the 1998 Russian financial crisis wiping out its investors' savings. When asked what he owed his investors he replied: "dead donkey ears". He also declared that his banking activities had not gone bankrupt, but solely split into several structures spread throughout the country and managed by an advanced computer system. In 1999 Russian prosecutors issued a warrant for his arrest including charges of embezzlement and money laundering. This warrant, however, was later dropped.

Smolensky's net worth in 2003 was estimated to be 230 million USD. By 2003 he renamed his group OVK Bank, turned it over to his son Nikolay, who sold it to Vladimir Potanin two months later. In 2004 his son Nikolay Smolensky purchased the sportscar maker TVR. (The company went bankrupt in 2007.)

In the period from 2006 to 2011, the former oligarch became interested in literary work and published seven books in the political thriller genre. The opuses were based on real stories from the life of the Russian elite.

After 2011, Smolensky disappeared from the public eye.

In 2019 a company associated with Smolensky sold the last four office complexes in Moscow, including the famous Alexander House, the former headquarters of Vladimir Putin. The deal was valued at over €60 million.

Smolensky died on 13 October 2024, at the age of 70.

== See also ==
- Semibankirschina

== Books ==
- David E. Hoffman. The Oligarchs: Wealth and Power in the New Russia, Public Affairs (2003) ISBN 1-58648-202-5
