= Vitaly Malkin =

Russian politician and businessman (born 1952)

- Виталий Малкин
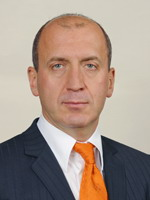
- Born: 16 September 1952 (age 74); Pervouralsk, Russia, Soviet Union
- Occupations: Businessman, politician

Vitaly Borisovich Malkin (Russian: Виталий Борисович Малкин; born 16 September 1952) is a Russian-Israeli business oligarch and politician who was born in Pervouralsk near Yekaterinburg, the administrative center of Sverdlovsk Oblast. He is married and has three children. His fortune is estimated by Forbes to be $1 billion.

== Career ==
Malkin built his fortune in the banking sector, notably with his business partner Bidzina Ivanishvili. The two men founded Rossiysky Kredit, which was the third largest Russian bank until the 1998 Russian financial crisis. He officially retired from business in 2004, when he became a member of Federation Council, representing the east Siberian republic of Buryatia (from 2004 to 2013). In 2012, he headed a delegation of four Russian senators in Washington lobbying against the Magnitsky Act. Vitaly Malkin and his colleagues tried to convince American senators that Sergei Magnitsky was a criminal and that he died from pancreatitis.

== Controversy ==
According to the National Post (Canada), Malkin was denied entry to Canada in May 2009. The Canadian government has accused him of involvement in alleged money laundering and international arms deals.

In 2013, Russian anti-corruption activist Alexei Navalny published documents on his blog, showing that Malkin has failed to declare ownership of 111 condominiums in Canada and that he has an Israeli passport. In March 2013, Malkin resigned from Federation Council over the dual nationality issue.
