= Vladimir Vinogradov =

Russian businessman (1955–2008)

- Владимир Виноградов
- Born: 19 September 1955; Ufa, Russian SFSR, Soviet Union
- Died: 29 June 2008 (aged 52); Moscow, Russia

Vladimir Viktorovich Vinogradov (Russian Владимир Викторович Виноградов; 19 September 1955 — 29 June 2008) was the owner and president of Inkombank, one of the largest banks in 90s' Russia. Considered one of Russia's oligarchs, he was ranked 12th in the list of the top 20 richest Russians in 1996. His bank underwent bankruptcy following the 1998 Russian financial crisis.

== Early life ==
Vladimir Viktorovich Vinogradov was born in 1955 in Ufa, Bashkiria. He lost his father when he was a child, and grew up in modest circumstances. He graduated from the Moscow Aviation Institute with a degree in mechanical engineering. From 1979 until 1985 he worked at the Atommash factory in Volgodonsk as a construction engineer. He took a leading role in the Komsomol, the Communist Youth organisation, and was given the opportunity to continue his studies at the Plekhanov Russian Academy of Economics, becoming the Promstroybank's chief economist in 1988.

== Career ==
In October 1988, he founded one of Russia's first wholly private commercial bank, Inkombank, also called the Moscow Innovative Commercial Bank, which eventually became Russia's largest private bank. Vinogradov joined Boris Yeltsin’s business advisory council, being one of the so called “seven bankers”, the financial group around Yeltsin. In 1997 he was the vice president of the Association of Russian Bankers.

Both Menatep and Inkombank are believed to have had business relationships with Bruce Rappaport.

In April 1992 Vinogradov declared his support for Moscow's Mayor Yuri Luzhkov and the city government, defending them from accusations of corruption. The declaration was endorsed by other figures on the financial scene, including Vladimir Gusinsky, Leonid Nevzlin and Mikhail Khodorkovsky, who formed an influential economic group known as PPI, which Vinogradov led from 1993. Although one of Yeltsin's supporters in the years after the October 1993 crisis and an adviser to the Economics Ministry, Vinogradov criticised the government in 1995 of following too rigid an economic policy and said that the conflict in Chechnya was damaging the economy.

From 1992, Edmond Safra's Bank of New York held Inkombank's correspondent bank accounts and, according to Natasha Gurfinkel Kagalovsky, a banker with the London office of the Bank of New York who held a power of attorney or a "general mandate" for Inkombank through March 1998 which was signed by Vladimir Vinogradov who was the chairman of Inkombank when the general mandate was established, Inkombank was the "largest and most active commercial relationship" with the Bank of New York in a letter on 23 April 1996.

Igor Komarov worked at Inkombank in the 1990s.

According to Giovanni de Gennaro who was the Deputy Director of the Italian National Police, Boris Yakubovich (Russian: Борис Якубович), an Inkombank banker, was killed in July 1993 so that the Italian mafia could gain a stake in the Inkombank branch in St. Petersburg.

Boris Kuznetsov claimed that on 18 June 1993 the American investment funds established in the Cayman Islands "Oriental XL Funds", "Morgenthow & Latham", and the "New York International Insurance Group" gained a collective 30% stake in Inkombank by purchasing 7000 shares for $14 million, 7000 shares for $14 million and 6000 shares for $12 million, respectively, and were shown owning their stakes in Inkombank's 1993 annual report; however, he claimed that their stake had not received dividends and subsequently was not even listed as owning their stakes in later anuual audits.

In 1994 with approval from both Boris Nemtsov and Anatoly Chubais, Natasha Gurfinkel Kagalovsky illegally sent $2 million from Bank of New York (BONY) accounts to accounts of the bankrupt Investment Commercial Bank (ICB) "Nizhegorodets" (Russian: инвестиционно-коммерческого банка (ИКБ) "Нижегородец"), which momentarily was saved from insolvency, requiring Viktor Zaburdyaev (Russian: Виктор Забурдяев), director of "Nizhpoligraf" (Russian: "Нижполиграф"), to return the money to BONY by taking a loan from Inkombank illegally using the state owned "Nizhpoligraf" building as security. In return for taking the loan from Inkombank, Zaburdyaev's company became a shareholder in Nizhegorodskaya Yarmarka JSC (Russian: АО "Нижегородская ярмарка"). Anatoly Chubais was in charge of the deal along with Vladimir Panskov, the Russian Minister of Finance, signing documents and the Russian Central Bank's chairperson Tatyana Paramonova providing oversight. When Inkombank's loan was to be repaid, the leaders of the Nizhny Novgorod Oblast had changed.

In May 1996 Inkombank, with reportedly $4 billion in assets, raised $20 million in Russia's first unsecured syndicated loan from Western banks. In November 1996 Vinogradov won a libel suit against the newspaper Kommersant and Russian TV controlled by Boris Berezovsky, who had spread rumors that Inkombank couldn't pay its interbank borrowings, and that a Central Bank inspection report implied that the bank was near collapse, a claim denied by the Central Bank. In December 1996 Vinogradov established the first American depositary receipt for a Russian bank in the US stock market, being one of the few Russian banks that adhered to US accounting standards. In February 1997 he reportedly predicted that 1,000 banks in Russia, about half the total, were going to disappear within the next five years, most of them going bankrupt.

According to CBS Money Watch, Vinogradov had a reputation for openness and fair dealing as well as for making impulsive and politically unwise statements. He had some important international connections, such as London's Rothschild Bank, and US consulting firm McKinsey, which had devised a business plan for him. Inkombank also had an industrial portfolio that included a minority stake in jet-fighter maker Sukhoi and control of aluminum fabricator Samara Metallurgical. In 1995 Vinogradov acquired the Babayev chocolate factory, in Russia's first hostile stock market takeover, a deal praised for its transparency and fairness: Even after he had gained 50 per cent of the shares, he offered the same terms to minority shareholders. On the other hand, Inkombank was accused of having been infiltrated by Russian organized crime figures tied to Semion Mogilevich in 1994.

In May 1998 Chase Manhattan Corp. arranged its first commercial paper program for a Russian bank with a $50 million program for Inkombank, reported to have $5.1 billion of assets. In summer 1998, during the Russian financial crisis, when the government defaulted, the bank suffered huge losses because it had large investments in GKOs according to Yury Skuratov, and was granted $100 million in credit by the Russian Central Bank, but only survived temporarily. Vinogradov resigned, and two days later, on 29 October 1998, the Russian Central Bank revoked the bank's licence, explaining that “Inkombank had taken excessive risks ahead of the August 17 devaluation and that its obligations had shrunk its asset base.” The bank was declared bankrupt on 1 February 2000.

There were accusations that the management had illegally transferred funds from the bank to subsidiaries outside of Russia. According to Vladimir Dudkin (Russian: Владимир Дудкин), vice president of Inkombank, money from both loans from the European Bank for Reconstruction and Development and foreign aid that were stolen from both the accounts at Inkombank and its correspondent accounts at Bank of New York were transferred through Hoverwood Ltd. to the West and to accounts with Alfa-Bank, Kredobank (Russian: Кредобанк) and Rossiyskiy Kredit Bank (Russian: банк «Российский кредит») but were merely called Pension Funds at Inkombank. To support the theft, Natasha Kagalovsky (née Gurfinkel) forged Bank of New York and Inkombank documents which were backdated with faked contracts.

Beginning in the early 1990s, the KGB and later the FSB along with Georgian authorities discovered numerous ties with Georgian narcotics traffickers, Georgian mafia, and Inkombank. Allegedly, Georgian mafia was transiting narcotics through Poti, Georgia to Western Europe, Eastern Europe, and Russia using raw cotton deliveries as their cover which Inkombank was financing and Western authorities were supporting the Georgian Ministry of Security in efforts to stop the illicit activities. Under the United States Federal RICO law, authorities and Inkombank shareholders alleged that Arthur Howard Christy (b. 1924 or 1925), Inkombank's United States attorney, along with Peter Gallagher and Wayne Matus were obstructing justice. (Note: After passing the New York bar examination in 1989, Emanuel Zeltser, born in Kishinev, Moldovan SSR, USSR and emigrated to the United States in 1974, had been Inkombank's United States attorney from 1992 until 1993 after which he established the American Russian Law Institute.) An official with Smith Barney, who is a senior vice president, testified that Vinogradov would have his throat slit.

A key prospective witness in Inkombank's affairs was Lyubov Tarasova (Russian: Любовь Тарасова) who was a senior auditor for the Central Bank of Russia and worked for the "Unicom" (Russian: "Юникон") auditing firm which had been established on 20 August 1991 and was responsible for "checking the correctness of the documentation and the essence of business transactions that are in doubt" (Russian: "проверка правильности документального оформления и сущности хозяйственных операций, вызывающих сомнение"), but was stabbed to death in her apartment in Moscow on 15–16 October 1997.

On 17 September 1999, United States Congress held hearings into alleged illegal activity associated with Vinogradov and Inkombank.

In 2005, the lawsuit of Morgenthow & Latham vs. the Bank of Cyprus indicated that Inkombank had used the Bank of Cyprus accounts and accounts at other banks for money laundering over $1 billion.

== Personal life ==
Vinogradov had two daughters and one son with his wife Liudmila. He died of a stroke after a long illness in Moscow on June 29, 2008, aged 52.

== Books ==
- Скуратов, Юрий Ильич (Skuratov, Yury Ilyich) (2013). Кремлёвские подряды: Последнее дело прокурора [Kremlin contracts. The last case of the Attorney General] (in Russian). Moscow: ООО «Издательство Алгоритм» (Algorithm Publishing House). ISBN 978-5-4438-0301-2.
