= Rossiysky Kredit =

Defunct Russian bank

- Trade name: OJSC Bank Rossiysky Kredit
- Company type: Open joint-stock company (OJSC)
- Industry: Financial services
- Founded: 1991
- Founder: Bidzina Ivanishvili
- Defunct: July 24, 2015
- Fate: License revoked after financial failure
- Headquarters: Moscow, Russia
- Area served: Russia
- Key people: Bidzina Ivanishvili, Vitaly Malkin
- Products: Banking services
- Website: www.roscredit.ru

Rossiysky Kredit (Roscredit) (Russian: Российский кредит или «Роскредит») was a Russian commercial bank that ceased operations on 24 July 2015, when the Central Bank of Russia withdrew the bank's license.

== History ==
Rossiysky Kredit was established as a mutual bank in 1991 by ex-Prime Minister of Georgia, billionaire Bidzina Ivanishvili and his partner, former Russian Federation Council member Vitaly Malkin. (Note: From 1993 to 2015, the Morozov house at Smolensky Boulevard, 26/9, building 1 was the location of the Rossiysky Kredit Bank, Russian Credit Bank or Roscredit (Russian: банк «Российский кредит» или «Роскредит») and after Roscredit's license was revoked by the Central Bank of Russia on 24 July 2015, the Office of the Presidential Affairs managed the Morozov house. In 2017, the building became the new location of the Russian Institute for Strategic Studies (RISS or RISI or RISY) (Russian: Российский институт стратегических исследований (РИСИ))).) By 1996, it was the seventh largest bank in Russia, as measured by assets. In 1997 it was converted into a joint stock company.

Because of the 1998 Russian financial crisis, Rossiysky Kredit became insolvent and lost much of its deposits. Before 1999, Vasily Anisimov was on its board of directors. In 1999 the bank came under the control of the Agency for Restructuring Credit Organizations (ARKO, the predecessor of the Deposit Insurance Agency of Russia). In 2003 Rossiysky Kredit emerged from restructuring and passed out of ARKO control. In 2011, Rossiysky Kredit became part of the Russian bank deposit insurance system. In 2012, Bidzina Ivanishvili sold 99.61% of shares in the bank to a group of investors headed by Anatoly Motylev.

Examinations carried out on the eve of the Central Bank's license revocation found that the bank's funds were applied in the interests of owners and related companies, and that more than half of the loan portfolio consisted of doubtful debts. The State's costs arising from the bank failure was estimated at 57 Billion Rubles, making it the fifth most costly Russian bank default.

In 2020, Anatoly Motylev was declared bankrupt in London and in 2022 in Switzerland. Thus, Russian creditors received hope to get to his assets. In total, Motylev owes about 40 billion rubles, 35 of them to Rossiysky Kredit.
