= Vladimir Gusinsky =

Russian media tycoon (born 1952)

- Владимир Гусинский
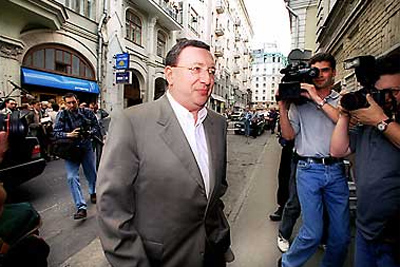
- Gusinsky in 2005
- Born: 6 October 1952 (age 74); Moscow, Russian SFSR, Soviet Union
- Occupation: Media executive
- Known for: Founder of Media-Most

Vladimir Aleksandrovich Gusinsky (Russian: Влади́мир Алекса́ндрович Гуси́нский, [vlɐˈdʲimʲɪr ɐlʲɪkˈsandrəvʲɪdʑ ɡʊˈsʲinskʲɪj]; born 6 October 1952) is an Israeli-Russian media tycoon. He founded the Media-Most holding company that included the NTV free-to-air channel, the newspaper Sevodnya, and a number of magazines.

== Early life and education ==
Gusinsky was born into a Jewish family in Moscow on 6 October 1952. In 1969, Gusinsky enrolled in Gubkin Institute of Oil and Gas, however, he did not finish his education there. He joined the USSR Army in 1973 as a Junior Sergeant in the Chemical Intelligence Troops. In 1975, after being demobilized, Gusinsky enrolled in the State Institute for the Study of Theatrical Arts (Russian: ГИТИС English: GITIS). He graduated in 1979 with his graduating diploma work on the staging of "Tartuffe" by Molière, in the Tula State Dramatic Theater.

== Early career ==
1986

- Stage Director for the Ted Turner Goodwill Games in the Kremlin Palace.
- Founded one of the first cooperatives following Perestroika - Cooperative "Metal" - which started to produce metal garages and later copper bracelets and other fashion jewelry in mass quantities.

1988

- Founded the cooperative "INFEKS" under the auspices of the Ministry of Foreign Trade of the USSR, which engaged in consulting of foreign companies entering into the Russian market.

1989

- Created the joint venture "Most", together with APCO (a consulting company owned by the Arnold & Porter Law Firm in Washington DC).
- Gusinsky established "Most Bank", one of the first and one of the largest private retail banks in Russia. The first ATM allowing cash withdrawals in Russia was installed by Most Bank in Russia in 1994.

1992

- Founded a holding company "Most Group". All of Gusinsky's business assets, totaling 42 companies, including Most Bank (Russian: Мост-банк) and a number of construction companies, were integrated into this holding structure.

== Involvement in media ==
1993:

- Gusinsky, together with a number of leading journalists, established Sevodnya, a daily political newspaper.
- In the end of 1993, Gusinsky, together with several leading TV journalists and media experts – such as Igor Malashenko, Evgeni Kiselev and Oleg Dobrodeev – founded the first private television channel in Russia: NTV. NTV's main focus was independent and uncensored news and unbiased political shows, and their slogan was "News Is Our Profession".

1994:

- The First Chechen War started in 1994. NTV provided pro-Chechen coverage of the war and was often critical of the Russian government.
- In December 1994, the President's Secret Service was ordered to attack Gusinsky's offices. As a result, Gusinsky and his family had to leave Russia. Gusinsky was able to return in May 1995, while during his absence NTV and all his other media assets continued their independent editorial policy and coverage of the war.

1996:

- Gusinsky was one of the founders of the Russian Jewish Congress, and in January 1996 was elected its president.
- In February 1996, in Davos, during the World Economic Forum, together with Boris Berezovsky, he organized a meeting of Russia's most prominent businessmen. The group met to decide how to support the Presidential bid of Yeltsin and to prevent the communists from returning to power. Further, the group contacted Anatoli Chubais, the creator and advocate of Privatization, and convinced him to lead and manage Yeltsin's presidential campaign.
- The elections for the President of Russian Federation took place in June 1996 (first round). President Yeltsin was elected in the second round of the election (July 1996). Many international and domestic observers considered these to be the first elections in Russia to approach the western democratic standards.

=== Consolidation and development of media assets ===
1996:

- Gazprom, the state owned natural gas giant, became a 30% shareholder of NTV.
- A US based media investor Capital Group became a 5% shareholder in NTV and 5% shareholder in TNT - a regional network.

1997:

- "Most Group" consolidated all its media assets in a new entity - "Media Most". Gusinsky resigned from his positions in "Most Group" and "Most Bank", became president of "Media Most", and focused all his efforts on the development of the media business.
- The new media holding company included NTV, TNT, NTV Plus, Echo Moscow, Publishing house Seven Days, other radio stations, internet development companies, movie studios and media design companies.
- "Media Most" was the largest media holding in Russia and, based on the number of viewers and readers, and possibly one of the largest in Europe. Gusinsky was hailed as the "Rupert Murdoch" of Russia.
- While Gusinsky never participated in privatization – all his assets were created from scratch, in 1997, Gusinsky made his first, and last, attempt at privatization – he bid for the privatizing of the state owned telecommunication giant Svyazinvest. The bid ended unsuccessfully for Gusinsky, and many commentators have accused Gusinsky of using his media assets to influence his bid and it resulted in a large public scandal.
- In mid-1997, a banking consortium led by Credit Suisse First Boston was preparing NTV for a public offering on NASDAQ at a valuation in 1.2 - 1.4 billion US Dollars, with a large portion of the proceeds from the IPO to be used for development of the business.

1998:

- The 1997 Asian Economic Crisis severely impacted the Russian economy in 1998. This led to Russia defaulting on its domestic debts and declaring a moratorium on payments to foreign creditors in August 1998. The financial default put a stop to the NTV's attempted IPO.
- Subsequently, in order to continue "Media Most" development and in anticipation of an economic rebound following Russia's default, "Media Most" received a credit from Credit Suisse First Boston, guaranteed by Gazprom. The money was invested in "Media Most" business development.
- In November 1998, "Media Most" satellite, Bonum 1, built by US Hughes Communications was launched from Cape Canaveral, Florida, USA. This was the first private commercial satellite in Russia, and for the first time a US built and launched satellite was controlled from the territory of Russia. The satellite provided DTH (Direct to Home) satellite delivery services for "Media Most" NTV Plus.

=== Confrontation with Kremlin ===
1999

- An alliance that included President Yeltsin, Yeltsin's relatives, and a group of powerful businessmen, publicly known as the "Family", brought in Vladimir Putin as the successor to President Yeltsin. At the same time, Gusinsky positioned himself outside of the "Family" and as a result he was accused of supporting the election of anti-Kremlin alliance of Primakov & Luzhkov. This was the beginning of the conflict between Gusinsky, the Family, and Putin.
- In September 1999, there were a number of terrorist attacks in Moscow and other cities in Russia. Several buildings were bombed and many people were killed. The Kremlin took the position that Chechen separatists were responsible for the bombings. Around the same time, a group of neighbors residing in an apartment building found a large quantity of explosives in the basement of their building, and reported it to FSB. At that time a group of independent journalist investigators exposed certain facts that connected the explosives with individuals connected with FSB. Gusinsky's NTV decided to take an independent stance and launched an in-depth public journalistic investigation – investigating the possibility that FSB was staging explosions in an effort to influence the upcoming elections. Gusinsky was given an ultimatum to remove this "independent investigation" from NTV, or else face the consequences. Gusinsky refused to end the investigation. Furthermore, a number of independent commentators accused the Kremlin and Putin of organizing the explosions, prompting the new Chechen war, with the goal of increasing Putin's popularity in anticipation of elections. This was the breaking point in the relationship between Gusinsky and the Kremlin, the Family, and Yeltsin's successor Putin.
- On 31 December 1999, President Yeltsin resigned, and Vladimir Putin became the acting president of Russia.

2000

- In January, Gusinsky was elected as the vice president of the World Jewish Congress.
- With the Yeltsin's resignation bringing Putin to Acting Presidency, and the subsequent election in May 2000 that brought Putin to power, one of the first publicly criticized acts of new president Putin was the commencement of an investigation against Gusinsky with the goal of putting NTV under government control and effectively silencing the opposition.
- In June, the Prosecutor General office launched an investigation against Gusinsky for misappropriation of funds in connection with a company "Russian Video". On 13 June, he was arrested in Moscow and incarcerated into the infamous Butyrka Prison.
- Shortly after his arrest, representatives of the Kremlin proposed to Gusinsky to sell "Media Most" to Gazprom-Media at a price that Gazprom-Media sets, 300 million US Dollars, in return for his freedom. Subsequently, this became known as "shares for freedom" transaction or Protocol No. 6 (Протокол N.6. Доля свободы) that was signed by acting Minister Lesin in his capacity as head of the Ministry of Press, Broadcasting and Mass Communications of the Russian Federation. (Note: Lesin had Gusinsky sign a statement that Gusinsky would "отказ от всех шагов, включая публичные заявления или распространение информации организациями, акционеров и руководителей, которые повредили бы основы конституционного строя и нарушение целостности Российской Федерации, подрыв безопасности государства, разжигание социальной, расовой, национальной или религиозной розни или привести к дискредитации государственных учреждений Российской Федерации. [renunciation of all steps, including public statements or dissemination of information by the organizations, shareholders, and executives, which would damage the foundations of the constitutional regime and violate the integrity of the Russian Federation, undermine the security of the State, incite social, racial, national, or religious discord or lead to the discrediting of the State institutions of the Russian Federation].")
- A public scandal ensued, and the day after Gusinsky's arrest on 14 June, US President Clinton was asked at a press conference about his thoughts on Gusinsky's arrest. Clinton replied that he did not think that people should be arrested for criticism of Kremlin. Moreover, Putin, who was visiting Spain at the time of the arrest, had to answer questions in its connection. One of Putin's answers was – "I do not know anything about it, and cannot get in touch with the Prosecutor General of Russia." (Note: Vladimir Ustinov was the Prosecutor General of Russia.)
- After three days and much public pressure, scandal, and speculation, Gusinsky was released from prison and placed under house arrest on 16 June. Several weeks later, in July, he signed an agreement selling all his media assets for 300 million US Dollars. The criminal investigation was closed, and Gusinsky immediately left Russia. From that time Gusinsky never returned to Russia. On his last drive to the Moscow airport, he was accompanied by Boris Nemtsov, an opposition leader who was assassinated in February 2015 near Kremlin.
- Outside of Russia, Gusinsky repudiated the deal as being executed under duress.
- Shortly after Gusinsky left Russia, CEO of Gazprom Media Alfred Koch, asked the Russian Prosecutor General to launch a new investigation against Gusinsky and Media Most, alleging improper use of Gazprom's guarantees to attract credits (at that time Gazprom was a shareholder of 12.5% of Media Most and 30% of NTV). The Prosecutor General's Office asked Interpol's head office in Lyon, France, to issue an international arrest warrant for Gusinsky's detention and extradition. Interpol's head office declined the Russian request, asking to clarify the reason to make sure it did not violate Interpol Charter, that forbids intervention based on political character. Eventually, Interpol firmly refused to issue any warrant of arrest for Gusinsky, and when Russian authorities appealed the refusal the Interpol headquarters firmly upheld their refusal.
- On 17 November, Media Most signed a settlement agreement for Gazprom's guarantees and for current and future obligations (that were maturing in 2001). Immediately after signing the settlement agreement, Gazprom Media's Alfred Koch wrote to the Prosecutor General letting him know that the settlement agreement was successfully executed and thanking him for his assistance. Even with this settlement agreement being signed by Gusinsky under a threat of arrest and extradition, Gazprom conceded that Media Most's assets were fairly valued in excess of 1.1 billion USD.
- However, ignoring the settlement agreement, and ignoring the Interpol head office's refusal to issue the international arrest warrant (due to suspected political motivations for arrest), the Russian local branch of Interpol circumvented the head office's refusal, went directly to the Spanish local branch of Interpol and requested it to detain and extradite Gusinsky.
- On 12 December, Gusinsky was arrested in Spain based on the Russian request. The arrest warrant was issued by Justice Balthazar Garzon.
- On 22 December, Justice Balthazar Garzon released Gusinsky from prison and places him under house arrest in Gusinsky's home in southern Spain. The decision to release Gusinsky was strongly criticized in Spain, and was appealed by prosecution, as it is uncommon for a foreigner facing extradition to be released and placed under house arrest.

=== Legal confrontation with Kremlin, and later life ===
2001

- In January, Gusinsky filed a case against Russia in the European Court of Human Rights for violations of his rights and freedoms.
- In April, the National Court of Spain rejected the Russian Federation's request for Gusinsky's extradition. The Spanish court noted that the charges against Gusinsky were politically motivated and in fact did not even constitute a crime – the National Court specifically stated "It is possible to observe in the documents furnished by [the applicant]... "certain noteworthy and peculiar circumstances which are unusual in the sphere of judicial claims for fraud and which, although they do not in themselves lead to the conclusion that we are dealing with an irregular claim filed for a political purpose, compel the Court to consider [the applicant's] argument as not completely without foundation as far as the facts and interferences are concerned and as not inconceivable or discountable on the basis of logical criteria and experience." Gusinsky was released.
- In mid April, the Russian Federation conducted raids on the offices of Media Most and NTV.
- Only days after the National Court of Spain decided that charges against Gusinsky were politically motivated and not a crime, the Russian Federation commenced new criminal proceedings against Gusinsky and issued a new arrest warrant, alleging money laundering of money owed to Gazprom. Again the Russian Federation submitted the request to arrest Gusinsky in his home in Spain, but Gusinsky was not present – he left for Israel. Several months later the National Court of Spain dismissed the Russian Federation's new request as baseless.
- In July, the supervisory board of Interpol recommended to stop any further actions against Gusinsky based on Russian Federation requests. Interpol's secretary general, Ronald Noble, described the case against Gusinsky as having "predominantly political character". In August, Israel refused to extradite Gusinsky to Russia.

2002

- In May, Gusinsky started a new television project – RTV International or RTVi, that continued what NTV International started – providing unbiased Russian language news for Russian speakers worldwide.
- In October, Gusinsky's internet news project Newsru.com, started operating on its new domain name. Prior to this, the project was operating as NTV.ru, but that domain name was given to Gazprom Media, the new owners of NTV. The design for the website was created by an internationally recognized designer: Semyon Levin. Newsru.com included a highly acclaimed internet resource – Inopressa.ru – that provided summaries of daily news from foreign print media translated into the Russian language. Currently, the Newsru.com website has more than 65 million page views and 7.5 million unique visitors monthly.

2003

- In August, Gusinsky was arrested in Greece on another request for extradition from the Russian Federation. Several days later he was released on bail and awaited the decision while under pledge not to depart Athens.
- In September, while awaiting the Greek court's decision about his extradition, Gusinsky's hotel room was burglarized while he was out to dinner. It was claimed to be a professional job, but police declined to comment on the extent of the items that were taken.
- In October, after the Athens Court of Appeals examined the charges brought against Gusinsky by the Russian Federation, it refused the extradition request. The Court of Appeals held that the charges alleged against Gusinsky were not unlawful under Greek law.

2004

- In May 2004, the European Court of Human Rights held that the arrest and criminal charges against Gusinsky were in violation of Article 5 and Article 18 of the Convention on Protection of Human Rights and Basic Freedoms, stating that the facts of the case established that the prosecution of Gusinsky in Russia was politically motivated and used to intimidate him. The Russian Federation appealed. In November, the European Court of Human Rights declined Russian Federation's request to review its decision, thereby upholding its ruling.

2005

- Gusinsky consolidated his television production operations into a new holding company named New Media Distribution Company. The company became one of the largest producers of original scripted television dramas for broadcast in prime time in the Russian language, selling its productions to a number of Russian television broadcasting networks, including NTV and RTR, as well as to other broadcasters in other Russian speaking areas of the world (or where Russian is widely spoken). In the last 10 years the NMDC has produced over 3,000 original episodes, many of which have won awards and garnered high viewership shares. NMDC also owns a number of pay television thematic channels, including Detskii Mir (Children's World), TeleKlub, Nashe Kino (Our Movies) and Mir Seriala (World of Series). NMDC is headquartered in George Town, the Cayman Islands, and has operating subsidiaries in Russia and a number of other European countries.
- In March, the Israeli police initiated a money laundering probe into the employees and clients of Bank Hapoalim, Branch 535. Bank Hapoalim is one of the largest and oldest banks in Israel. Gusinsky was among a number of people who were investigated. A year later, the Israeli Prosecutor's Office dropped all charges against Gusinsky without any additional conditions or negotiations and with prejudice. Several years later, in 2010, the Israeli courts have determined that the actions of the Prosecutor's Office in this money laundering investigation were excessive and unreasonable and sanctioned the prosecutors involved in the investigation.
- In December, Gusinsky created a sister site to Newsru.com, called Newsru.co.il. While it had an independent editorial board, it retained a similar design as the Russian counterpart. The Israeli site provided Russian language news about Israel's domestic and international affairs as well as world news. Currently, Newsru.co.il is among the most popular Russian language news sites in Israel. It has an average of 20 million page views and 1.5 million unique visitors monthly.

2007

- In first quarter of 2007, Gusinsky decided to create a general entertainment television channel in Ukraine. Gusinsky started to work with an acquaintance, Konstantin Kagalovsky, to jointly bring the Ukrainian TV project to life.
- In April, Gusinsky opened a new sister internet project, this time in Ukraine – Newsru.ua, similar to the Russian and Israeli sites, it had an independent editorial board but retained the design, and provided news about Ukrainian's domestic and international affairs and world news. This site was featured both in the Russian and Ukrainian languages.

2008

- In March, Gusinsky and Kagalovsky jointly put the general entertainment channel in Ukraine on air, naming it TVi. TVi was quickly and steadily rising in both coverage and popularity.

2009

- In the spring, Gusinsky and Kagalovsky began to have disputes about the direction TVi was taking. In September, Kagalovsky surreptitiously and, according to him, in a "Russian-Ukrainian way", diluted Gusinsky's share in TVi from 50% to less than 1%. In December, Gusinsky sued Kagalovsky for theft of TVi, in the Supreme Court of New York Commercial Division.

2012

- In March, Gusinsky sold RTVi to Ruslan Sokolov, a Russian media executive and businessman.
- In August, Gusinky won a judgement against Kagalovsky and his companies for theft of TVi in an amount of over US$30 million. Kagalovsky appealed.

2014

- In April, the New York Court of Appeals upheld the judgment against Kagalovsky for theft of TVi.

== Other investments ==
Gusinsky had a shareholding in the Hapoel Tel Aviv basketball team for a period of three and a half years, acquiring 60% of the team in November 2000.

Until November 2008, Gusinsky held 27% of the shares in the prominent Israeli second largest newspaper Maariv, which he exchanged with Bank Hapolaim to settle a debt to the bank.

He was one of the main forces behind the Moscow Holocaust museum, having lost several family members to the Holocaust.

== Property in Spain ==
In San Roque at Sotogrande, in the Province of Cádiz, Gusinsky purchased during the early 1990s Krusero (Russian: "Крусеро") a 536-square-metre (5,770 sq ft) luxurious villa on a 3,500-square-metre (38,000 sq ft) property.

During the 1990s, Gusinsky stated that Gibraltar is his "financial homeland" and that Spain is his "second home". He often travels by boat for the 13-mile (21 km) trip from Sotogrande to Gibraltar where his Gulfstream jet is kept.

== See also ==
- Semibankirschina
- Michael R. Caputo
