= Yuli Edelstein =

Israeli politician and former Speaker of the Knesset

- יולי אדלשטיין
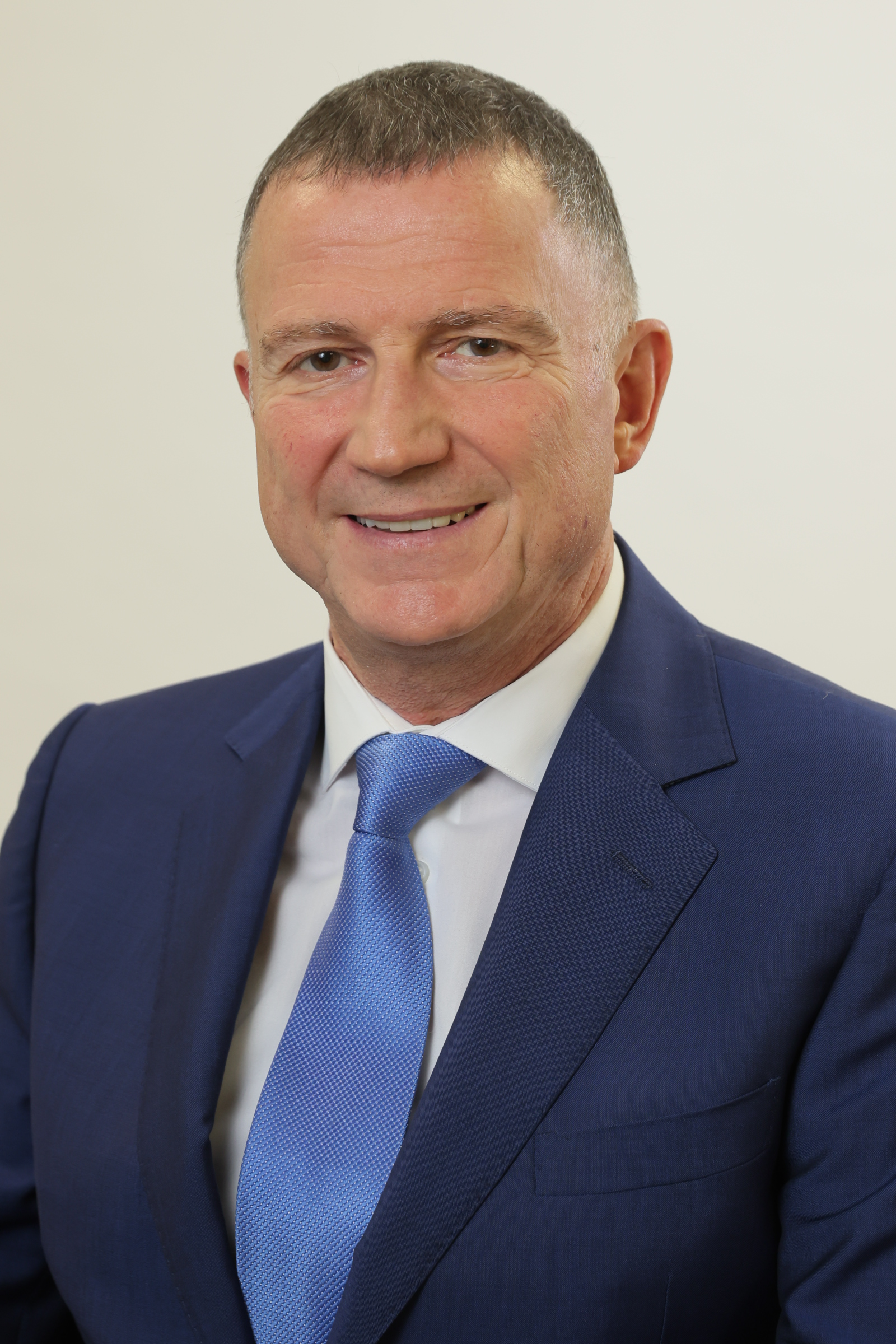
- Official portrait, 2022

Speaker of the Knesset
- In office 18 March 2013 – 25 March 2020
- Preceded by: Reuven Rivlin
- Succeeded by: Benny Gantz

Ministerial roles
- 1996–1999: Minister of Immigrant Absorption
- 2009–2013: Minister of Information & Diaspora
- 2020–2021: Minister of Health

Faction represented in the Knesset
- 1996–2003: Yisrael BaAliyah
- 2003–2006: Likud
- 2007–2026: Likud

Personal details
- Born: Yulian Yur'evich Edelshtein (Юлиан Юрьевич Эдельштейн) (Note: In this name that follows East Slavic naming customs, the patronymic is Yuryevich and the family name is Edelshtein.); 5 August 1958 (age 68) Chernivtsi, Ukrainian SSR, Soviet Union
- Citizenship: Soviet Union (1958–1987); Israel (since 1987)
- Party: Unity (since 2026)
- Other political affiliations: National Religious Party (formerly); Yisrael BaAliyah (1996–2003); Likud (2003–2026)
- Spouse(s): Tatiana Freivort (m. 1981; died 2014) Irina Nevzlin (m. 2016)
- Children: 2
- Relatives: Yuri Edelstein (father); Leonid Nevzlin (father-in-law)
- Education: Moscow Pedagogical Institute (expelled)

Yuli-Yoel Edelstein (Hebrew: יולי יואל אדלשטיין, Russian: Юлий Йоэль Эдельштейн; born 5 August 1958) is an Israeli politician, co-founder of the Yisrael BaAliyah party, and a senior figure in Likud.

A former Soviet refusenik, Edelstein has served as a member of the Knesset since 1996, holding senior roles including Speaker of the Knesset (2013–2020), Minister of Health (2020–2021), and chairman of the Foreign Affairs and Defense Committee (2022–2025).

Breaking with Likud, he announced in June 2026 that he was leaving the party and launched a new right-wing political party, Unity, with Gilad Erdan in August 2026. The party did not submit its list in the election.

== Early life ==
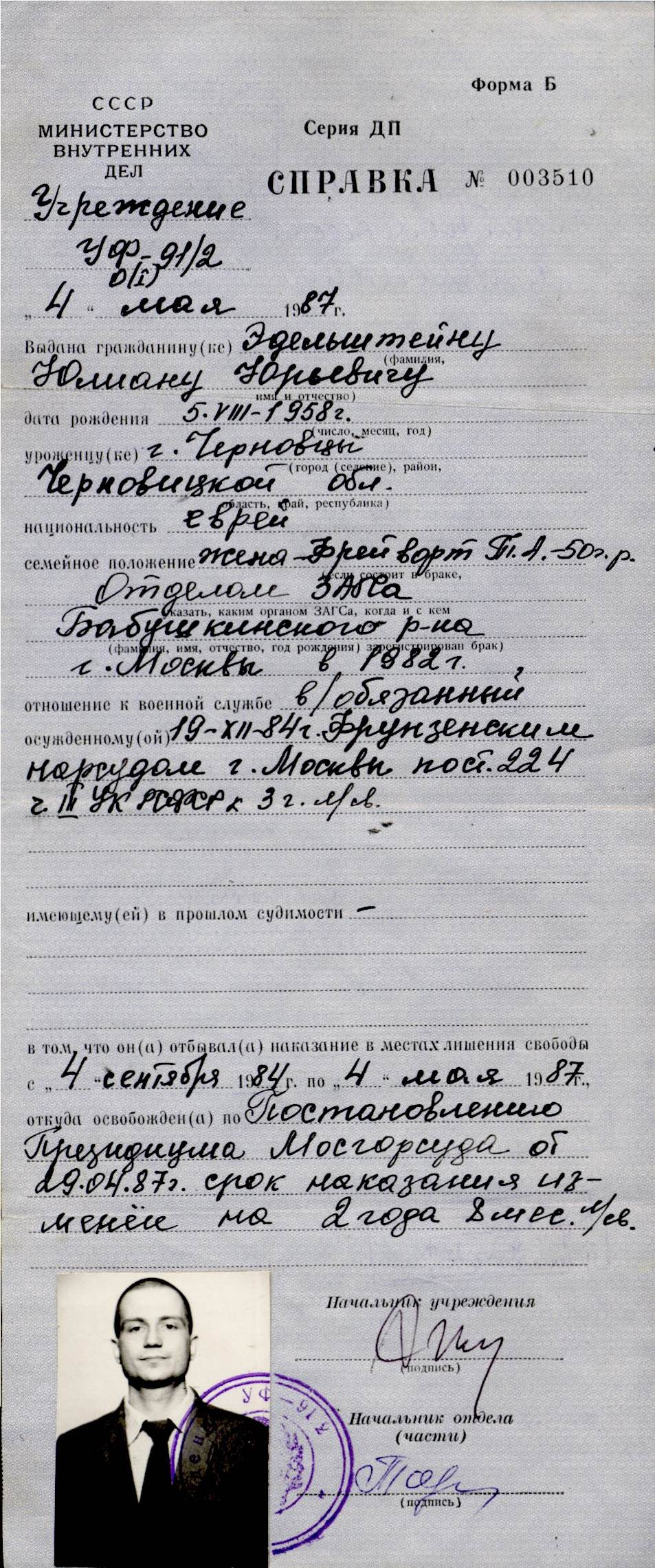
Edelstein's prison release record from the Moscow MVD, 1987

Yuli Edelstein was born in Chernivtsi in the Soviet Union (now Ukraine) to a Jewish family. His mother, Anita Edelstein, was Jewish, while his father, Yuri Edelstein, is the son of a Jewish father and Christian mother. Both converted to Christianity and Yuri is now a Russian Orthodox priest in Karabanovo of Kostroma Oblast named Father Georgy. While his parents taught at universities in the countryside, Edelstein was raised by his maternal grandparents. His grandfather had taught himself Hebrew at the age of 70 and used to listen to the Voice of Israel on a shortwave radio. When Edelstein's grandfather died, Yuli began to study Hebrew and read books such as Exodus by Leon Uris.

In 1977, during his second year of university, Edelstein applied for an exit visa to emigrate to Israel. Turned down, he began to associate with a small group of Hebrew teachers who held classes in their apartments. One of Edelstein's students was refusenik Alexander Smukler. In 1979, alongside Ephraim Kholmianski and Yuri Koroshovsky, Edelstein founded an underground organization, known as the 'City Project', with the intent of training Hebrew teachers and distributing Hebrew learning materials. That year, he was expelled from university and suffered harassment by the KGB and local police. During this time, he found odd jobs as a street cleaner, security guard, and more.

In 1984, he and other Hebrew teachers were arrested on fabricated charges, Edelstein himself being charged with possession of drugs, and sentenced to three years. He was then sent to Siberian penal colonies and did hard labor, first in Buryatia and then in Novosibirsk. He broke several bones after falling from a construction tower. He was due to be transferred back to Buryatia, but his wife, Tatiana (Tanya), threatened to go on hunger strike if he was returned there.

Edelstein was released on 13 May 1987, on the eve of Israeli Independence Day, the next to last of the refuseniks to be freed. He then emigrated to Israel, moving to the West Bank settlement of Alon Shvut. He did his national service in the Israel Defense Forces, attaining the rank of corporal.

== Political career ==
=== Early career ===
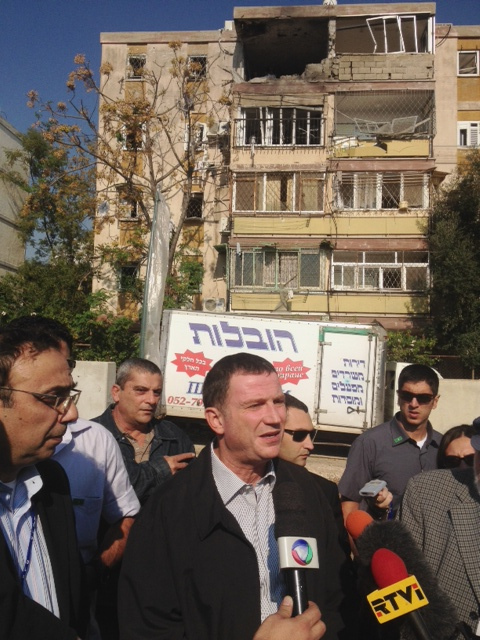
Edelstein as Information Minister, briefing reporters at site of Hamas rocket attack, 2012

Initially a member of the National Religious Party and a vice-president of the Zionist Forum, Edelstein founded the Yisrael BaAliyah party together with fellow Soviet dissident Natan Sharansky. He was elected to the Knesset in 1996, and was appointed Minister of Immigrant Absorption in Benjamin Netanyahu's Likud-led government. The long-term project of subsidizing housing for elderly migrants prepared by the ministry under his supervision and cooperation with the Ministry of Construction raised controversy over expenditures overrun incurred by the project. Edelstein claimed that the investigative commission found such claims unsubstantiated. He was re-elected in 1999, and was appointed Deputy Immigrant Absorption Minister by Ariel Sharon in 2001.

He retained his seat in the 2003 elections, shortly after which Yisrael BaAliyah merged into Likud. Although Edelstein lost his seat in the 2006 elections, in which Likud was reduced to 12 seats (Edelstein was 14th on the party's list), he re-entered the Knesset as a replacement for Dan Naveh in February 2007. He retained his seat in the 2009 elections after being placed twelfth on the party's list, and was appointed Minister of Information and Diaspora in the Netanyahu government. He was subsequently re-elected in 2013 after being placed on the eighteenth spot of the Likud Yisrael Beiteinu list.

=== Speaker of the Knesset ===
Following the 2013 elections, Edelstein was nominated by Likud Yisrael Beiteinu to replace then Speaker of the Knesset Reuven Rivlin. His nomination was approved by all members of the party's parliamentary caucus excluding Rivlin, who chose to abstain. It was then approved by the Knesset, with 96 members voting in favor and 8 abstaining. Edelstein was sworn in as speaker on 14 March. Edelstein was elected to the third place on the Likud list ahead of the 2015 election. He was subsequently re-elected to the Knesset and then as Speaker, with 103 Members of the Knesset voting in favor and 7 abstaining. During his tenure as speaker, Edelstein supported the Nation-State Bill. Ahead of the April 2019 election, Edelstein was elected to the second place on the Likud list. After the election, he was re-elected as Speaker, with 101 MKs voting in favor and 4 abstaining.

Following the 2020 election, a bloc led by Benny Gantz agreed to replace Edelstein as speaker of the Knesset. Despite this he refused to convene the plenary to vote on his replacement. The Movement for Quality Government in Israel appealed to the Supreme Court, which ordered Edelstein to convene the Knesset. On 25 March, Edelstein resigned as speaker to prevent a constitutional crisis. On 26 March, a newly formed coalition led by Netanyahu and Gantz elected the latter to be sworn in as the new Knesset Speaker.

=== After speakership ===
Following the establishment of the thirty-fifth government, Edelstein was sworn in as minister of health on 17 May 2020, and remained as minister until the thirty-sixth government was sworn in on 13 June 2021. On 11 October, he announced his intention to challenge Netanyahu for the leadership of the Likud in the next leadership election. Ahead of the 2022 election, he withdrew from the race, leading to its cancellation due to a lack of candidates. In primaries for the party list held in August, Edelstein was placed on the 18th place on the Likud list and returned to the Knesset. Upon the Knesset's inauguration, Edelstein was elected chairman of the Knesset's Foreign Affairs and Defense Committee. Likud voted to replace him with Boaz Bismuth on 23 July 2025, over his unwillingness to put forth a law mandating Haredi conscription. Over a week later, the Knesset House Committee approved Bismuth's appointment, with the Knesset Foreign Affairs and Defense Committee voting in favor of it shortly after. Edelstein sent his proposed version of the draft law, which would have implemented various penalties for draft evaders, including cancellation of driver's licenses and banning their international travel, to lawmakers earlier in the day.

He voted in late October for the preliminary reading of a bill, which called for annexing the West Bank, while all other Likud members boycotted it. The following week, Ofir Katz, who serves as the whip for the coalition, informed Edelstein that he was being removed from his position on the Foreign Affairs and Defense Committee. His replacement on the committee is Tally Gotliv.

Edelstein stated in a June 2026 interview that was partially aired by Channel 12 that he planned to "set off on a new political path." On 13 July, he joined the opposition in voting against the coalition-backed Basic Law: Torah Study.

=== Post-Likud career ===
He launched a new party in August 2026 alongside Gilad Erdan, ahead of the 2026 Israeli legislative election.

The name of the party, Unity, was revealed on 11 August.

The party withdrew from the election in early September.

== Statements ==
In December 2014, in an interview with The Jerusalem Post, Edelstein warned world leaders against creating a Palestinian state that he thought would go to war with Israel.

In the same interview, Edelstein stated that he believes in Israeli-Palestinian coexistence. In 2014, he was one of several members of Knesset (MKs) who submitted complaints against Arab-Israeli MK Haneen Zoabi for supporting Hamas, which led to her six-month suspension. "I have been in the Knesset for almost 19 years," Edelstein said. "I remember Arab MKs joining me at the March of the Living and proposing social-oriented legislation with me. That is definitely not Zoabi. I believe in coexistence and fighting against those who harm it and I think that Zoabi's words and actions hurt coexistence. People hear her and think all Arabs must hate us and want to kill us. That is unhealthy, and we have to put an end to it."

Edelstein criticized 2020 US presidential candidate Bernie Sanders for saying that US military aid to Israel should instead be diverted toward assistance to Palestinians in the Hamas-run Gaza Strip. Edelstein said that Sanders should "stop talking nonsense," reported Allison Kaplan Sommer for Haaretz.

In July 2024, Israeli military police visited the Sde Teiman detention camp to detain nine Israeli soldiers suspected of abusing a Palestinian prisoner. Edelstein condemned the situation, telling Haaretz, "It is unacceptable for masked military police to raid an IDF base… Our soldiers are not criminals, and this despicable pursuit of our fighters cannot be tolerated."

== Personal life ==
After leaving Alon Shvut, Edelstein moved to Neve Daniel, another settlement in the West Bank. He was married to Tatiana (Tanya) Edelstein, who was a Zionist activist, for 33 years. They met in the Soviet Union when she attended a Hebrew class he was teaching. After immigrating to Israel, she worked as a civil engineer at the Civil Aviation Authority. Tanya and Yuli Edelstein had two children together. In 2014, Tanya died of cancer at the age of 63.

In June 2016, Edelstein married Irina Nevzlin, daughter of Russian-Israeli billionaire Leonid Nevzlin, chair of the Board of Directors of Anu - Museum of the Jewish People , and President of the NADAV Foundation.

== Notes ==
Political offices
Preceded by Reuven Rivlin	Speaker of the Knesset; 2013–2020	Next: Benny Gantz
