= Konstantin Kostin (politician) =

Russian politician

- Константин Костин
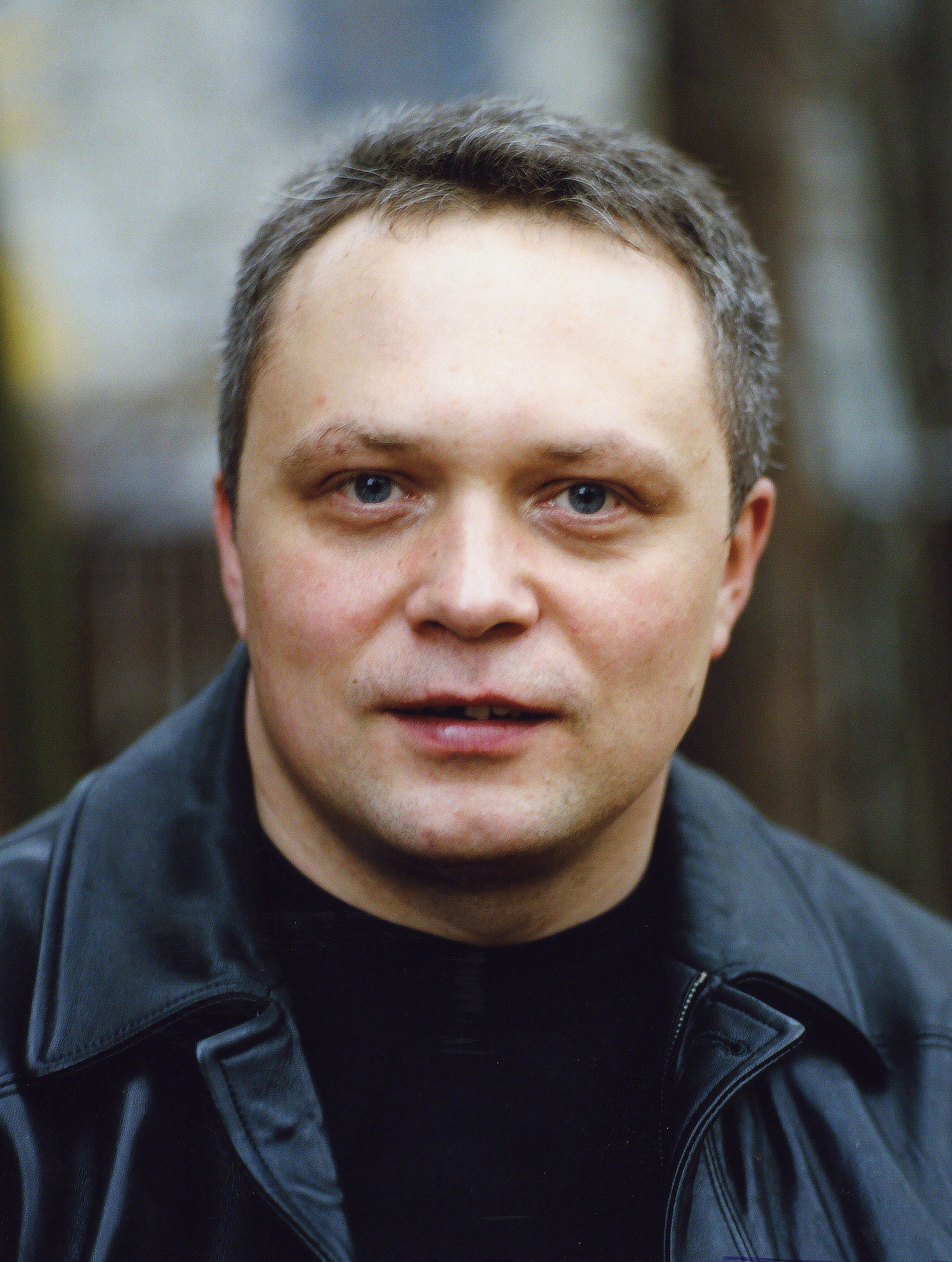
- Kostin in 2010
- Born: September 17, 1970 (age 56); Pushkin, Moscow Region, USSR
- Occupation: Deputy head of the internal politics of the presidential administration of Russia
- Spouse: Olga Nikolaevna Kostina
- Children: 1

Konstantin Nikolaevich Kostin (Russian: Константин Николаевич Костин; born September 17, 1970) is a Russian politician, deputy head of the internal politics of the presidential administration of Russia.

He has the federal state civilian service rank of 1st class Active State Councillor of the Russian Federation.

== Persona ==
In 2008 and 2009 Kostin was ranked second in the top 20 best political strategists in Russia, according to Obschaya Gazeta. As of June 2010, along with Gennady Onishchenko, he holds 90-91 places in the top hundred leading politicians of Russia, according to Nezavisimaya Gazeta.

The former head of PR structures of Menatep Bank, ROSPROM Management Company, Yukos oil company, a member of the Board of Directors of ORT television, Vice President of mass media holding Sistema Company.

Actively participated in several presidential election campaigns, including in 1996 (Boris Yeltsin), 2000 and 2004 (Vladimir Putin) and 2008 (Dmitry Medvedev). Considered to be the “right hand” of Vladislav Surkov.

== Activity ==
=== Journalism ===
In 1993 Kostin graduated from the faculty of journalism of the Moscow State University named after M. B. Lomonosov. As a student, he served as an intern in Italy and the United States. Since 1986, he published and worked as a staff correspondent in various print media, including Student Meridian. In 1990–1991, he worked as a correspondent of the Kommersant newspaper.

=== Menatep ===
Since 1991, Kostin worked in the Marketing Communications Agency Metapress, associated with Mikhail Khodorkovsky’s Menatep. In 1991, Konstantin Kostin wrote about Metapress in Kommersant magazine (Later – Vlast’):

The establishment of the agency almost coincided in time with accreditation of the American company PBN in the USSR, which also offered PR-services (see Kommersant # 33 (83)). However, observers say, cooperation with Metapress could be more attractive to domestic businesses as the agency accepted payment in rubles and had good connections with the media, according to some sources.

In 1992, Kostin became an executive director of this advertising agency responsible for public relations issues. In September of the same year he headed the executive bureau of the Russian Association of Advertisers (RAAs). While in Metapress, he met Vladislav Surkov.

From 1994 to 1997, Kostin served as head of advertising for Menatep Bank, in 1997–1998, he served as the Bank Media Director. His wife, Olga Kostina, shared details of Konstantin's work of that time in an interview with Profile magazine:

Konstantin participated in the first steps of the advertising business in Russia. He developed advertising for Menatep Bank, as well as a series of advertising posters for Menatep Visa card.

In late 1996, Kostin, while serving as vice-president of Menatep Bank, in the interests of the bank had been working on the affiliation of the Literary Gazette. In 1997-1998 Konstantin Kostin served as the chairman of the Board of Directors of CJSC Publishing House Literary Gazette. Since 1998 he served as the chairman of the Board of Directors of the newspaper Reklamny Mir.

=== Union ===
In March 1993, Kostin co-founded advertising agency Public Relations Bureau, in 1993-1994 he served as its president.

In early 1996, PRB Soyuz was one of the eight largest Russian advertising agencies at that time (the other seven include APR-media, Znak, Ivan - Press, Korporatsia-Ya, Maxima, Solidarity Publisher, and Unis. The agencies received the status of accredited to Kommersant and exclusive advertisement placement terms. Kostin, as head of PRB Soyuz, commented on the creation of the cartel in the following words:

We are pleased to have been included in the group of agencies that had been offered accreditation. The new advertising policy of Kommersant, and Daily in particular, has all prerequisites for bringing order to the market of print advertising.

Kostin organized public relations support for many of the regional electoral campaigns in Russia and Ukraine. In particular, he worked at the election of members of the Verkhovna Rada of Ukraine, at the gubernatorial elections in Vladimir (Nikolai Vinogradov), Pskov (Yevgeny Mikhailov), Chita (Ravil Geniatulin), and other subjects of federation.

In 2003, he was accused by the opposition media of organizing work on discrediting the Communist Party in favor of the “party of power “at the instigation of Vladislav Surkov. In particular, Stanislav Belkovsky’s resource APN.ru wrote, citing an “unnamed source in the Russian special services” that 33-year-old political consultant Konstantin Kostin was appointed executive officer of the Special Operations Group of the presidential administration. However, there is another interpretation of the events:

At the end of the election campaign of 2003, Kostin almost kicked out Baranov, who offered, for a small monthly fee in foreign currency, “placement” of “black PR” on the official website of the Communist Party against the Communist Party itself.

In June 2005, Izvestia newspaper published “Letter of 50,” the address of workers of culture, science and public figures in connection with the conviction of former heads of Yukos, that condemned attempts to politicize the Yukos case. Following the publication, some media outlets attributed the authorship of the text to Konstantin Kostin. He himself, however, denied his involvement in its preparation. Among those who signed the “Letter of 50” were Stanislav Govorukhin, Alexander Kalyagin, Alexander Rosenbaum, Anastasia Volochkova, Alina Kabaeva, etc.

In 2005, the leader of the oppositional National Bolshevik Party Eduard Limonov spoke of the PRB as of “the most cynical and the most pro-Kremlin PR agency.” Vlast’ magazine described Soyuz in the following words:

Each of Surkov’s deputies [ ...] has a small office that formally has nothing to do with the government structures and is not funded by the state [...] Kostin (Konstantin Kostin, deputy head of the CEC United Russia. – Vlast’) has PR agency Soyuz.

=== Sistema ===
From June 1998 to 1999 Kostin served as Director of the Department of Economics and Project Management of the media and advertising group Sistema Mass Media, a part of Vladimir Yevtushenkov's JSFC Sistema. In 1999, structures affiliated with Yevtushenkov sent Kostin to the election headquarters of the electoral bloc Otechestvo, where he conducted public relations activities.

He later became an advisor to Vladislav Surkov.

=== United Russia ===
In May 2005, the Bureau of the General Council of United Russia, on the recommendation of Surkov, has approved Kostin's candidacy for the position of deputy chairman of the CEC of the Party, responsible for PR. Kostin came as a replacement for Vladimir Medina. Valery Draganov, general council member of the presidium of the Party, named non-involvement in public policy, absence of bias and ability to focus “on what is inherent in any CEC - technology, management, and resource management” as Kostin's best qualities. Kostin left the position in September 2007.

While serving as deputy chairman of the CEC United Russia, Kostin, in particular, was involved in the rebranding of the “Youth Unity” into “Young Guard of United Russia.” In an interview with Kommersant, Kostin explained the name change with its irrelevance: “The Unity Party no longer exists.” Kommersant wrote in 2006 that, as an adviser to Surkov, Kostin had broad discretion, particularly in promoting the image of “sovereign democracy,” as well as access of the party members to the media.

In 2007, Kostin was accused by the Israeli press in pursuit of (in particular, organization of interception of private conversations) political emigrant Leonid Nevzlin, the second person in Yukos structures before the arrest of Mikhail Khodorkovsky. In addition, at the same time the opposition publications wrote that he was involved with the activity targeted against Anton Bakov (PCA).

=== Presidential Administration ===
In June 2008, Konstantin Kostin replaced Alexei Chesnakov as deputy managing internal politics of the presidential administration of Russia. The opposition political analyst Vladimir Pribylovsky gave the following assessment of the appointment:

Chesnakov patronized the most blatant methods of processing of public opinion and pressure on the opposition, and Kostin, in this sense, was a bit softer.

Among other things, Kostin worked with the regional political elite and oversaw a number of media outlets, including networks. According to Alexei Mukhin, general director of the Center for Political Information, the department

...has always been and always will be the most important department in the presidential administration, connecting virtually all sectors and all projects implemented by the Presidential Administration.

According to Gazeta.Ru newspaper, Kostin is also the supervisor of the United Russia party from the presidential administration.

=== Civil Society Development Foundation ===
In May 2012, Konstantin Kostin resigned from his position in the Russian Presidential Administration, and founded a non-governmental organisation of which he became Chairman - Civil society development foundation. Other organisations behind the Foundation's creation were:

The ‘Russian Public Policy Centre’ The ‘Institute for Public Projects’ - an autonomous non-profit organisation. (ANO) ‘Support for Russia – a nation-wide public organisation which supports small and medium-sized businesses ‘Media Union’ an organisation which represents the National Union of Workers in the mass media.

Konstantin Kostin describes the Foundation's defining ethos as being the intention to study the history and sociology of the mood of protest in society. ‘It is a subject that has never been studied in any depth and never on a large scale’ he says.

Gleb Pavlovsky, director of the Effective Policy Foundation, believes that Konstantin ‘was one of the most important links between the Kremlin and outside reality.’ A political strategist, Pavlovsky draws attention to the ‘incredible work ethic’ of the Head of the new organisation. The purpose of the new Foundation, Pavlovsky believes, can be summed up as follows:

‘The Foundation is a relatively independent organisation, closely affiliated with the Department of Internal Policy, but at the same time, not a part of it. Its role is to predict outcomes by gathering objective information which hopefully can be interpreted in a professional way, and will have some use both at election time and also in working out general strategies.’

== Political views ==
In 2006, in an interview with Eugenia Albats on radio Echo of Moscow, Kostin said:

I myself am a supporter of the parliamentary model, but our party today, at this stage, considers this presidential model appropriate

Administrative resource has always been there. It was there in the 1990s. I worked in the headquarters of B. N. Yeltsin’s election campaign. I have never seen a more cynical use of administrative resources, dirtier manipulative technologies – never

In an interview with Kommersant the same year, Konstantin Kostin suggested involving youth in politics:

Incentives, including material incentives, is not a bad idea. Many effective democracies use certain mechanisms to encourage social activity of the population, both at the state and party level. Both the U.S. and Germany have such budget items. People are not only encouraged, but also punished, for example, for non-participation in elections.

After the second attempt of nationalist “Russian March” held in Moscow in the fall of 2006, in his interview with Russian Newsweek Konstantin Kostin predicted alleviation of ethnic nationalism:

Next year this political force will not be around. After such a failure there won’t be other attempts.

== Personal life ==
Kostin is Russian, resides in Moscow. Master of Sports of the USSR in judo. Other sports interests include tennis, jogging, skiing.

Wife (since 1993) - Olga Kostina, former political consultant to Mikhail Khodorkovsky, and later advisor to the mayor of Moscow, head of the Office of Public Affairs of Moscow Government, known as witness in the case of the head of Yukos security service Alexei Pichugin. As a result of the case, Pichugin was sentenced to 20 years of imprisonment, and Nevzlin was put on a wanted list.

In the aforementioned interview with Profile magazine, Olga described her first meeting with her future husband:

My first impression of Konstantin was quite mixed. He appeared to be a man with excessively high self-esteem, overly confident. But I liked men who were stubborn in achieving their goals. It all began with sympathy, and then I just fell in love.

Konstantin and Olga are a raising a daughter together.
