= Konstantin Kostin =

Konstantin Kostin may refer to:

- Konstantin Kostin (figure skater)
- Konstantin Kostin (politician)
