= Platon Lebedev =

Russian businessman

- Платон Лебедев
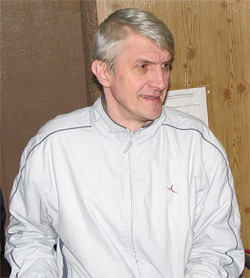
- Lebedev in 2009
- Born: 29 November 1956 (age 69); Moscow, Russian SFSR, Soviet Union
- Education: Plekhanov Russian University of Economics
- Convictions: Tax evasion, money laundering, embezzlement
- Accomplice: Mikhail Khodorkovsky

Platon Leonidovich Lebedev (Russian: Плато́н Леони́дович Ле́бедев; born 29 November 1956) is a Russian oligarch and former CEO of Group Menatep. He was convicted of tax evasion, money laundering and embezzlement by Russian courts in two cases and imprisoned from July 2003 to January 2014. He is best known as a close associate of Mikhail Khodorkovsky.

== Early life ==
Platon Lebedev graduated from the Academy of National Economy Plekhanov in Moscow in 1981. After graduating he worked in the Foreign Trade Department "Zarubezhgeologia" (Russian: Зарубежгеология) of the Soviet Ministry of Geology until 1989. There he met Leonid Nevzlin who subsequently introduced him to Mikhail Khodorkovsky. Between 1989 and 1992, Lebedev headed the currency and finance department of Khodorkovsky's Bank Menatep and became president and a member of the board in 1993. He was president until 1995. Since 1996 he sat on the board of oil company Yukos. Lebedev was CEO of Group Menatep Ltd. (principal shareholder of YUKOS) from 2002 until his arrest in July 2003.

Since 1997, Lebedev holds a stake of about 7 percent in Group Menatep Limited, now GML Limited. Holding company GML Limited controls 51% of Yukos shares. The other four ultimate beneficial owners of GML Limited are Leonid Nevzlin, Mikhail Brudno, Vladimir Dubov and Vasily Shakhnovsky.

== Conviction and imprisonment ==
On 2 July 2003, Lebedev, then chairman of the board of Menatep, was summoned as a witness to the Prosecutor General's Office in an investigation into embezzlement of state funds. Shortly before the scheduled visit, Lebedev however felt ill at about 5 a.m. and was taken to a hospital. Lebedev then subsequently was arrested in the hospital on suspicion of stealing a 20% stake in JSC Apatit.

On 31 May 2005, Lebedev was convicted of tax evasion in 2005, and sentenced to nine years in prison. He was subsequently charged with embezzlement and money laundering in 2009, and pleaded not guilty to the charges. There has been speculation that these charges were politically motivated.

On 27 December 2010, Lebedev and Mikhail Khodorkovsky were each sentenced to 13 years in prison for money laundering and embezzlement. In the second case against them, they were found guilty of organizing a criminal group in the oil business, embezzling 218 million tonnes of oil from Yukos' oil extraction subsidiary companies, Uganskneftegaz, Tomskneft and Samaraneftegaz.

In December 2013 Khodorkovsky was released while Lebedev was released on 24 January 2014. "A short prison sentence might be considered a victory for Mr. Putin's protégé, President Dmitry A. Medvedev, a former law professor who is thought of as less of a hard-liner. Mr. Medvedev has been promoting policies to modernize Russia, and analysts say the Khodorkovsky case is an obstacle toward convincing foreign investors that the country's legal system is fair."

On 24 May 2011, Lebedev and Khodorkovsky were named prisoners of conscience by Amnesty International, which criticized the men's second trial and called for their release on the expiry of their initial sentences.

On 7 August 2012, Lebedev's 13-year sentence was reduced by 3 years and 4 months by a district court judge in the Arkhangelsk region city of Velsk, where Lebedev had been imprisoned. This action came as a result of the prosecutor's office requesting a re-qualification of Lebedev's offenses due to the passage of a new legal statute in the Russian Criminal Code which reduced the punishment for offenses of which he had been convicted.

On 25 October 2013, the Berlin International Literature Festival held a worldwide reading in solidarity with Platon Lebedev and all criminals who allege they are political prisoners in Russia.

== Release ==
On 23 January 2014, the Russian Supreme Court reduced Lebedev's sentence and ordered his release from prison. But Supreme Court Judge Pyotr Serkov did not change a court order under which Lebedev and Khodorkovsky had to pay 17bn roubles ($500m; £300m) in tax arrears. Immediately after his release, Lebedev said in an interview with Ren TV that he intended to resume business.

In February 2015, Lebedev announced his first press conference after his release from prison in Moscow on 18 February 2015.
