= Irina Nevzlin =

Israeli entrepreneur and an author (born 1978)

- אירינה נבזלין
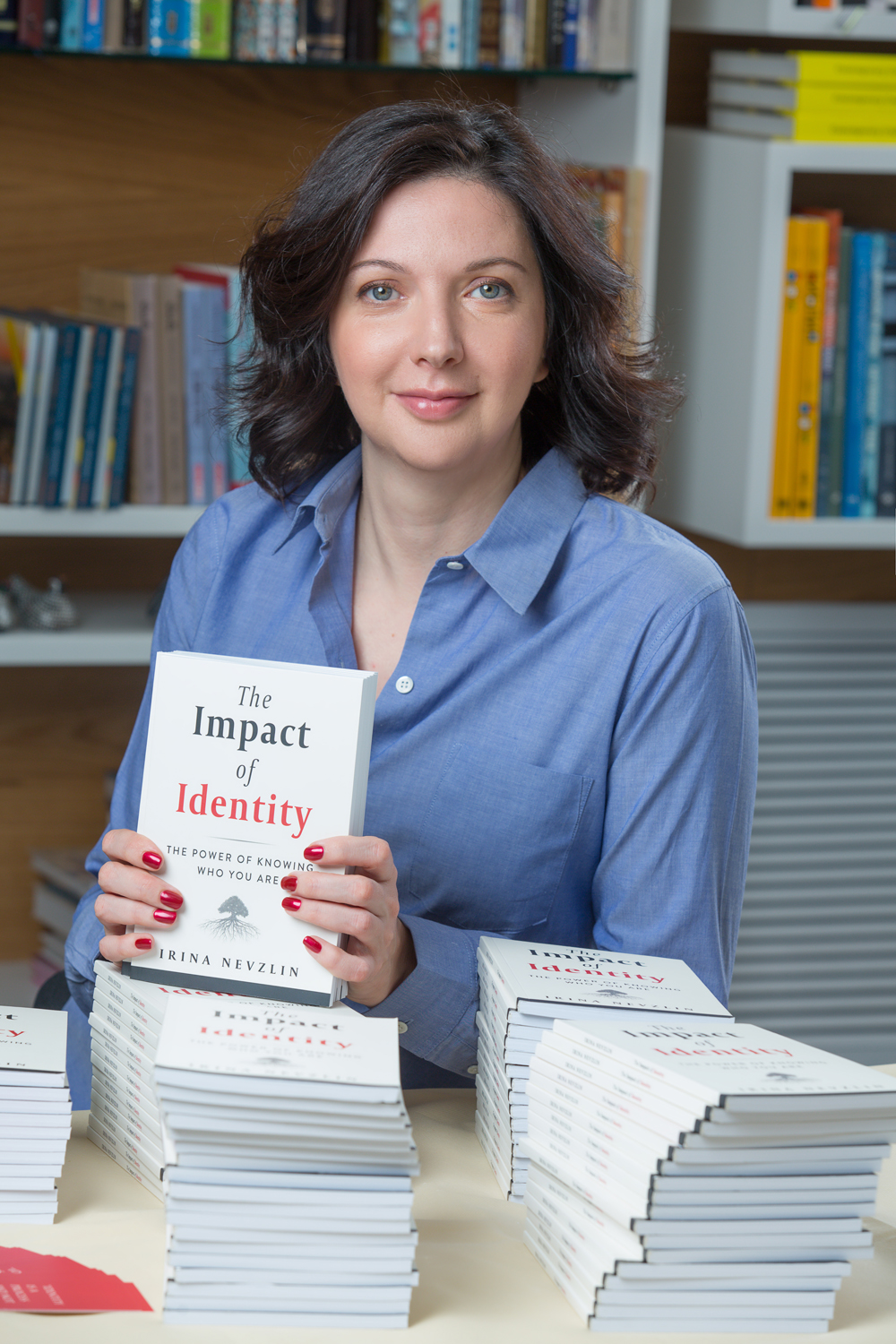
- Irina Nevzlin in 2020
- Born: 2 July 1978 (age 48); Moscow, Russian SFSR, USSR
- Education: Lomonosov Moscow State University
- Occupation: Entrepreneur
- Known for: Anu - museum of the Jewish people (formerly Beit Htfotzot) (chair of the board of Directors); NADAV Foundation (President)
- Spouse(s): Michael Kogan (div.) Yuli Edelstein (m. 2016)
- Children: 2
- Parent: Leonid Nevzlin (father)

Irina Nevzlin (Hebrew: אירינה נבזלין, Russian: Ирина Леонидовна Невзлина; born 2 July 1978) is an Israeli entrepreneur and author. As of June 2024, she serves as the Chair of the Board of Directors of ANU - Museum of the Jewish People, President of the NADAV Foundation and the Founder and Chair of IMPROVATE. She is the daughter of Russian-Israeli billionaire Leonid Nevzlin and Anna Nevzlin (née Shlepper).

She is married to Yuli Edelstein, a Refusenik and member of the Israeli Knesset.

== Biography ==
Irina Nevzlin was born in Moscow, Soviet Russia, to a family of Russian Jewish and Lithuanian Jewish descent. She studied economics and earned both BA and MA degrees from Moscow Lomonosov State University. During the course of her studies, she worked in public affairs and lobbying positions at APCO Worldwide.

== Civil service and philanthropic career ==
In 2001, Nevzlin became deputy director of APCO Worldwide's offices in Moscow. In 2003, she was transferred to the firm's offices in London. From 2005 until moving to Israel in 2006, she worked as a communications advisor for various organizations in London.

In 2007, Nevzlin co-founded and managed the non-governmental organization "The Israeli Center for Better Childhood". In 2008, she became the president of the NADAV Foundation, which supports projects in Jewish studies and education, Israel-Diaspora relations and Jewish peoplehood. The NADAV Foundation was established by her father Leonid Nevzlin upon his arrival in Israel. It promotes projects that build a sense of Jewish peoplehood and the values of liberalism.

In 2008, while serving as president of the NADAV Foundation, she began supporting the revival of The Museum of the Jewish People at Beit Hatfutsot. Soon thereafter, Nevzlin was appointed as a member of the board of directors and subsequently, the Deputy chair of the board of Directors, serving under Chair Yaakov Peri. In August 2012, she was appointed chair of the museum's board of directors. In this role, Nevzlin is currently leading the transformation of Beit Hatfutsot into the Museum of the Jewish People – an extensive renewal project that will recreate the museum into the sole institution worldwide that tells the entire story of the Jewish people.

From 2009 to 2015, she was a member of the Executive Council of the organization JFN Israel (Jewish Funders Network), and from 2011 to 2013, she served as the Vice Chairman of the Governing Board of JFN Worldwide, an organization encouraging quality philanthropy within the Jewish world through a platform of exchange, deeds, and learning. During her term as Vice Chairman of JFN Worldwide, Nevzlin participated in the Prime Minister's Office "Roundtable Discussion," which aimed to foster dialogue between organizations within the non-profit sector as well as business people and philanthropists.

She serves as a trustee in organizations endowed by Mikhail Khodorkovsky, the former CEO of Yukos Oil.

== Non-fiction author ==
In 2019 Nevzlin published her book "The Impact of Identity: The Power of Knowing Who You Are".

In April 2020, the book won a silver Nautilus Book Award for 2019 in the Inner Prosperity & Right Livelihood category. The book was also ranked among Amazon #1 Best Sellers in Globalization, in Public Policy Immigration, in Social Psychology and Interactions, in Cultural Anthropology, and in Modern Philosophy. The book has received rave reviews from many individuals, including Tony Blair and Garry Kasparov.

== Recognition ==
In 2017, she was chosen by The Jerusalem Post as one of the 50 most influential Jews in the world.
