= Civil Society Development Foundation =

Russian non-governmental organisation

The Foundation for Civil Society Development (FCSD)
- Founded: 2012
- Founders: Russian Public Policy Fund, Institute for Public Planning an independent non-profit organization, OPORA ROSSII the All-Russian public organization for SME, MediaSoyuz All-Russian public organization of mass media professionals.
- Type: Policy think tank
- Purpose: Research in politics, regional development and contemporary media
- Location: Moscow, Russia
- Key people: Konstantin Kostin
- Website: www.civilfund.ru

The Foundation for Civil Society Development (Russian: Фонд развития гражданского общества) is a non-governmental organisation whose main focus of research is in the fields of politics, regional development and contemporary media.

Its ultimate goal is to bridge the gap between academic research and practical politics, to ensure that its work is relevant and that the conclusions are easily applicable.

== Leadership ==
The foundation is headed by Konstantin Kostin (born September 17, 1970, in Pushkin, Moscow region) — Russian political Consultant. Up to May 2012 — deputy head of the internal politics of the presidential administration of Russia.

After leaving the Kremlin Kostin remains in good relations with the first Deputy head of the presidential Administration of the Russian Federation Vyacheslav Volodin, is his Adviser.

Mr. Kostin told Izvestia daily the essence of his foundation: 'We align ourselves closely to the RAND Corporation, a leading research ‘think tank’ in the USA. We are an institution that helps improve policy and decision-making through research and analysis'.

== Vision ==
Observers noted that the Kremlin changed the format of cooperation with the expert community: it was decided to attract specialists to work on government projects special funds-operators. It was emphasized that it is connected with the desire of the authorities to independent information in the analysis, including the electoral behavior of the Russians.

Director of Fund of effective policy Gleb Pavlovsky believes that Konstantin served as one of the most important links in view of the Kremlin with the realities. Political analyst notes «the incredible efficiency of the head of the new structure. The sense of the FCSD, in the opinion of Pavlovsky, is as follows: ‘we are talking about a relatively independent structure that is affiliated closely with the office of internal policy, but still it does not’.

According to Konstantin Simonov, Director of the National Energy Security Fund, the appointment of Konstantin Kostin as head of the Civil Society Development Foundation reflected a practice of former government officials moving into policy and analytical organizations. Simonov also argued that the foundation could contribute analytical work to government decision-making and stated that Russia lacked a sufficient number of independent analytical institutions.

The establishment of the Fund welcomed the Deputy of the State Duma, political scientist Vyacheslav Nikonov, who in an interview with PRAVDA.Ru, in particular, said: 'I have suggested to create a Fund for the support of civil society, because in this respect, Russia is lagging behind all the developed Western countries. And we have the level of support for our civil institutions from outside of Russia is more, than inside Russia. Therefore, I believe'.

== Activity ==
The Foundation implements scientific and research projects as well as distributes grants for other NGOs and R&D organizations covering the similar themes.

=== Research ===
The Fund released five major reports in 2012-2013:

- August 2013 – Research: '2013 Elections of Governors and Head of Regional Administrative Centres: campaign scenarios and forecasts'
- May 2013 – Research: President Putin's Year: results and prospects
- May 2013 - Report: Filtering Content on the Internet: Challenges, trends and techniques. An Analysis of International Practice
- March 2013 – Report on the Development o Civil Society in Russia
- Dec. 2012 - The New protest movement: myths and reality
- Oct. 2012 – Elections under new rules: main result and trends
- Oct. 2012 - Elections under new rules: intrigues and forecasts
- Sept. 2012 – RuNet today: research on the Russian Internet

Away from the Kremlin to the created Fund in May 2012, Konstantin Kostin in an interview to the magazine «Expert» predicted the development of the political activity in Russia for the period 2014–15 years: «Starting from 2014 is a series of very complicated regional elections," he said. "And if our opposition leaders will pass from spells and outdated slogans to real political work, right now realize that this is for the regions, and begin to act, then in 2014-2015 years they have somewhere will have good chances».

In a number of research, conducted by the Fund, a report on protests 2011-2012 is eminent. Kostin said that street policy is a global trend, which will be actual in Russia, but the «new protest wave is over», and the social groups, once united in December, «no longer feel a sense of community».

The objectivity of the research of the Foundation, as well as the estimates and statements of its head was confirmed by the expert community, the participants and the leaders of the protest movement.

The study, the article by Kostin in the «Moscow news» and a series of interviews by Kostin to various mass media on how the protest was seen from the Kremlin, among which, first of all is an interview to Gazeta.ru are of special interest for experts and historians.

=== Projects ===
==== New media research ====
The Foundation is launching new, large-scale project researching new media in Russia, using software from the Crimson Hexagon system – an analytics platform which automatically scans and sorts online content. The research will focus on a study of current social and political issues. This would essentially be an alternative in Russia to both "Medialogia" and the once popular – but now defunct - "Yandex Top blogs". The Fund contends that under the Crimson Hexagon scope is to be not just opposition, but authorities as well.

==== Atlas of political consultants ====
The Foundation developed an "Atlas of political consultants", described by the organization as a reference guide listing political consultants who had participated in election campaigns in Russia during the previous ten years. According to the Foundation, the project was intended to distinguish experienced political consultants ahead of the Single Voting Day on 8 September.

==== Rating of Russian regions ====
August 2013, the FDCS released first issue of a Rating of social well-being in the regions The research is based on data from the “Public Opinion” Foundation (FOM) and shows that Russian regions can be rated according to the peoples’ satisfaction levels with their current living situations - taking into account their attitude towards the authorities and protest potential. A person's sense of social security does not directly depend on the economic situations and living standards of that particular region. FDCS plans to monitor the dynamics of social well-being and to identify key parameters that affect its change.

The head of FOM, Aleksander Oslon, said that he was satisfied with the interpretation by the "geo-rating" method which has been in use for almost a decade and which is used primarily by the Presidential Administration. He is quoted as saying that "The Foundation for Civil Society Development utilises a clear and simple methodology: percentages are converted into points and summarised”.

==== Social science teachers conference ====
The Foundation designed a social science teachers conference as a long-term project. The main task ahead according to Mr. Kostin was to create a platform for meaningful and interesting discussion on political agendas and also the exchange of ideas between specialists, politicians and civil servants. Welcoming the very fest Conference Kostin expressed his confidence that the conference would help identify the most promising ways forward for further study and research and would lead to a series of lectures on modern day regional and federal politics with a view to creating teaching and learning aids for the younger generation. The conference involved lectures and discussions on the following topics: the latest teaching methods of social sciences; modern political sociology; the interaction between state and civil society; the development of Russia's political system.

== Official data ==
The Foundation for Civil Society Development (FCSD) was conceived on June 4, 2012.

=== Founders ===
The founders were: Russian Public Policy Fund, Institute for Public Planning an independent non-commercial organization, OPORA ROSSII the All-Russian public organization for SME, MediaSoyuz All-Russian public organization of mass media professionals.

=== Board ===
The Members of the Board are: K.N. Kostin (chairman of the Board @ CEO), A.Yu. Trubetskoy, S.R. Borisov, V.A. Fadeev, S.V. Stoyalova.

=== Expert council ===
Expert council members are: Leonid Davydov, PhD in political studies, chairman of the board for VTSIOM (Head of the Expert Council); Stanislav Yeremeev, Dean of the Faculty of Political Science, Saint- Petersburg State University; Leonid Polyakov, Head of the General Political Science Chair SU- HSE; Valeriy Fadeev, Director of the Institute for Public Planning, Expert Magazine, Editor-in-chief.
