= Anu – Museum of the Jewish People =

Museum of Jewish history and culture in Tel Aviv, Israel

Coordinates: 32°06′50″N 34°48′19″E

- אנו – מוזיאון העם היהודי
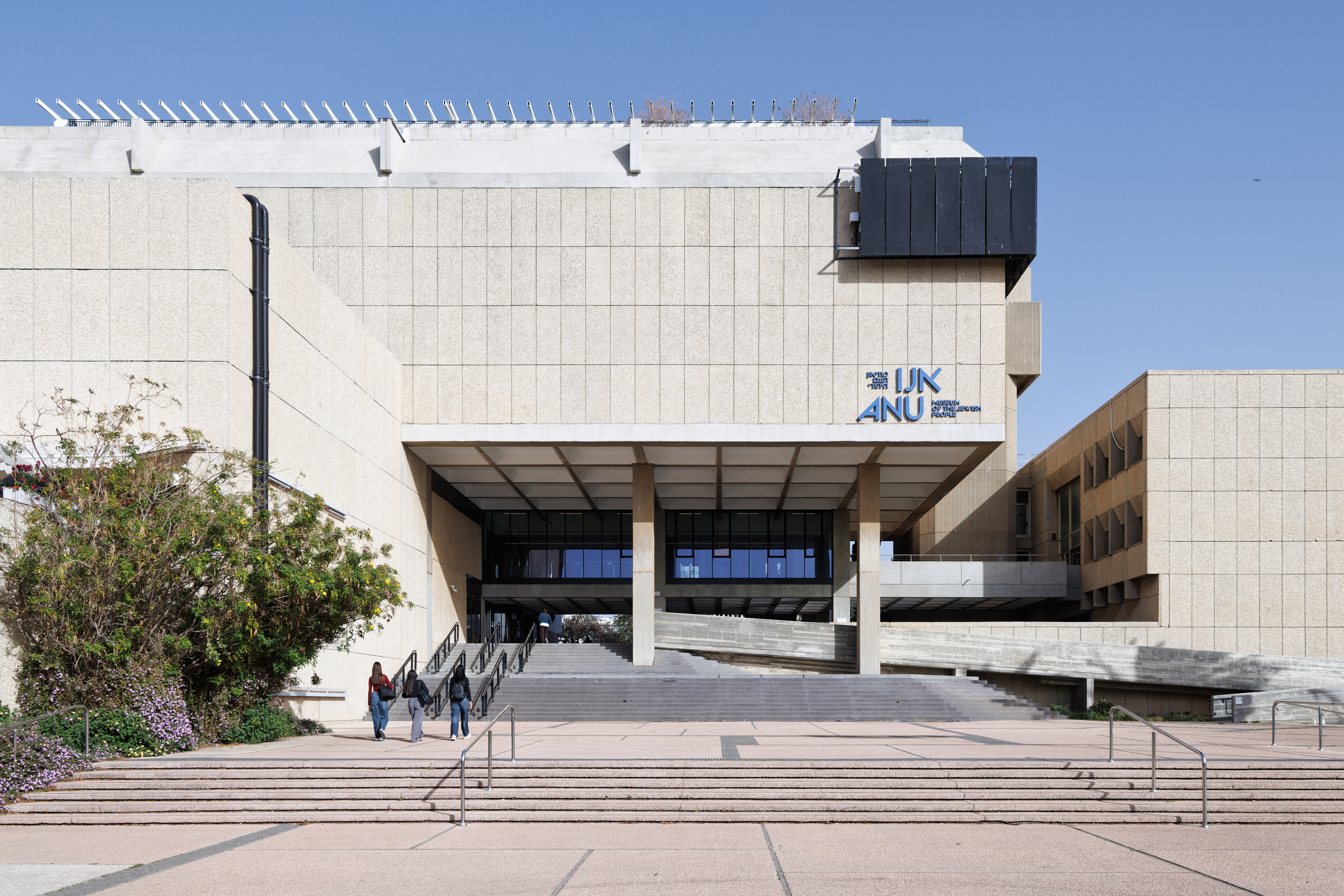
- Anu – Museum of the Jewish People building exterior
- Established: May 15, 1978
- Location: Tel Aviv University campus, Tel Aviv, Israel
- Type: Jewish museum
- Website: anumuseum.org.il

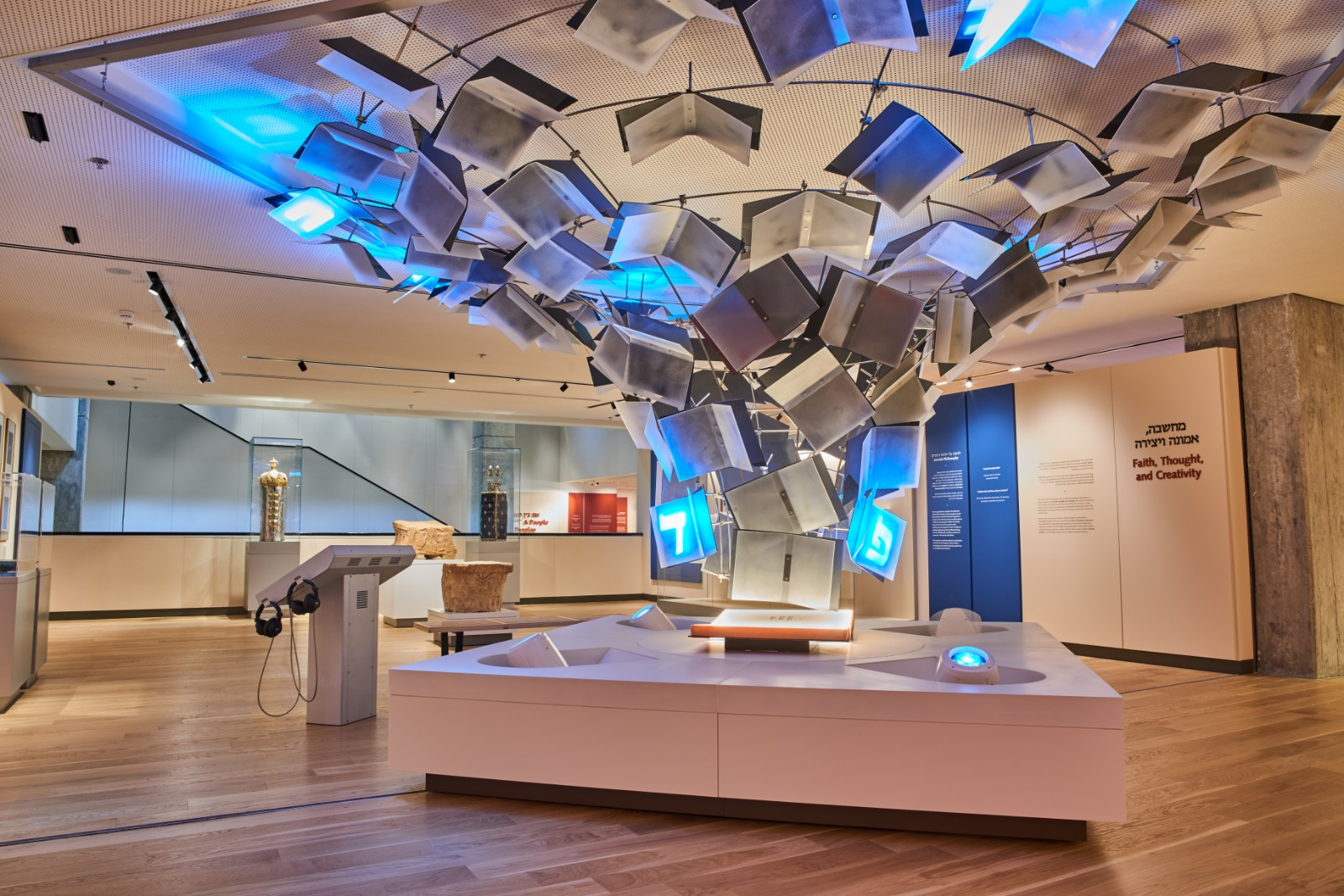
Anu – Museum of the Jewish People Foundations Wing

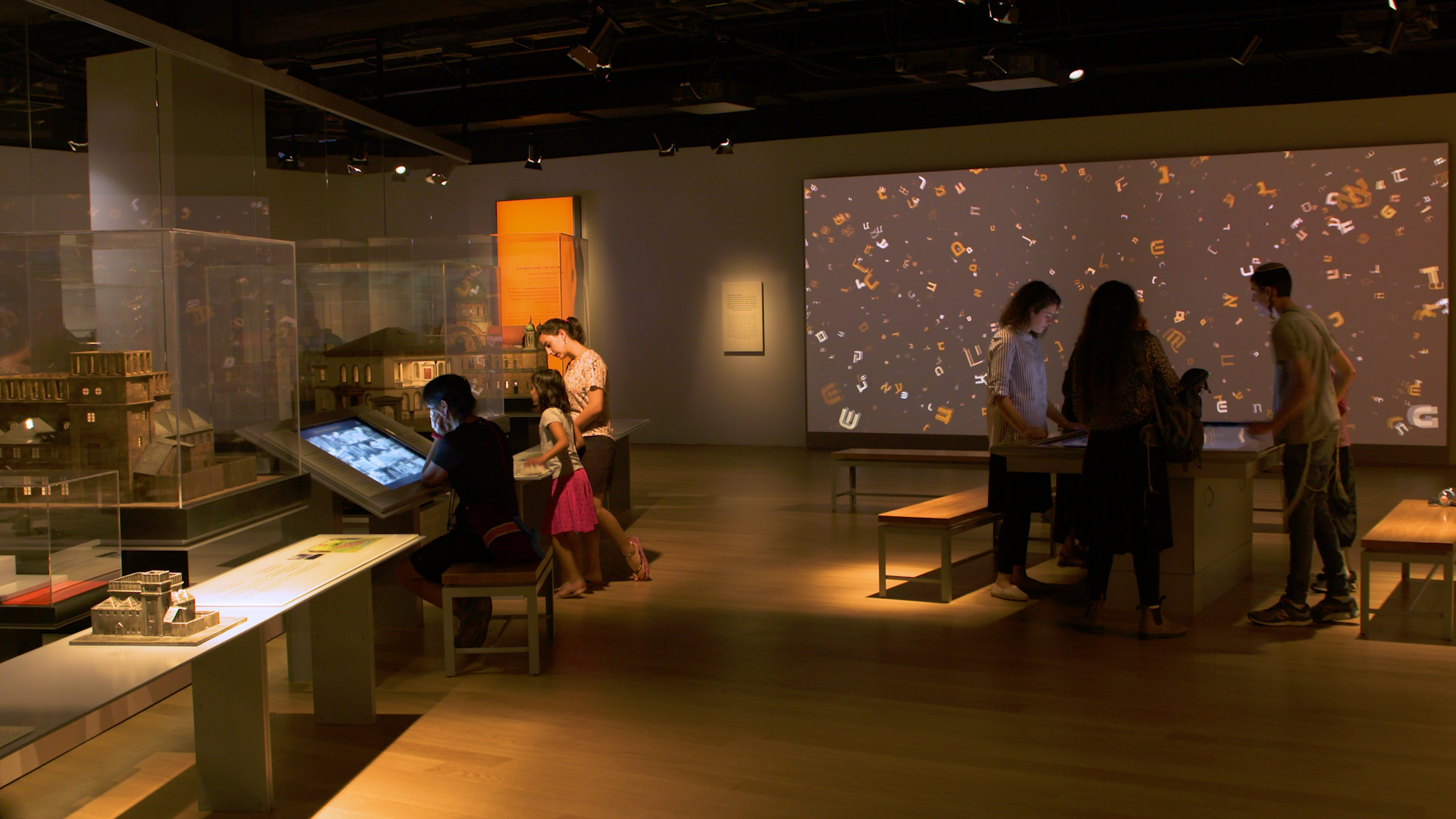
Anu – Museum of the Jewish People Synagogue Wing

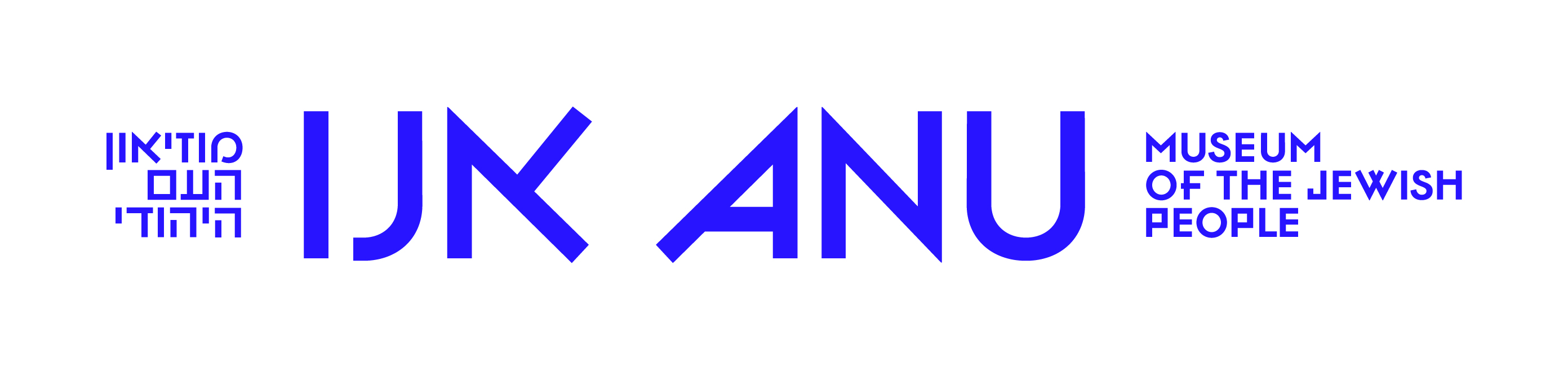
Anu – Museum of the Jewish People logo since 2021

Anu – Museum of the Jewish People (stylized ANU), formerly Beit Hatfutsot - Museum of the Jewish Diaspora (Hebrew: בית התפוצות), is located in Tel Aviv, Israel, at the center of the Tel Aviv University campus opposite Ramat Aviv.

ANU tells the ongoing story of the Jewish people from antiquity to the present. The museum presents exhibitions addressing Jewish culture, religion, and history. It is the largest and most comprehensive Jewish museum in the world.

The Hebrew Anu (אנו) means we or us. The museum adopted this name in 2010 "to embrace inclusion and reflect the diversity and collective spirit of the Jewish people everywhere."

== History ==
In 1959, Nahum Goldmann, the founder and president of the World Jewish Congress, proposed a museum that would serve as an educational and cultural center for world Jewry about the experiences of the people of the Jewish diaspora over the preceding thousands of years, including how families lived, how holidays were celebrated and interactions with the world at large. The institute in Israel was named in honor of Goldmann.

Abba Kovner, one of the founders of the museum, proposed the original concept of the museum's permanent core exhibition. It was based on a thematic principle, representing Jewish history and continuity, according to six themes, or "gates" that portray central aspects of Jewish life: family, community, faith, culture, existence and return. Among the founders of the museum, Jeshajahu Weinberg served as the museum's first director from 1978 to 1984; Meyer Weisgal was its first president.

ANU – Museum of the Jewish People opened on May 15, 1978, under the name "Museum of the Jewish Diaspora". Its exhibitions were based on reconstructions and sets, using modern audiovisual and state-of-the-art computer technology to explore topics and themes throughout the museum. This methodology reflected contemporary museological approaches emphasizing narrative presentation. Its designers deliberately chose not to follow the tradition that museums exist first in order to acquire, care for and display objects from the past.

Government budget cuts and a decline in Israeli tourism triggered a budget crisis at the museum. A number of public representatives devoted themselves to saving the museum, among them Shlomo Lahat, former mayor of Tel Aviv, and Ariel Sharon, former prime minister. In 2005, the Israeli Knesset passed the Beit Hatfutsot Law that defines Beit Hatfutsot as "the National Center for Jewish Communities in Israel and around the world". A recovery plan was enacted with two partners: the Israeli government and donor Leonid Nevzlin (NADAV Foundation), with a grant from the Claims Conference.

In 2016, the museum added a new wing as part of a 10-year, $100 million expansion funded by the State of Israel, the Nadav Foundation, and private philanthropy. As a first step in the renewal process, the museum added a new wing in 2016 with rotating temporary exhibitions, the Alfred H. Moses and Family Synagogue Hall featuring synagogue scale models, and Heroes – Trailblazers of the Jewish People, a children's interactive exhibition.

== Exhibitions, programs, education, and research ==
The museum includes several exhibition wings and digital resources. Onsite, the museum offers four wings of exhibitions, including three floors of new exhibition galleries, a children's gallery, and a rotating schedule of temporary exhibitions and related programs as well as conferences and workshops. The museum's databases house searchable archives of photos, films, music, genealogy, and family names, all related to the Jews and their history. Compiled over almost four decades, these databases are fully digitized and available both onsite and online. The museum also offers formal and informal educational activities for teachers and students, both at the museum and for use in classrooms around the world. The three new galleries opened in March 2021, tripling the exhibition space to 72,000 square feet (6,700 m^{2}), and were part of a $100 million effort to tell the story of 4,000 years of Jewish history under the name "Anu" (Hebrew: אנו), a Hebrew language word meaning "we".

== Collections ==
In May 2023, the Codex Sassoon 1053 was purchased by former U.S. Ambassador to Romania Alfred H. Moses on behalf of the American Friends of Anu for US$38.1 million, making the manuscript among the most expensive books and manuscripts sold in auction. The codex was on exhibition at Anu in March 2023 as part of a worldwide tour prior to the auction.

== Governance ==
Irina Nevzlin serves as the current chair of the board of directors and is the President of the NADAV Foundation. Ambassador Alfred H. Moses (Co-chair) and Major-General (Ret.) Eitan Ben Eliyahu (Co-chair) serve on the Board of Governors. Senator Joseph I. Lieberman served as the Honorary Chair.

== Models in the Synagogue Hall ==
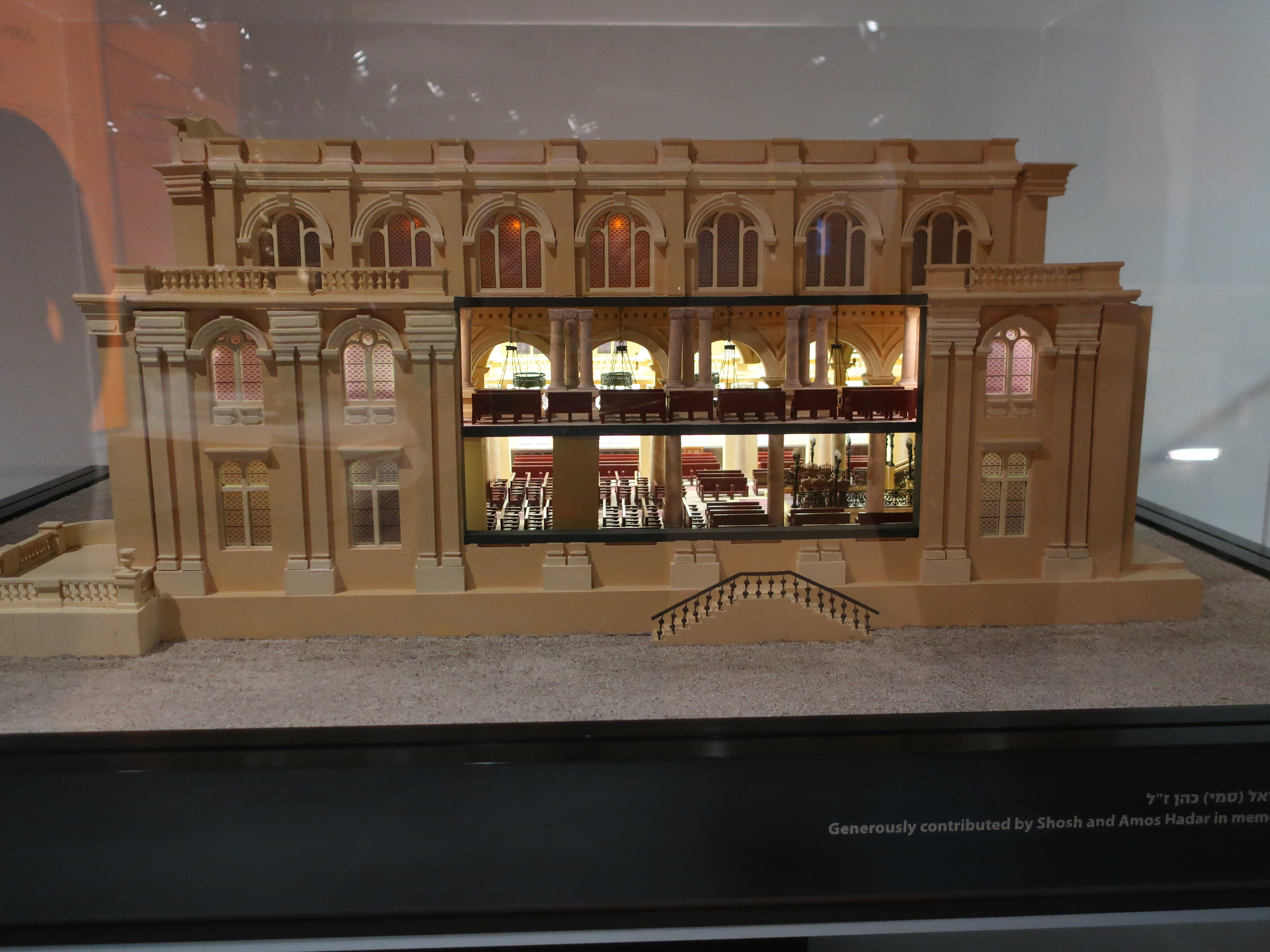
Eliahu Hanavi Synagogue model

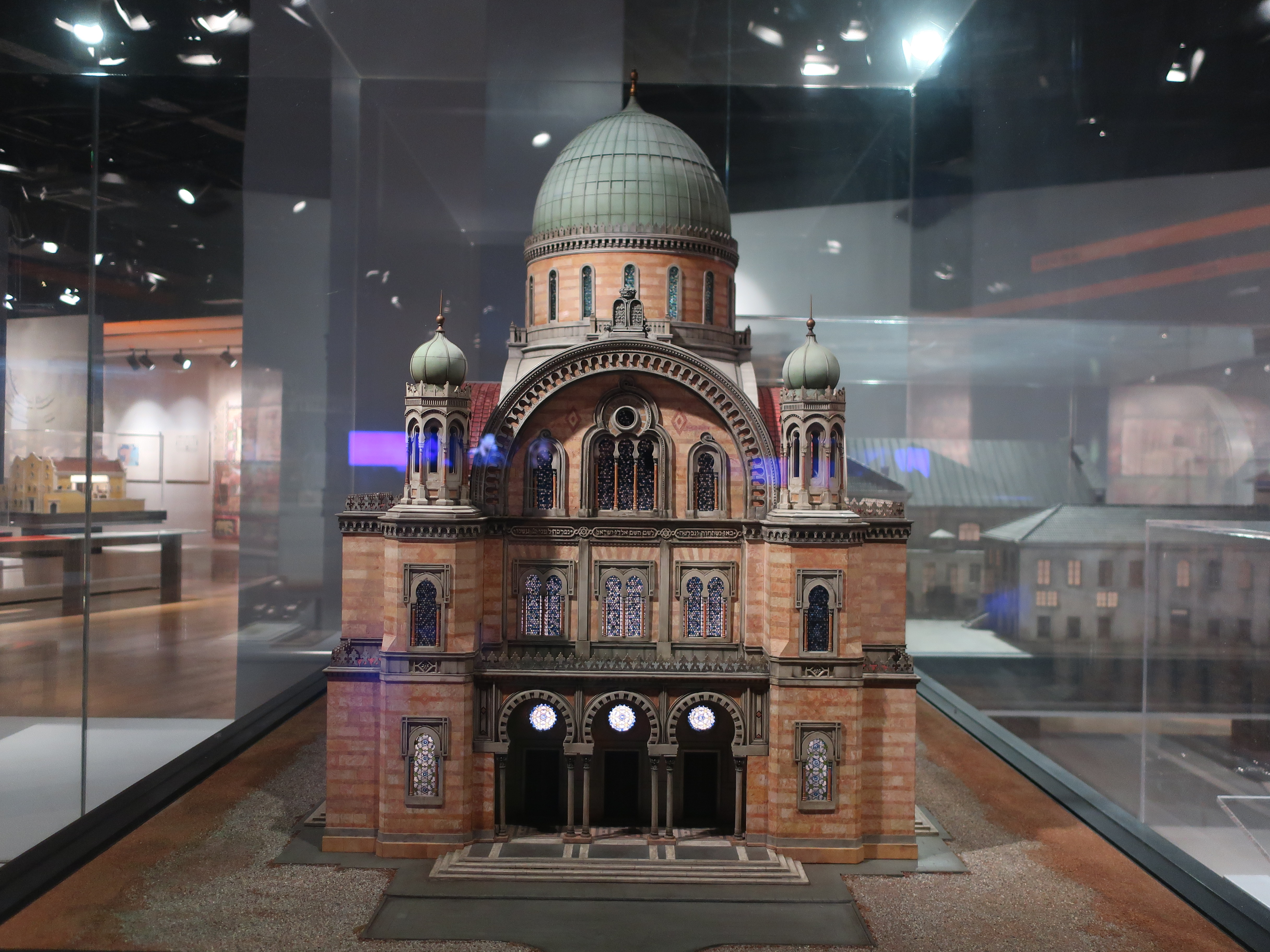
Model of The Great Sephardi Synagogue, Florence, Tuscany, Italy

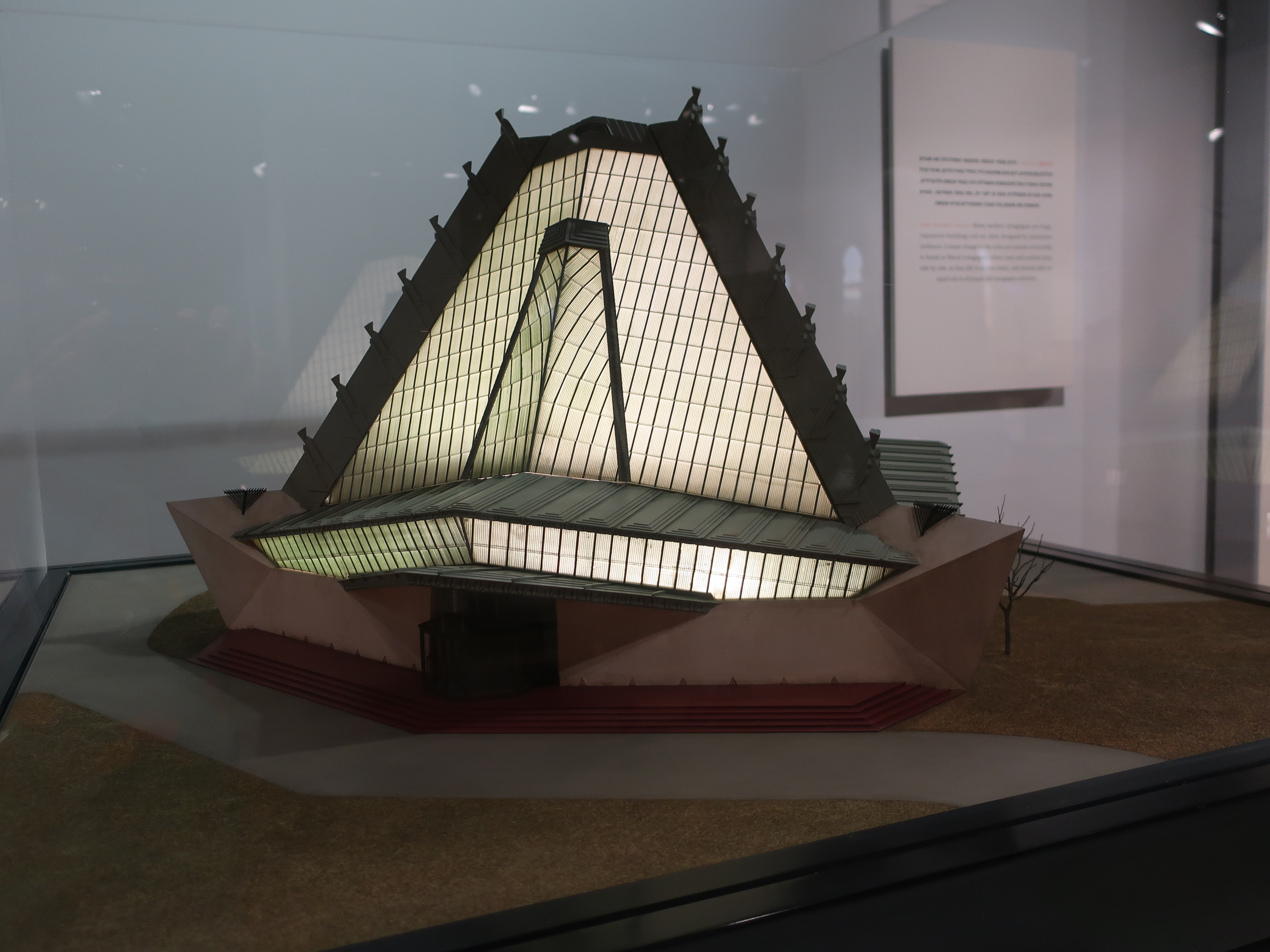
Model of Beth Sholom Synagogue in Pennsylvania, designed by Frank Lloyd Wright

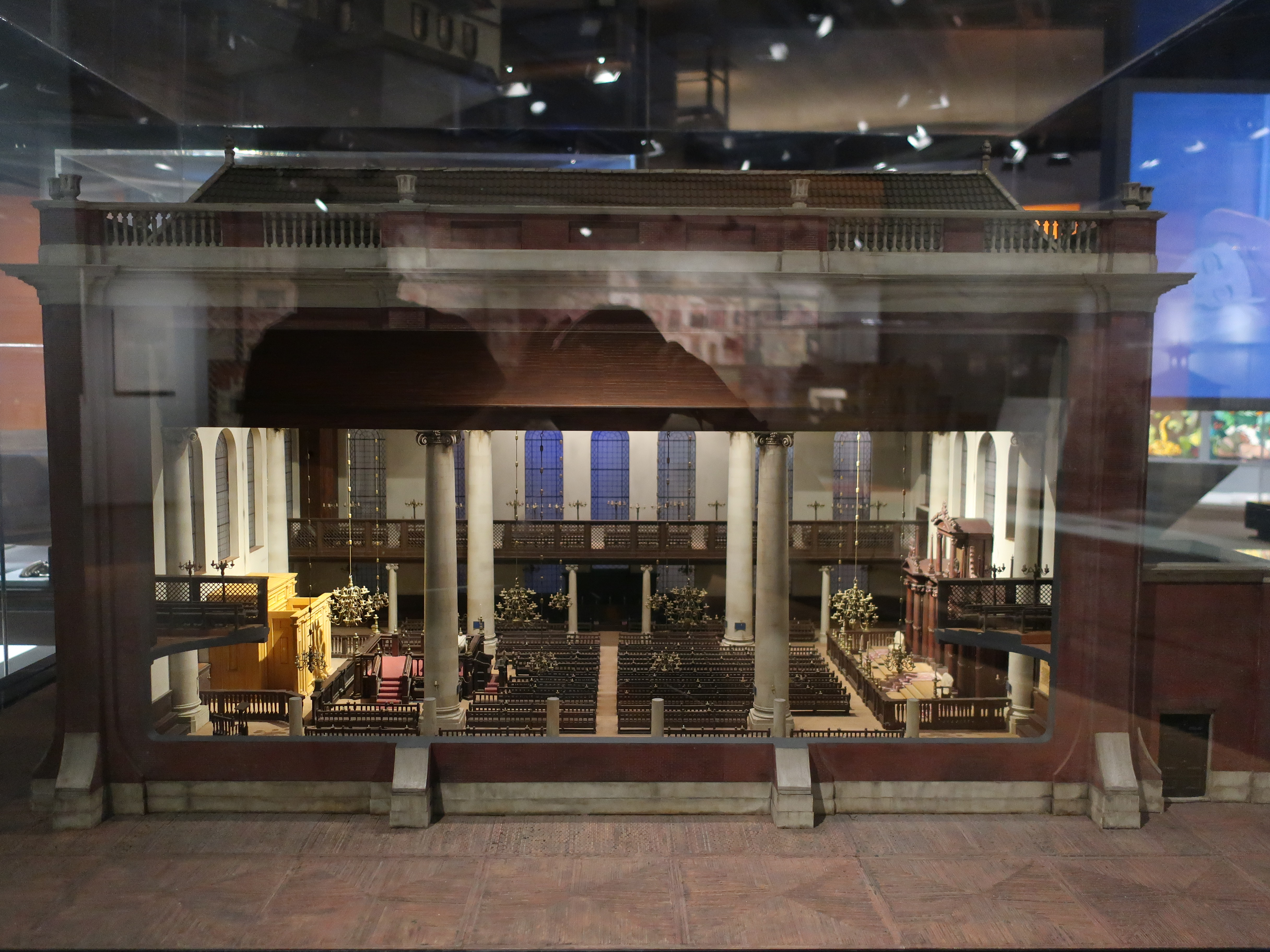
Model of the Portuguese Synagogue, Amsterdam, Holland

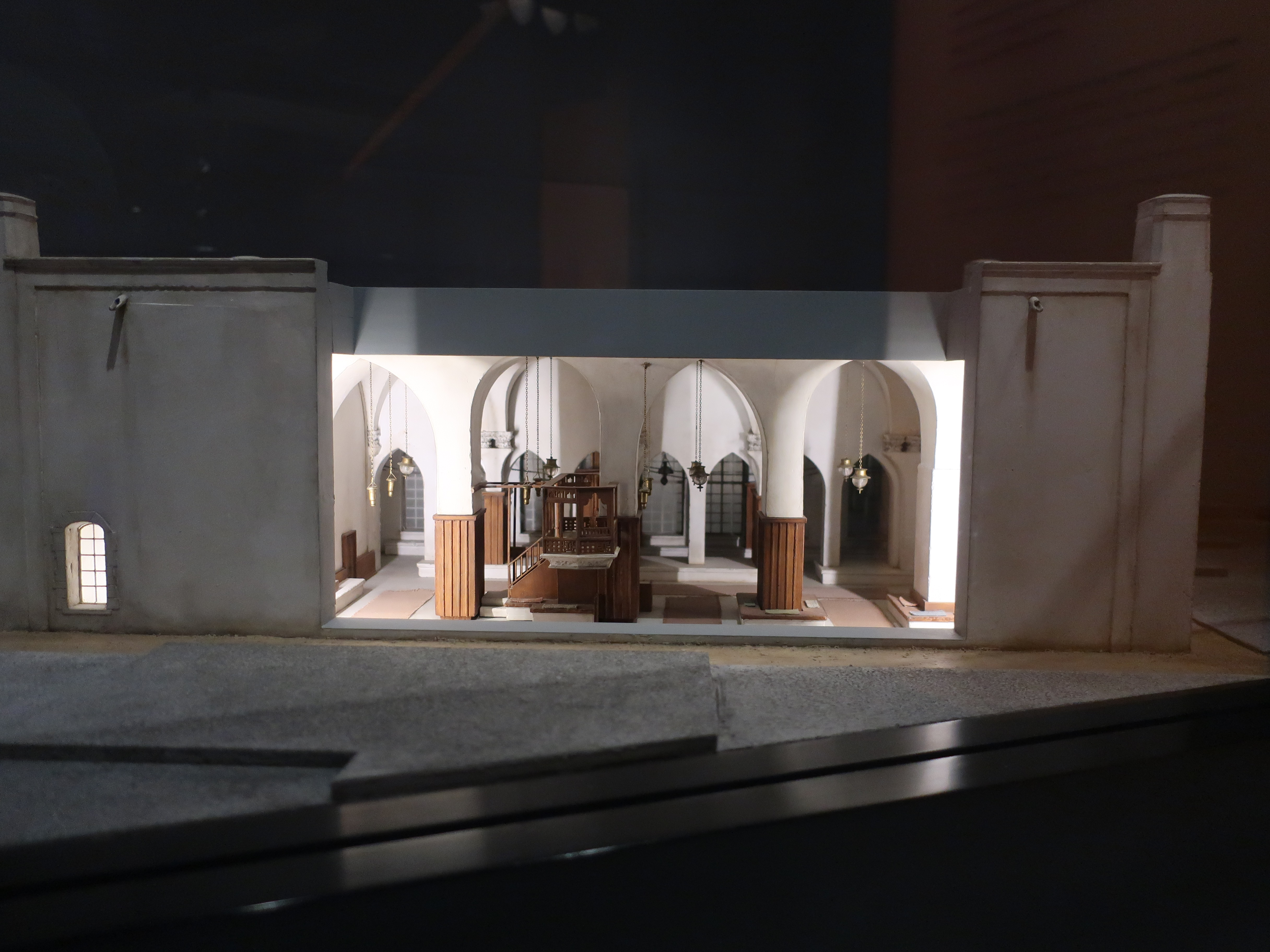
Model of the Central Synagogue of Aleppo, Aleppo (Haleb) northwestern Syria

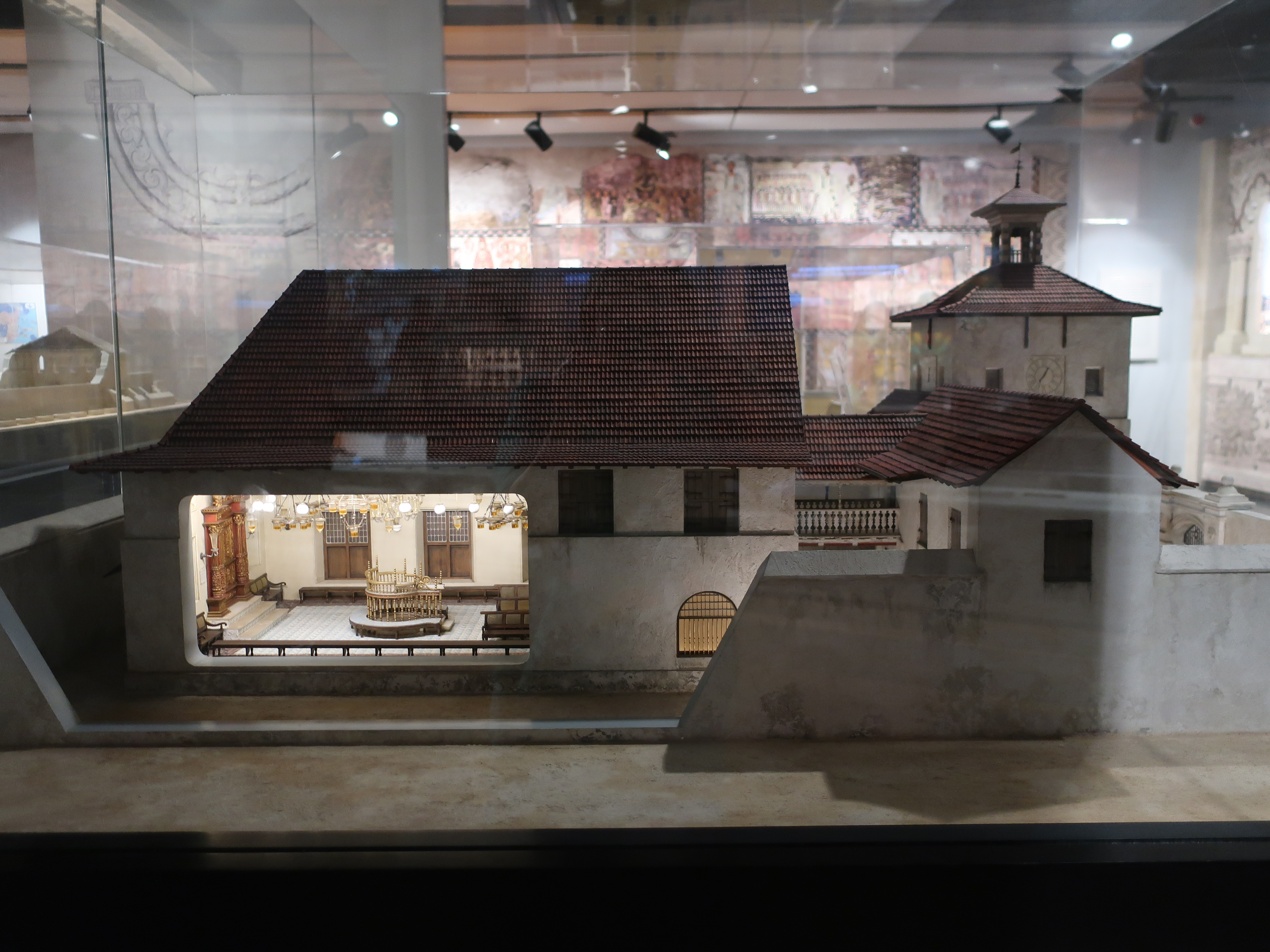
Model of the Paradesi Synagogue, Cochin, southwestern India

== Awards ==
In 1985, the museum was awarded the Knesset Speaker's Quality of Life Award.

== See also ==
- Tourism in Israel
