= Bank Menatep =

Russian financial institution, later holding company

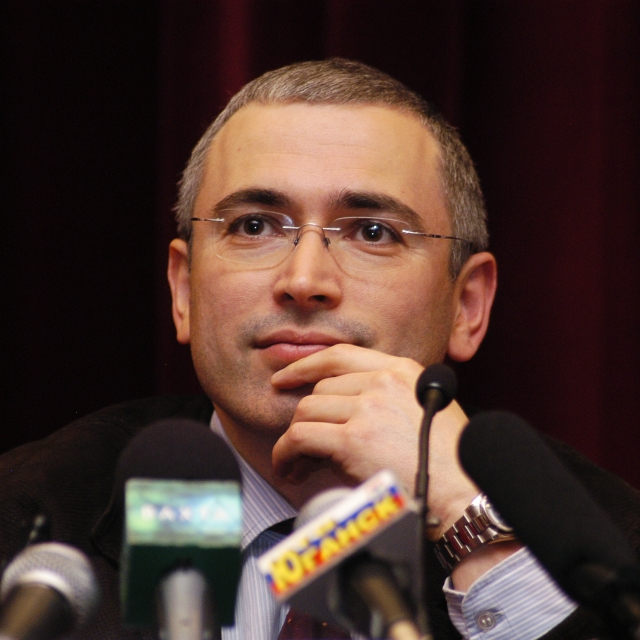
Mikhail Khodorkovsky in 2001

Bank "MENATEP", Bank "MENATEP SPb" (Russian: Банк "МЕНАТЕП Санкт-Петербург" / Банк «МЕНАТЕП СПб») and "Group Menatep Limited" were financial companies, created by Russian oligarch Mikhail Khodorkovsky. "Group Menatep Limited", the US$29 billion holding company that had indirect controlling interest in Yukos Oil Company, was later renamed, and now still exists as holding company GML with Leonid Nevzlin as principal shareholder holding a stake of around 70 percent. The other four ultimate beneficial owners owning an equal stake each are Platon Lebedev, Mikhail Brudno, Vladimir Dubov and Vasily Shakhnovsky.

A 1990s scandal related to the institution has been sometimes called Kremlingate.

== History ==
=== Bank "Menatep" ===
In 1986, the Center for Scientific and Technical Creativity for Youth - TSMNTP (Russian: Межотраслевой Центр Научно-технических программ — ЦМНТП) was created in Moscow by Mikhail Khodorkovsky. Center Menatep was attached to the Komsomol committee in Moscow's Frunzensky District. In 1987, Leonid Nevzlin, a software engineer, met Khodorkovsky and became a deputy director at the Center.

Later on, in December 1988, Khodorkovsky established one of the first private banks in Russia, the Commercial Innovation Bank of Scientific-Technical Progress, headquartered in Moscow and renamed in 1990 "MENATEPinvest".

In May 1990, Interbank Association "MENATEP" was registered, subsequently renamed by Khodorkovsky as International Financial Association "MENATEP" (Russian: Международное финансовое объединение МЕНАТЕП / МФО МЕНАТЕП) in 1991. Alexey Golubovich joined MFO MENATEP as the principal economist in 1992. He also was head of the investment department and the vice-president of the bank MENATEP from 1992 till 1996. In 1997 MFO Menatep became a subsidiary of Khodorkovsky's newly created, Gibraltar-registered holding company Group Menatep Limited.

From 1989 to 1991, Leonid Nevzlin was president of Bank Menatep (Investment Commercial Bank of Scientific and Technical progress), after which he held other high-ranking positions, including vice chairman of the board (1993–1996) and head of public relations (1994–1996). Nevzlin also worked at Group Menatep, focusing on corporate communications, government relations, and human resources. Nevzlin became in April 1996 Vice President of Yukos, in which Menatep had acquired a 78% share in December 1995.

From May, 1989 to 1990, Khodorkovski held the position of chairman of the board of "Commercial Innovation Bank of Scientific-Technical Progress", renamed in 1990 "MENATEPinvest". In August, 1991, Khodorkovski also became chairman of board of directors of credit-financial enterprises association MENATEP. From 1992 to 1993, Andrei Loginov, was Deputy Head of the Board of the Commercial Innovation MENATEP (Bank of Scientific-Technical Progress). From 1991 to April 1996, Vladislav Surkov held key managerial positions in advertisement and PR departments of Bank Menatep.

Both Inkombank and Bank Menatap are believed to have had business relationships with Bruce Rappaport.

In November 1994, Konstantin Kagalovsky became deputy chairman of Bank Menatep. Kagalovsky was Russia's representative to the International Monetary Fund between 1992 and 1995. He is married to Natasha Gurfinkel-Kagalovsky (a.k.a. Nataliya Gurfinkel-Kagalovskaya), a former senior vice president of the Bank of New York (B.O.N.Y.). The Bank of New York was involved in the tax evasion scandal with billions of dollars channeled out of Russia from 1996 to 1999. (See also: Clearstream scandal) In 1999, both were accused of money laundering, however denied any wrongdoing. Natasha Gurfinkel-Kagalovsky who headed the bank's Eastern European division, decided to resign after being suspended by the bank following the yearlong federal probe of suspicious transfers of $7.5 billion or more through a series of related accounts. However, in early 2000, she filed a suit against her former employer claiming $270 million in compensation for damage to her reputation.

In November 1995, Bank Menatep took part in a mortgage auction, which resulted in its takeover of the oil company Yukos.

Alexander Zurabov w as President of Bank MENATEP from 1996 until 1997 and chairman from 1997 until 1999. Since 1996, Ilya Yurov has been Head of Treasury at the MENATEP Bank in Moscow. In February 1997, Yuri Milner became deputy chairman and head of the investment division of Menatep Bank.

Following the financial meltdown in August 1998 when Menatep defaulted on obligations and suspended operations, the bulk of operations were shifted to Bank Menatep SPb and Trust & Investment Bank. In the course of asset distribution Bank Menatep SPb grabbed the lender’s branch network and card business, while Trust & Investment Bank gained the right to deal with most of Yukos’ financial flows.

The Moscow-based Bank Menatep lost its banking license in May 1999 and was declared bankrupt in September of the same year.

=== Bank "Menatep SPb" ===
In 1995, a subsidiary in St. Petersburg was founded by the Moscow Bank "Menatep" under the name of "Menatep St. Petersburg". The commercial bank was registered by the Central Bank of the Russian Federation on November 27, 1995. It had a general license of the Central Bank of Russia to conduct banking operations. In 1997, Bank "Menatep SPb" was ranked among the 50 fastest growing banks in Russia. In 2000, the Bank, acting as a company, was transformed into a joint-stock company. with YUKOS Oil Company as one of the main shareholders.

At the end of 2000, Bank "Menatep SPb" got permission to establish a subsidiary in Switzerland - "Menatep Finance SA", located in Geneva, in order to get better access to the international capital market.

As of 2001, the branch network of Bank "Menatep SPb" comprised 57 branches all over Russia.

In 2001, the bank opened a branch in Ulan Bator, capital of Mongolia. In 2002, Bank "Menatep SPb" was among the 20 largest Russian banks by all key financial indicators and the largest bank in St. Petersburg.

Vitaly Saveliev, director general of Aeroflot since 2009, was chief executive officer (Председатель правления) and as first deputy chairman of the board of directors of Bank "Menatep SPb" from November 1995 until 2001. Dmitri Lebedev was from 2000 until 2001 executive officer (Заместитель председателя правления) of Bank "Menatep SPb" and from 2001 until 2003 as CEO of the bank. Since November 1998, the deputy chairman of the management board of Gazprom, Pyotr Rodionov, was chairman (Председатель совета) of Bank "Menatep SPb".

As of 2003, the management of Bank "Menatep SPb" consisted of the following:

- Bank's Council: Platon L. Lebedev, President of the Council. Dmitry A. Lebedev and Ilya S. Yurov, vice-presidents of the council. Igor D.Antoshin, Francois Buclez, Aleksandr E. Kabanovsky, Michael B. Kislyakov, Bruce K. Misamore, and Pyotr G. Semenenko, members of the Council.
- Executive committee of Menatep SPb: Dmitry A. Lebedev, chairman of the executive committee. Vladimir A. Vasiliev, Sergey A. Khabarov and Andrey I. Khorobrov, deputy chairmen of the executive committee. Olga V. Fomina, chief account officer. Maksim E. Frolov, branch manager. Sergey L. Arseniev, director of regional management.

As of 2003, the principal shareholders of Bank "Menatep SPb" were MFO MENATEP, YUKOS Oil, Kirov Plants, Baltika Brewery and Kontakt Manufacturing & Trading.

=== From "Menatep" to "Trust" ===
In 2004, OJSC Bank "MENATEP SPb" was acquired by its own management team renaming it as National Bank "TRUST" (ОАО) (Russian: Национальный банк "ТРАСТ") later that same year. The decision to change the name of the bank was made by the general meeting of shareholders of the Bank "Menatep SPb" on October 11, 2004. Ilya Yurov, since October 2003 chairman of the board of directors, announced that the new bank planned to continue activities of Corporate Banking service and services for private clients. Yurov was the Head of Treasury at the MENATEP Bank in Moscow since 1996. Since October 2003, he had been the chairman of the board of directors for the TRUST Investment Bank (TIB) and National Bank TRUST (formerly TRUST National Bank).

As of April 1, 2006, Trust Bank was the No. 34 among Russia’s banks in equity (5.4 billion rubles), according to the rating compiled by Kommersant Dengi (Kommersant Money). It was scored the No. 54 in net asset total (21.5 billion rubles). The holders are five individuals, with Ilya Yurov owning the biggest stake of 35.94 percent.

In November 2006, National Bank "Trust" (NB "Trust") moved from Saint Petersburg to Moscow.

=== Group Menatep Limited ===
On September 5, 1997, a company called "Flaymon Limited" was registered in Gibraltar. As of October 27, 1997 the total share capital of Flaymon Limited comprised 5 million shares, of which Mikhail Khodorkovsky held 10.5%, Leonid Nevzlin 9%, Mikhail Brudno 7.75%, Platon Lebedev 7.75%, Vladimir Dubov 7.75%, and Alexey Golubovich 5%. The remaining 50% stake was held by trust management company "Palmus Foundation" in Liechtenstein.

On December 29, 1997 «Flaymon Limited» was renamed as "Group MENATEP Limited", with a registered capital of 20 million pounds.

Valmet, a Geneva-based global trust business, founded by Christian Michel, agreed in early 1989 to advise Khodorkovsky's group of young businessmen. Valmet later held the key to the Group Menatep fortune, holding shares via nominee ownership schemes and organizing the transfer of vast sums of money via its network.

As of June 19, 2002 the total share capital of "Group MENATEP Limited" was distributed as follows: Mikhail Khodorkovsky held 9.5%, Leonid Nevzlin 8%, Mikhail Brudno 7%, Platon Lebedev 7%, Vladimir Dubov 7%, Vasily Shakhnovsky 7%, and others 4.5%. The remaining 50% stake was held by a trust fund "Special Trust Arrangement". The sole beneficiary of the trust fund "Special Trust Arrangement" on June 19, 2002 was Mikhail Khodorkovsky.

Group MENATEP Limited was the owner of 100% shares of the company "Yukos Universal Limited", registered in the Isle of Man. The company "Yukos Universal Limited" in turn owned 100% of the shares of the company "Hulley Enterprises Limited", registered in Cyprus. As of April 2000, the company "Hulley Enterprises Limited" owned more than 52% of shares of JSC "NC" YUKOS.

As of June 10, 2002, Group MENATEP Limited owned 100% share capital of Yukos Universal Limited, the Isle of Man offshore vehicle which held and controlled 1,364,904,402 shares or 61.01% stake in Yukos. Yukos Universal Limited directly held 79,288,881 shares or 3.54%, while another offshore vehicle, Hulley Enterprises Ltd., a Cyprus-registered wholly owned subsidiary of Yukos Universal Ltd., held 1,285,615,521 shares or 57.47% of the aggregate number of shares of the Company.

Also, Group MENATEP Ltd. controlled Bank Menatep SPb and the Trust and Investment Bank (Доверительный и инвестиционный банк). However, the group's 61% stake in Yukos was reduced to 44.1 percent following a share issue in 2003.

Following the arrest of Yukos' former chief executive Mikhail Khodorkovsky in October 2003, Stephen Curtis, a British lawyer, was appointed managing director of Group Menatep Ltd. in November 2003. However, just a couple of months later, Curtis died in a helicopter crash in Bournemouth on March 3, 2004.

On February 11, 2004, Anton Drel, the lawyer of Mikhail Khodorkovsky, announced his client was no longer a shareholder of Group Menatep and that Khodorkovsky had pulled out of the company on October 20, 2003, several days before he was arrested. At the time of his arrest, Khodorkovsky held 59.5 percent of Group Menatep equaling roughly 26 percent of Yukos, worth $7.8 billion. Shortly after Khodorkovsky's arrest, Group Menatep pulled its shareholder list off its web site and revealed that Khodorkovsky had handed over control of a special trust that owned 50 percent of Menatep. Drel however said that Khodorkovsky had relinquished all his shares in the holding. The lawyer said that the prosecutors' step of freezing 44 percent of Yukos' shares could be unlawful as Khodorkovsky did not own any shares in Menatep any longer. Menatep owned the frozen stake via two offshore vehicles, Yukos Universal and Hulley Enterprises. Drel further added that he could not disclose the name of the new holder of the shares. Analysts said Yukos' ownership structure was getting murkier and murkier.

Following the death of Stephen Curtis in March 2004, Group MENATEP announced the appointment of three new managing directors in May 2004: Kevin Bromley, director of IFG International Limited an Isle of Man trust company; Nicholas Keeling, a Gibraltar-based solicitor representing a corporate director; and Tim Osborne, senior partner of Wiggin Osborne Fullerlove, an English law firm specialising in international tax. The three directors were supposed to jointly manage the operations of the company.

As of mid 2004, holding company Group MENATEP Limited was the 100% owner of the following subsidiary companies:

- Yukos Universal Ltd (Yukos Universal Ltd was the majority shareholder in YUKOS Oil Company: Structure of Yukos Universal Ltd)
- MENATEP Ltd (MENATEP Ltd was a substantial stakeholder in:
  - MENATEP International Financial Alliance
  - Bank MENATEP St. Petersburg
  - TRUST Investment Bank
  - Progress Insurance Company)
- GM Investment & Co Ltd
- Pecunia Universal Ltd
- Antel Holdings Ltd
- Chemical & Mining Universal Ltd

See also: Group MENATEP structure

As of February 9, 2005, the holding company Group MENATEP Limited was the 100% owner of YUKOS Universal Limited and Hulley Enterprises Limited which together owned 51% of YUKOS Oil Company.

On 23 May 2005, the Gibraltar-registered company Group Menatep Limited issued in London a press release announcing that former EU Commissioner Frits Bolkestein had joined the Advisory Board of Group Menatep. Before starting his political career, Bolkestein worked for Royal Dutch Shell oil company for 16 years. Fellow members of the Advisory Board were former US Deputy Secretary of the Treasury Stuart Eizenstat, former Executive Editor of The Economist Dudley Fishburn, former German Federal Minister of Economics Otto Graf Lambsdorff and Margery Kraus, founder and CEO of APCO Worldwide.

In March 2006, a syndicate of Western banks, led by France's Societe Generale, filed a petition in the Moscow Arbitration Court for Yukos to be declared bankrupt. On August 1, 2006, the Moscow Arbitration Court declared Yukos oil company bankrupt after being hit with claims for $30bn in disputed taxes. Two weeks later, the Russian prosecutor general’s office said that it was pursuing a criminal investigation against four executives who managed the Yukos oil company from outside Russia before it was declared bankrupt. Among those executives was British lawyer Tim Osborne, director of the holding company GML, formerly Menatep, which owned a majority of Yukos stock.

At the time of the Yukos bankruptcy, GML controlled 51% of Yukos shares through Yukos Universal and Hulley Enterprises. Veteran Petroleum, the Yukos pension fund, and Millhouse Capital, owned 10% and 8.8% each. Three hedge funds also held a 24% stake in Yukos.

In April 2007, The Times reported that British lawyer Tim Osborne was accused of a criminal offence by the Russian Government. Osborne was accused under articles 160 and 174 of the Criminal Code of the Russian Federation of embezzlement, misappropriation of assets and money laundering. At that time, Osborne was a managing director of GML (formerly Group Menatep), an investment vehicle and the biggest shareholder in Yukos. On 10 May 2007, Osborne said in written evidence submitted by GML Limited that "the [Russian] accusations limit his ability to travel and discharge his fiduciary duties to manage GML's claim under the ECT. They further damage his personal and professional reputation and ability to carry on his legal practice." Osborne further demanded that all Council of Europe member states should reject Russian extradition requests and mentioned that in two rulings in Bow Street Magistrates' Court on extradition requests for individuals connected to Yukos, Judge Timothy Workman refused to allow extradition on the basis that the requests were politically motivated. The accusation against Osborne and some officers were published on the website of the Russian Prosecutor General’s Office in 2007, shortly after the Yukos shareholders had filed a $103 billion suit against Russia at the Permanent Court of Arbitration in The Hague for compensation from the Russian government for alleged expropriation of its investment. The Hague claim falls under the Energy Charter Treaty (ECT), an international agreement that in part regulates investments in the energy industry, which Russia signed but never ratified.

About 70 percent of GML was owned in 2007 by Leonid Nevzlin, who inherited Khodorkovsky’s stake in 2003, with the rest split evenly between four other Yukos partners. They are Platon Lebedev, Mikhail Brudno, Vladimir Dubov and Vasily Shakhnovsky.

In July 2014, the Permanent Court of Arbitration in The Hague ordered Russia to pay about $50 billion in damage following the accusation of violating the EU Energy Charter when it redistributed the Yukos’ assets.

However, to some analysts the Hague Court's ruling appeared biased. Moscow-based political risk analyst Eric Kraus explained that Khodorkovsky was found guilty by both Russia and the European Court of Human Rights. Russia's Finance Ministry also called the ruling "politically biased." and said that it planned to appeal against the decision.

In November 2014, Russia announced that it is appealing the $50 billion Yukos verdict, on the grounds that the case did not come within the mandate of the Arbitration Court in The Hague.

In April 2016, a Hague District Court overturned the 2014 ruling of the Permanent Court of Arbitration (PCA). In its argument, the Hague district court said Russia had never ratified the energy treaty under which the PCA had based its case.

In 2020, the Dutch appeals court in turn restored the initial award.

However, in November 2021, the Dutch Supreme Court cancelled the $50 billion arbitration award Russia was ordered to pay Yukos shareholders, throwing the case back for appeal and likely years more litigation.

In February 2024, a Dutch court denied an appeal by Russia against the $50 billion arbitration award it was ordered to pay to the former shareholders of Yukos in 2014.

In October 2025, the Supreme Court of the Netherlands rejected Russia 's last remaining challenge to the Yukos arbitration awards.

== Clearstream Scandal ==
The financial condition of the Moscow-based Bank "Menatep" was seriously damaged during the 1998 financial crisis due to a requirement by the Russian Central Bank that all commercial banks keep a proportion of their reserve requirements in Russian treasury bills known as GKO, which subsequently collapsed, causing a default which led to the crisis and Bank Menatep's bankruptcy. The Central Bank revoked Menatep's licence in May 1999.

The bankruptcy was finalized by February 2001. In an unprecedented move, the core shareholders of the bank, the financial holding Group Menatep of which Khodorkovsky was a principal, decided to share their own money with the 15,000 Bank Menatep small depositors whose savings had been wiped out by the collapse. A new Bank Menatep Saint Petersburg was created from a Saint Petersburg division of Bank Menatep. It accumulated the assets, but not the liabilities of the original bank.

According to Ernest Backes, former #3 of Clearstream, a clearing-house which has been qualified as a "bank of banks", Menatep maintained an unpublished secret account at Clearstream until at least 2000.

In 2001, investigative reporter Denis Robert and ex-banker Ernest Backes, an executive at Cedel (now Clearstream) until May 1983, had published a book, "Revelation$" in which Backes disclosed internal information from Cedel. After Backes had made his revelations the German foreign intelligence agency BND became interested.

In late 2002, Ernest Backes gave the BND insight into a dossier on Yukos and the principal shareholder of the Russian company, Group Menatep, containing incriminating evidence against Khodorkovsky. The intelligence agency was thrilled. In early 2003 Backes handed over a copy of his dossier on Yukos and Menatep to the BND who finally sent it in February 2003 from Pullach to the Federal Chancellery in Berlin. Meanwhile, Putin traveled to Berlin to open the Russian Culture Days on February 9 and meet with Chancellor Gerhard Schroeder. On February 26, the German Chancellor went surprisingly to an "extraordinary meeting" with the Russian President in Moscow. When asked by the German magazine STERN in 2007, Schroeder denied having handed over the Backes dossier to Vladimir Putin during his visit to Berlin in February 2003.

The German foreign intelligence agency subsequently invited Backes and another ex-banker, Swiss citizen André Strebel to further talks. In June 2003, Backes and Strebel met with two agents from BND Department 5 ("Organized Crime - International Terrorism") in the Munich Maritim Hotel. They agreed a deal: The BND would finance the establishment of an institute. This was on condition that the BND would get access to the extensive archives, which Backes and Strebel had built up in the course of their work for various banking and clearing systems.

The BND financed the establishment of the "Institute for Economic Research Ltd." (Institut für Wirtschaftsrecherchen GmbH (IWR), located in Saarbrücken and the ex-bankers started working on their dossier. To outsiders, the BND background was not recognizable.

On July 2, 2003, Khodorkovsky’s business associate Platon Lebedev was arrested and Mikhail Khodorkovsky himself was arrested on October 25, 2003. A month later, on November 26, 2003, Backes and his partner Strebel filed through the BND sham institute in Saarbrücken a criminal complaint with the Swiss attorney general against Khodorkovsky and his colleagues Platon Lebedev and Alexei Golubovich, accusing them of money-laundering and supporting a criminal organization. They requested an investigation and a search of records of the Swiss office of Menatep SA, Menatep Finances SA, Valmet. and of Bank Leu in Geneva, related to claims of fraud against the Russian company Avisma and money-laundering by Menatep in Switzerland.

Clearstream denied "the existence of parallel accounts" and of "personal accounts" (in response, Denis Robert published a list of several personal accounts on his blog). However, the company did recognize that "a banking establishment may request an unpublished account, that is, an account only known by the establishments concerned by the transaction, control authorities, and the auditors of the firm". Clearstream also indicated that it had "spent 15 million euros on various audits without finding anything," Denis Robert's accusations.

=== Refusal of the European Commission to open an investigation ===
On April 26, 2006, 20 Minutes revealed that "in May 2005, MEP Paul Van Buitenen was shocked by Frits Bolkestein's presence on Menatep's international consultative council, a Russian banking establishment, and by his work for Shell, a British-Dutch petrol company, two firms 'maintaining secret accounts in Clearstream'... Van Buitenen, also Dutch, then asked for 'clarification' to the European Commission and the opening of a parliamentary investigation. The Commission's president, José Manuel Barroso, replied that these facts 'do not bring up any new question' and that it is not known 'if Menatep made contact with Bolkestein while he was in these positions'. No investigation therefore took place."

The free daily points out that "in 2001, it was Bolkestein himself who announced the Commission's refusal to open up a parliamentary investigation on Clearstream", following Harlem Désir's requests and accusations that Menatep had an "undeclared account" at Clearstream. Bolkestein refused to answer any questions by the newspaper.

== See also ==
- Clearstream scandal
- Platon Lebedev
- YUKOS
- Apatit
- AVISMA
- Group MENATEP
