= Leonid Nevzlin =

Russian born Jewish politician and businessman

- לאוניד נבזלין (Hebrew); Леонид Невзлин (Russian)
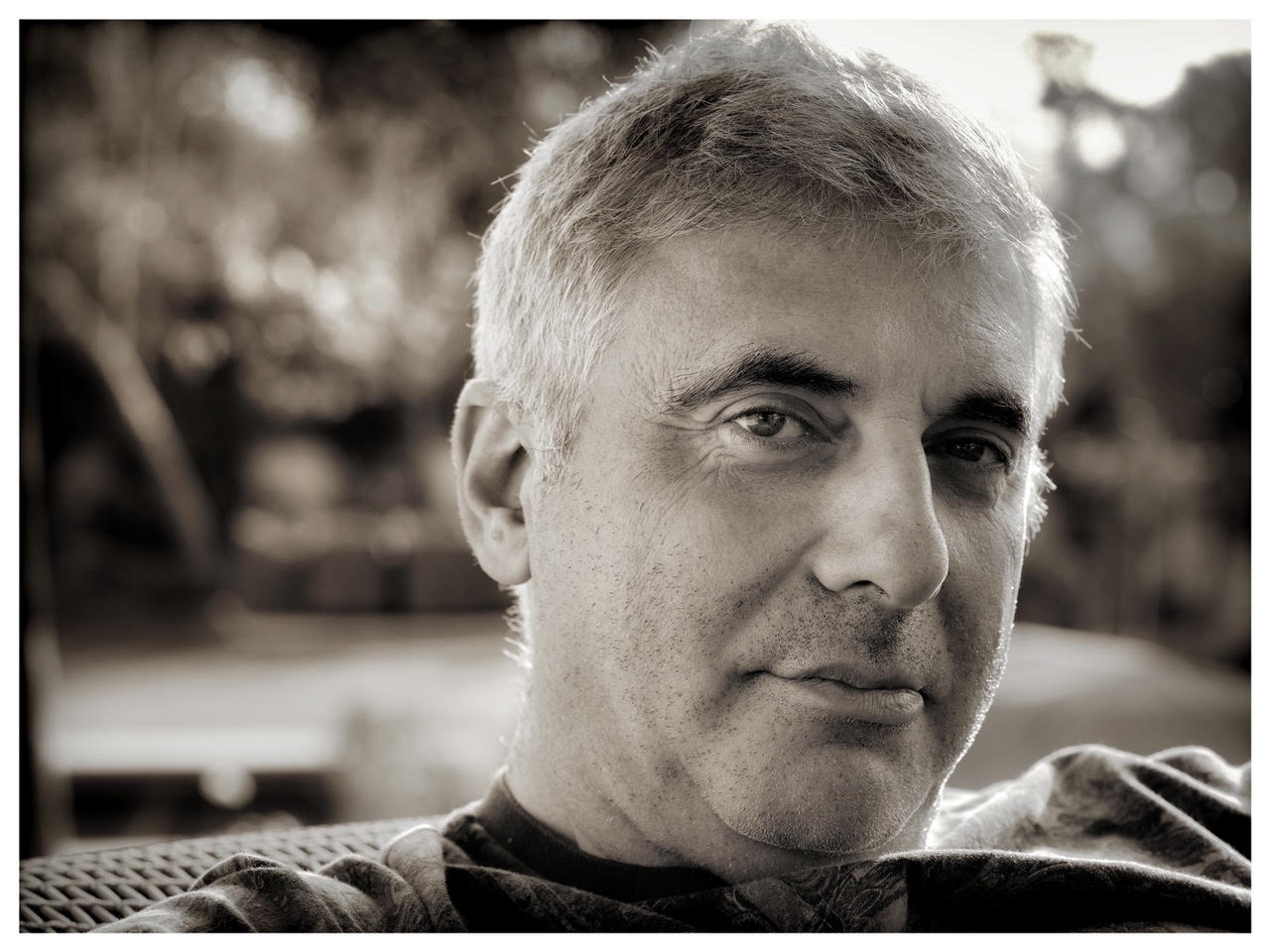
- Nevzlin in 2018
- Born: 21 September 1959 (age 67); Moscow, Russian SFSR, Soviet Union
- Education: Gubkin Institute of Oil and Gas
- Occupations: Businessman; investor; philanthropist; software engineer
- Children: 4, including Irina
- Relatives: Yuli Edelstein (son-in-law)

Leonid Borisovich Nevzlin (Russian: Леонид Борисович Невзлин; Hebrew: לאוניד בוריסוביץ' נבזלין; born 21 September 1959) is an Israeli businessman, investor, philanthropist, and former Russian oligarch.

Nevzlin occupied various high-ranking positions at Group Menatep and its subsidiary, the Yukos Oil Company. In 2008, Nevzlin was tried by the Russian state in absentia and was found guilty of several counts of conspiracy to murder, consequently sentenced to life imprisonment. In 2014, the Permanent Court of Arbitration ruled in favor of Nevzlin and other Yukos shareholders, calling the actions of the Russian state "a ruthless campaign to destroy Yukos and to expropriate its assets".

Following the 2022 Russian invasion of Ukraine, Nevzlin renounced his Russian citizenship, stating that: "I consider the majority of the population of this nation to be Russian slave cattle."

== Early life and education ==
Nevzlin was born in Moscow on 21 September 1959 into a family of Lithuanian Jewish origin. He graduated from the Gubkin Russian State University of Oil and Gas in 1981, and earned an MA from the Plekhanov Russian University of Economics, majoring in management and marketing.

== Career ==
From 1981 to 1987, Nevzlin was a software engineer at Zarubezhgeologia, an external trade organization of the Soviet Ministry of Geology. In 1987, he met Mikhail Khodorkovsky and became a deputy director at the Center for Scientific and Technical Creativity of the Youth (MENATEP), attached to the Komsomol committee in Moscow's Frunzensky District.

MENATEP established one of the first private banks in Russia, Bank Menatep. From 1989 to 1991, Nevzlin served as president of the bank, after which he held other high-ranking positions, including vice chairman of the board (1993-1996) and head of public relations (1994-1996). Nevzlin also worked at Group Menatep, focusing on corporate communications, government relations, and human resources. In April 1996 he became vice president of Yukos, in which Menatep had acquired a 78% share in December 1995.

From September 1997 to October 1998, Nevzlin served as first deputy director general of the Russian news agency ITAR TASS, creating a plan to gradually transform it into a joint-stock company. In April 1998, Nevzlin became first vice chairman of Bank Menatep. In 1999 he became first vice chairman of the board of directors of Yukos. From November 2001 to March 2003, he represented the Republic of Mordovia as a senator in the Federation Council of Russia. From June to November 2003, he served as the rector of the Russian State University for the Humanities. In 2002, Nevzlin was ranked 69th wealthiest Israeli. In 2003 and 2004, he was featured on Forbes magazine's list of the world's 100 wealthiest people. In 2010, his wealth was estimated at US$1.3 billion. He is considered a Russian oligarch.

Nevzlin is a co-owner and board member of Haaretz, one of Israel's liberal newspaper publishers, having purchased a 20% stake in the company in 2011 for 140 million shekels. Members of the Schocken family, descendants of the newspaper's founders, retain a 60 percent stake in the company. In 2014, Nevzlin founded the monthly Hebrew-language magazine Liberal, which publishes analyses of Israeli political life, communications and culture. The inaugural issue appeared in May 2014.

=== Legal disputes ===
In 2003, following prolonged clashes with the Kremlin, Yukos' controlling shareholder, Mikhail Khodorkovsky, and another senior executive, Platon Lebedev, were arrested on charges of fraud and tax evasion. Both were convicted in 2005 following trials that were widely condemned internationally as procedurally flawed and politically motivated. Khodorkovsky was found guilty and the sentence for tax evasion and fraud was upheld by the European Court of Human Rights for the same affair. Yukos' assets were subsequently awarded to state-owned companies in a series of forced auctions. Yukos was declared bankrupt in August 2006.

Nevzlin left Russia for Israel in 2003. In 2004 the Russian Prosecutor General's Office sought Nevzlin's extradition over hotly disputed criminal allegations against him related to his tenure at Yukos. The Israeli government rejected the extradition request due to insufficient evidence. Two members of the Israeli public who felt aggrieved by their government's decision sued to have it reversed. They also petitioned the interior minister to revoke Nevzlin's Israeli citizenship on the grounds that it was obtained under false pretenses. Nevzlin's attorney, David Libai, argued that the charges against him were the result of political persecution. A spokesman for Nevzlin stated in reaction to the extradition request, "Amnesty International, the European Parliament, and the court in the UK, are only some of the bodies that have found that Russian president Vladimir Putin is persecuting Mikhail Khodorovsky, Leonid Nevzlin, and the other shareholders in Yukos, who dared to support democratic opposition parties and openly come out against him. Putin does not hesitate to make use of the Russian authorities that are subordinate to him to create false charges – in the best tradition of the KGB, in which Putin grew up."

In May 2008, Israel's Supreme Court found there was no evidence directly connecting Nevzlin to the criminal allegations made against him. The court rejected extradition and denied the motion to strip Nevzlin of his citizenship. Israel's interior minister and attorney general were ordered to pay Nevzlin's court costs for this case. Nevzlin was tried in absentia in Russia in March 2008, found guilty of several counts of conspiracy to murder and sentenced to life imprisonment. Nevzlin called the court case a show trial orchestrated by Vladimir Putin.

In 2014, the Permanent Court of Arbitration in The Hague, despite the Russian Duma having never ratified the treaty under which this judgment was made, therefore making a non-legally-binding judgment, ruled unanimously that the Russian authorities had conducted a "ruthless campaign to destroy Yukos, appropriate its assets and eliminate Mr. [Mikhail] Khodorkovsky as a political opponent". According to the panel, the forced auction of core parts of the company through contested bankruptcy proceedings "was not driven by motives of tax collection but by the desire of the State to acquire Yukos' most valuable asset and bankrupt Yukos.... In short, it was in effect a devious and calculated expropriation".

The former Yukos shareholders were awarded damages totaling $50 billion – the largest arbitration award in history. As the biggest shareholder of GML, the former Yukos holding company that brought the legal case, with a 70 per cent stake, Nevzlin stands to be the biggest single beneficiary from The Hague's ruling. The Russian government failed to meet the deadline of 15 January 2015 for paying the award. Early news reports indicated that the former Yukos investors would seek redress by asking U.S. and EU courts to seize Russian-owned assets on their own territories.

Nevzlin was accused by associates of Russian dissident Alexei Navalny of ordering a hammer attack on exiled Russian dissident Leonid Volkov in Lithuania in March 2024. According to an investigation by The Insider Nevzlin also tried to kidnap and transfer him to Russia, and ordered two more attacks against associates of Navalny. Nevzlin denied the accusations, suggesting that it was "concocted in Moscow".

== Public affairs and philanthropy ==
Nevzlin was awarded the Order of Friendship, one of the Russian Federation's highest honors, for his efforts in supporting Boris Yeltsin's reelection campaign in 1996.

From March to December 2001 Nevzlin served as president of the Russian Jewish Congress. He was a key player in Jewish historical and heritage research projects, including the establishment of the Moscow Jewish Cultural Center and the International Center for Russian and Eastern European Jewish Studies in Moscow. Moreover, Nevzlin contributed to numerous other Jewish educational programs developed in collaboration with World ORT, the Jewish Agency for Israel and the American Jewish Joint Distribution Committee.

Since moving to Israel, Nevzlin has established the NADAV Foundation, which supports projects in Jewish studies and education, Israel-Diaspora relations and Jewish peoplehood. Its annual "NADAV Peoplehood Prize" has been awarded to such figures as author Elie Wiesel, retired Israeli Supreme Court Chief Justice Aharon Barak, and, most recently, Rabbi David Stav, an Israeli Orthodox rabbi.

Nevzlin created the Leonid Nevzlin Research Center for Russian and Eastern European Jewry at Jerusalem's Hebrew University. He has also served on the boards of both the Hebrew University of Jerusalem and Tel Aviv University.

In collaboration with the Israeli government, Nevzlin created a relief fund in 2004 to revive Beit Hatfutsot – the Museum of the Jewish People, located on the campus of Tel Aviv University, and was elected chairman of its International Board of governors. The NADAV Foundation launched the International School for Jewish Peoplehood Studies at Beit Hatfutsot in 2006, and the Nevzlin Center for Jewish Peoplehood at the Interdisciplinary Center (IDC) Herzliya in 2010.

Nevzlin has served on the board of governors of the Jewish Agency for Israel and the board of trustees of Keren Hayesod, the United Israel Appeal, and as associate chairman of the board of directors of the Jewish People Policy Planning Institute.

Nevzlin is also a long-term supporter of Israeli healthcare charity Ezra LeMarpeh, founded by Avraham Elimelech Firer.

== Personal life ==
In 2014, Nevzlin acquired an apartment in the new, upscale Waldorf-Astoria hotel/apartment complex in the center of Jerusalem at a cost of 40 million shekels (approximately US$11.5 million).

Nevzlin is the author of the two books "Человек с рублём" ("Man with a Ruble", coauthored with Mikhail Khodorkovsky), in praise of free-market economics, and "Public Relations – кому это надо?” ("Public Relations – Who Needs Them?”).

Nevzlin has married three times and has five children including Irina Nevzlin, chair of the board of directors at Beit Hatfutsot. Through Irina, he is the father in law of Israeli politician Yuli Edelstein.

== See also ==
- Vladimir Petukhov
- Klebnikov, Paul (2000). Godfather of the Kremlin: Boris Berezovsky and the looting of Russia. Harcourt. ISBN 0-15-100621-0.
- David E. Hoffman The Oligarchs: Wealth and Power in the New Russia (PublicAffairs, 2002), ISBN 978-1-58648-001-1
- Alex Gibney's 2019 film Citizen K and where Nevzlin plays himself.

== Publications ==
- Chelovek s rublyom. (en: The man with the Rubel.), with Mikhail Khodorkovsky, Moscow: Menatep-Inform 1992, ISBN 978-5-7043-0575-0
