= Petersburg Fuel Company =

Russian company

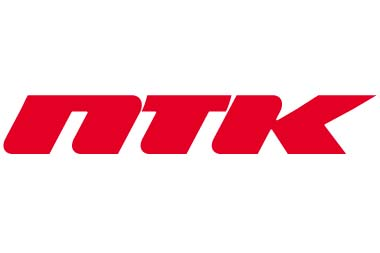
- Industry: Oil
- Founded: 1994
- Defunct: 2021
- Headquarters: Saint Petersburg, Russia
- Revenue: 29,443,000,000 Russian ruble (2017)
- Parent: St. Petersburg City Bank (since 2001); Rosneft (2019-2021)
- Website: www.ptk.ru

The Petersburg Fuel Company (PTK, in Russian: Петербургская топливная компания, ПТК) was an open joint-stock company of Saint Petersburg, Russia, founded in September 1994, after a fuel supply crisis had hit the city hard. The company specializing mostly in gasoline refining, storage, transportation and retailing. Since 2001, PTK had been an open joint stock company. In 2001 the company was restructured as an open joint-stock company, and became a subsidiary of St. Petersburg City Bank. In 2019, PTK was acquired by Rosneft, and in 2021, the PTK was liquidated and its assets merged into Rosneft's regional subsidiary RN-North-West LLC (ООО "РН-Северо-Запад"), founded in 2017.

As of July 2002, it was the leading gasoline retail operator in Saint Petersburg and runs 94 of the city’s 270 gasoline filling stations and several stations in the neighboring regions. As of mid-2003, it had 69 stations and 28% of sales followed by Phaeton Gasoline Company with 36 stations and a 14% market share. According to its website, it currently (February 2008) has 84 stations in St Petersburg and 111 elsewhere in Russia, including 10 in Moscow (of which at least 4 were formerly supplied by Yukos). The company also has acquired the Rzhevka Airport after its bankruptcy.

== History ==
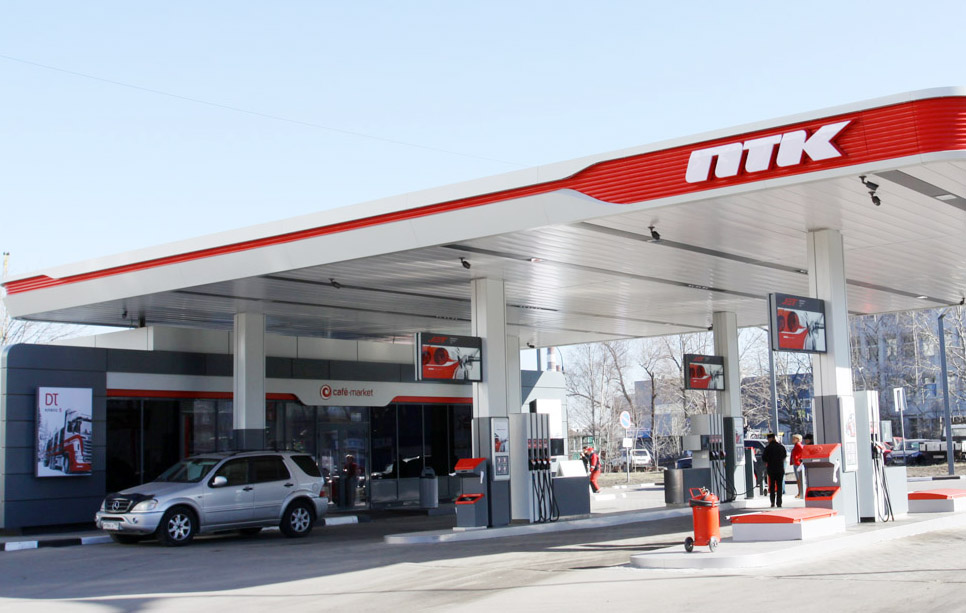
PFC filling station

Petersburg Fuel Company (PTK) was founded in September 1994 as a closed joint stock company by the City Property Management Committee of Saint Petersburg City Administration, Property Management Committee of Leningrad Oblast Administration, Baltic Sea Steamship Company, Northwestern Steamship Company, Oktyabrskaya Railway Directorate, Saint Petersburg Seaport. In 1994, as deputy mayor of Saint Petersburg, Vladimir Putin awarded PTK the right to be the sole supplier of gasoline to the city, including supply to the huge fleet of city ambulances, police cars, buses and taxis.

The deal allegedly triggered a violent gang war during which, on 1 June 1994, an attempt was made on the life of Vladimir Kumarin, the vice-president of PTK and alleged leader of Tambovskaya Bratva.

The first board of directors and managing committee of the company were elected on 13 September 1994. PTK began to develop its filling stations network.

On 22 March 1996, Ziya Bazhayev became Vice-President of the company. On 4 June 1996 the company agreed to cooperate with Yukos until 2000. In September 1996 the company, for the first time, bought 20 thousand tons of crude oil to process in the Kirishinefteorgsintez refinery.

On 13 October 1998, company president Dmitry Filippov died from wounds three days after the explosion of a radio-controlled mine. In 1996 he took part in the elections for the position of St. Petersburg governor, and as of 1998 was an authorized delegate of Gennady Seleznyov, Speaker of the State Duma. On February 16, 1999 Yury Shutov, a deputy in St. Petersburg Legislative Assembly and a prominent businessman, was arrested on charges of having organized this and other contract murders.

Andrei Stepanov, in turn, unsuccessfully took part as a contender in the 1999 St. Petersburg Legislative Assembly election. The company's president Yuri Antonov served as vice-governor of Saint Petersburg from 1997 till 2002.

In 2001, the company was restructured as an open joint-stock company, and became a subsidiary of St. Petersburg City Bank. The shareholding of the City Property Committee of the Saint Petersburg City Administration, under Valery Nazarov, reduced from 14.5% to 1.3%.

In August 2001, Interior Minister, Boris Gryzlov claimed that up to 100 industrial enterprises in Saint Petersburg (including PTK), as well as the four main sea ports of Northwestern Russia, Saint Petersburg, Kaliningrad, Arkhangelsk and Murmansk, were controlled by the Tambov Gang. In May 2002, Gryzlov, sent a commission of inquiry to Saint Petersburg to investigate allegations of corruption in the city's gasoline market. The investigation was started after the Faeton Gasoline Company, second largest gasoline retailer in the city, complained to both Gryzlov and the Prosecutor General's Office in April that the Saint Petersburg City Administration gave preferences to PTK. However, this had no evident consequences.

In August 2006, PTK president Yuri Antonov announced that the company would like to sell its stations to the oil company Surgutneftegaz, its supplier of gasoline, and that Gazprom and Surgutneftegaz might build a storage and distribution terminal near St. Petersburg on a 7 km^{2} site owned by Petersburg Fuel Company.

== Directors General ==
- 13 September 1994 – German Makarov
- 21 November 1995 – Alexander Kozlov
- 29 January 1997 – Vladimir Smirnov
- 1 July 1998 – Vyacheslav Shalin
- 1 June 1999 – Vadim Glazkov
- July 1999 – Vyacheslav Shalin

== Chairpersons of the Board of Directors ==
- September 13, 1994 – Dmitry Filippov
- September 30, 1996 – Vladimir Kalashov
- June 30, 1997 – Andrei Stepanov
- December 28, 1999 – Vladimir Smirnov
- June 30, 2001 – Vadim Glazkov
- November 30, 2004 – Yury Antonov

== Shareholder structure ==
(as of January 2007)

- Petersburg City Bank - 75.9%
- Promtrade Ltd. - 21.9%
- City Property Committee of the Saint Petersburg City Administration - 1.6%
- VITA-X JSC - 0.6%

== See also ==
- Petroleum industry in Russia
