= Dmitry Filippov (politician) =

Soviet-Russian politician and businessman (1944–1998)

- Дмитрий Филиппов
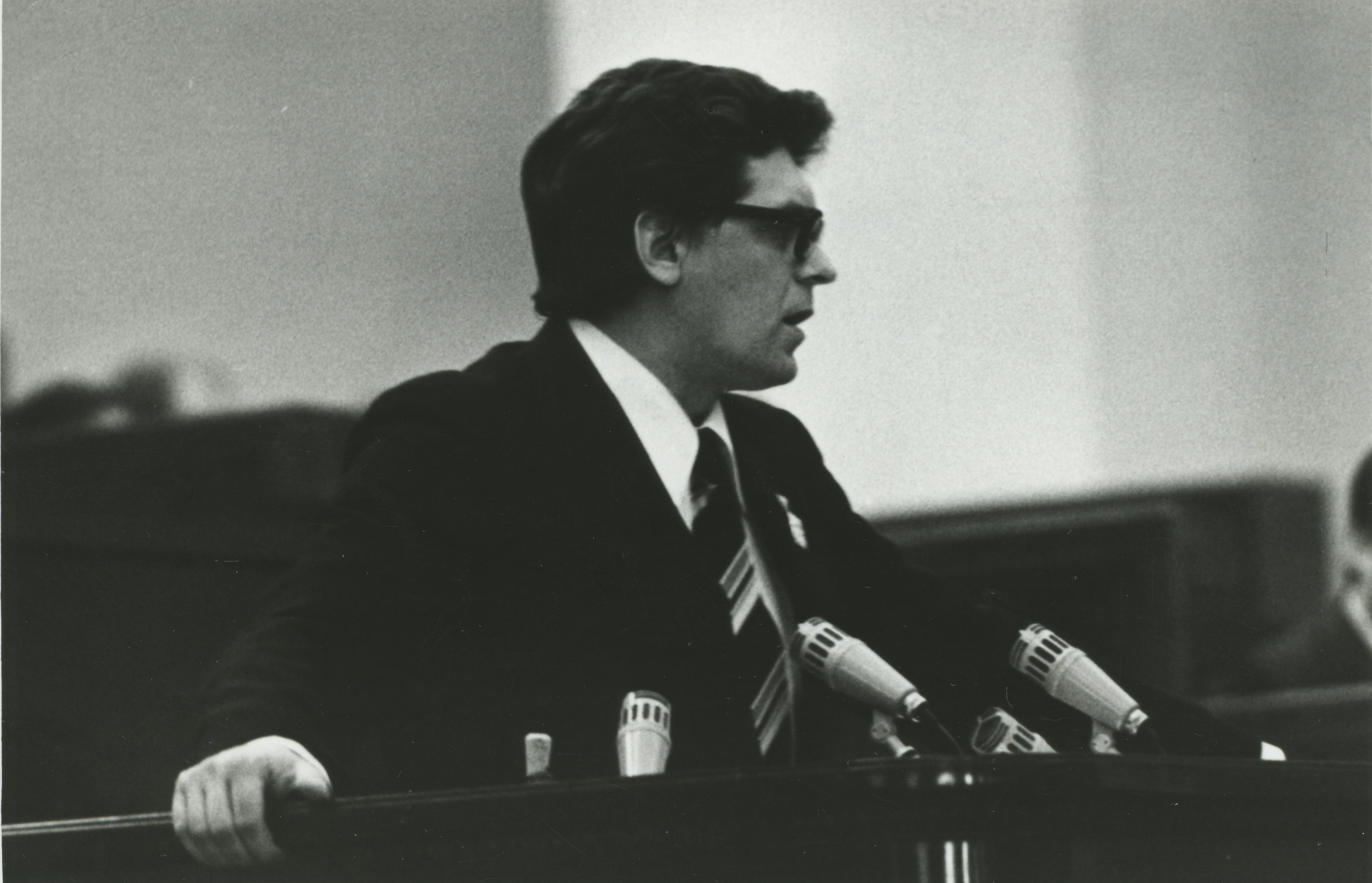

Member of the Legislative Assembly of Saint Petersburg
- In office 1984–1993

Personal details
- Born: 1 August 1944 Yurga, Kemerovo Oblast, Russian SFSR, Soviet Union
- Died: 13 October 1998 (aged 54) Saint Petersburg, Russia
- Cause of death: Assassination
- Resting place: Nikolskoe Cemetery, Saint Petersburg
- Party: Communist Party of the Soviet Union (until 1991); Communist Party of the Russian Federation (from 1991)
- Education: Leningrad Electrotechnical Institute

Dmitry Filippov (Russian: Дмитрий Николаевич Филиппов; 1 August 1944 – 13 October 1998) was a Soviet and Russian politician and businessman. An influential member of the Communist Party of the Soviet Union and the Lensovet before 1991, Filippov established Saint Petersburg's tax service in the early 1990s and was one of the city's most prominent businessmen during the 1990s, with significant investments in the Russian petrochemical industry. He was killed in a 1998 bombing; Saint Petersburg Legislative Assembly member Yury Shutov was found guilty of his assassination by the Saint Petersburg city court in 2006 after a seven-year trial.

== Early life ==
Filippov was born in Yurga, in the Siberian Kemerovo Oblast. He graduated from Leningrad Electrotechnical Institute in 1967. After graduation he worked as a foreman, a technologist, and a head of section at the Leningrad Scientific and Production Association known as "Pozitron".

== Soviet political career ==
=== Komsomol leader ===
1973–1974 - a secretary of the Leningrad Regional Committee of Komsomol, then - the first secretary of the Leningrad Regional Committee of Komsomol.

1974–1983 - a secretary of the Komsomol Central Committee, a member of the Council of Ministers USSR, chief of staff of construction of Baikal-Amur Railway, chief of staff to develop the West Siberian oil and gas industry.

1975–1983 - the Vice-President of the Soviet-Hungarian friendship society.

from 1978 - also a member of the Presidium of the AUCCTU.

=== Leningrad Communist Party leader ===
1983–1985 - the first secretary of the District Committee Smolninsky of the Communist Party in Leningrad. He was appointed to this position by the direct order of Andropov, Yuri Vladimirovich.

1985–1986 - the head of the light and food industry's department of the Leningrad Regional Committee of the Communist Party.

1986–1990 - the secretary - supervisor of the industry of Leningrad and Leningrad region) of the Leningrad Regional Committee of the Communist Party.

Filippov became a member of the Lensovet in 1984. Writing for the George Washington University, researcher Egor Sennikov describes him as having been a "major Soviet nomenklatura" during the late Soviet period.

== In post-Soviet Russia ==
Following the dissolution of the Soviet Union, Filippov became one of Leningrad (renamed to Saint Petersburg)'s most influential figures. He created the Saint Petersburg Tax Inspectorate and served as its de facto chair from 1990 to 1993, placing him in control of the city's money flows. He resigned in 1993 for unclear reasons, which newspaper Kommersant alleged involved a conflict with city governor Anatoly Sobchak. He left the Legislative Assembly of Saint Petersburg the same year. Filippov was a member of the Communist Party of the Russian Federation during the 1990s, affiliated with the party's moderate faction. CPRF politician Yuri Belov posthumously described him as a supporter of socialism with Chinese characteristics in 2013, additionally noting that he viewed Keynesian policies of state capitalism as a "lesser evil" compared to the liberal policies of Boris Yeltsin's government.

Filippov maintained vast financial interests across Saint Petersburg and Russia, making him one of the country's most prominent businessmen. He was chairman of the board of directors at Mikhail Khodorkovsky's Bank Menatep in Saint Petersburg, president of Petersburg Fuel Company and chairman of other petroleum and petrochemical corporations. He owned 60% of shares in Tobolsk Petrochemical Plant, a facility in western Siberia. Several politicians were patrons of Filippov during this time, including Shamil Tarpishchev and Oleg Soskovets. Filippov regarded his primary roles as being at Menatep, followed by petroleum company RosCo (previously owned by businessman Sergey Rogov until his 1996 assassination), and Delovoy Peterburg reported in 1999 that prior to his death he was known to introduce himself first using a Menatep business card, followed by a RosCo card.

Filippov had financial and political influence at a national level at the time of his death; he was particularly close with Khodorkovsky, a fellow former member of the Komsomol, and State Duma Speaker Gennadiy Seleznyov, whom he had been a friend of since both were members of the CPSU. He had some connections with Governor Vladimir Yakovlev (though Delovoy Peterburg stated in 1999 that these had been exaggerated), and he was a supporter of Yevgeny Primakov. James Meek, writing for The Guardian, described Filippov as part of a big tent anti-corruption and anti-crime coalition in Saint Petersburg's local politics, along with fellow communist Mikhail Osherov (an aide to Seleznyov) and liberals Mikhail Manevich and Galina Starovoytova. All four were assassinated in 1998.

=== Assassination ===
At around 21:00 on 10 October 1998, Filippov returned to his home on 15 Tverskaya Street from a business meeting. As Filippov and his two bodyguards entered the building, a bomb was detonated, completely destroying the building and seriously injuring all three. The Saint Petersburg department of the Ministry of Internal Affairs, located across the street, was immediately alerted to the bombing and quickly arrived, cordoning the area off. They were later joined by the Federal Security Service, whose bomb experts determined that the building had been destroyed with a radio explosive equivalent to 500 grams of TNT wired to the ceiling.

Filippov and his guards were hospitalised at the S. M. Kirov Military Medical Academy. Filippov's bodyguards suffered burns injuries, while Filippov himself sustained a head injury and underwent several surgeries. He briefly regained consciousness on 13 October before dying later that day.

Investigations by the FSB focused primarily on his business interests. Two people were accused of orchestrating Filippov's murder; Yury Shutov, a Member of the Legislative Assembly, was accused of organising a gang and overseeing the murders of Filippov and multiple other Saint Petersburg businessmen and preparing to murder Vyacheslav Shevchenko, while Vladimir Yudin, a former director of the Tobolsk Petrochemical Plant (owned by Filippov) was accused of seeking out Muscovite gangsters (who had, in turn, contacted Shutov) in order to kill Filippov as part of a dispute over the management of the plant. Belov later claimed that Filippov had been assassinated by the Russian government for his political views.

Shutov was found guilty of Filippov's assassination on 15 February 2006. He was sentenced to life imprisonment and died in prison in 2014.
