= Tambovskaya Bratva =

Gang in Saint Petersburg, Russia

- Founded: 1987
- Founding location: Leningrad, Soviet Union
- Years active: 1988–present
- Territory: St Petersburg, Lenoblast, part of Novgorod oblast, part of Pskov oblast and part of Karelia
- Ethnicity: Russian
- Membership (est.): Around 600
- Activities: contract killing, extortion, loan sharking, prostitution, bootlegging, drug trafficking, construction management, money laundering, robbery and theft, now legal businesses
- Allies: Obshchak
- Rivals: Solntsevskaya Bratva

The Tambovskaya Bratva is a large gang in Saint Petersburg, Russia. According to common allegations, it was organised in Leningrad in 1988 by two men from Tambov Oblast, Vladimir Kumarin and one from St. Petersburg. The gang is named after their region of origin. Despite allegations, Kumarin continues to deny his involvement. Originally the gangsters were recruited from people of Tambov origin and sportsmen, and were engaged in a protection racket.

It became famous in the city after coverage from Alexander Nevzorov in his 600 seconds TV show in the city.

== Saint Petersburg ==
After establishing in 1988, the Tambov Gang used a Baroque church on Vasilyevsky Island as the site for interrogating people. Kumarin and Gennady Petrov have been close to the KGB since the late 1980s.

Viktor Ivanov has strong links to the Tambov Gang. He supported Vladimir Kumarin's Tambovskaya OGG in their war against the Malyshevskaya OGG for control of the Leningrad sea port and the trafficking of Colombian narcotics through the Leningrad sea port to Europe.

In 1989, the gang clashed with Malyshev's Gang, another leading criminal group of Leningrad, in a bloody armed conflict. In 1990, some of the gang members including Kumarin were imprisoned for racketeering, but Kumarin was released from prison in 1993. He later briefly allied with Alexander Malyshev (Russian: Александр Малышев), who had controlled the narcotics trade since 1993 after ousting the Azerbaijani mafia from the trade, to fight the Kazan gang from Tatarstan. (Note: The Alexander Malyshev gang's headquarters was at Berezovaya Alleya, d. 7., and hosted Japanese yakuza from Kobe and Osaka, and other close mafia friends from Ukraine, Georgia, and the Baltics. This address was also the 1991 established Joint Venture (JV) Petrodin address which provided capital, chorny mal or black cash from the gang's casinos, drug trades, and rackets, for Bank Rossiya. Viktor Zolotov, a bodyguard, picked up chorny mal for Vladimir Putin. Malyshev was very close to Gennady Petrov and Sergei Kuzmin who were 65% owners of JV Pertodin through their BHM company and Kinichi Kamiyasu's Stockholm-based Dyna AB which owned 35% of JV Petrodin. Kinichi Kamiyasu was the son of a Japanese yakuza from Kobe-Osaka and his Dyna AB's address was HäLSINGEGATAN 14-16, S-113 23 Stockholm, Sweden. JV Petrodin was an owner of Bank Rossiya, too. Their casino JV Casino Neva, which Gennady Petrov controlled and was registered at Antonenko Street, 6, which was the same address as Vladimir Putin's Committee for External Relations, was co-owned by the Austrian firm Novomatic and the Russian "Neva-Chance" (AOZT "Casino") which according to law was supposed to own a share in every St Petersburg casino. The telephone number for "Neva-Chance", JV Casino Neva, and Putin's Committee for External Relations was exactly the same, too. JV Petrodin is a portmanteau of Petrov and din or Dyna.)

Kinichi Kamiyasu met Gennady Petrov (Russian: Геннадий Васильевич Петров) and Kuzmin in December 1990 when Manvel Davidov through his father Temo Davidov, a member of the Chechen mafia which had caused Manvel to flee the Soviet Union for Stockholm where Kinichi Kamiyasu gave him a job and a Polish passport, introduced the Russian mafia, Petrov, Kuzmin, and Malyshev, to the son of a Japanese yakuza from Kobe-Osaka, Kinichi Kamiyasu. Temo Davidov had been acquainted with Petrov, Kuzmin, and Malyshev.

In 1993 – 1995, an internal war developed between groups within the Tambov Gang. On June 1, 1994, Kumarin survived a murder attempt in his car but was severely wounded and lost his arm. He believed that the Velikie Luki were responsible and, later, Viktor Gavrilenkov (Russian: Виктор Гавриленков) and Nikolai Gavrilenkov (Russian: Николай Гавриленков) were shot with Viktor Gavrilenkov being killed in the bedlam. He continued his recovery in Düsseldorf (Germany) and Switzerland. By 1995, he allegedly had retaken full control over the gang.

By then, the gang had incorporated some of the racketeer businessmen and became interested in investment and fuel trading effectively evolving into a mafia. It also helped organizing several private security enterprises. Some of its members allegedly became members of the State Duma and the Legislative Assembly of Saint Petersburg, as well as a sector opening in Sydney, Australia allegedly being run by Mikhail Klapanov. Even the speaker of the Assembly Viktor Novosyolov gave his support and maintained close relationships with Kumarin.

Formed in September 1994, the Petersburg Fuel Company (PTK) was administrated by the Saint Petersburg City Administration. (Note: Ilya Traber is very close to Dmitry Fillipov who was on the board of PTK.)

During the later half of 1993 and into 1994 and with bank accounts in New York, Vladimir I. Dyakov (Russian: Дьяков Владимир Иванович, b.1959) of the Kazan Gang, which had many very devout Muslim Tatars, fought the Tambov Gang for control of St. Petersburg's energy trade. (Note: During this time and out of fear for his own daughters' safety, Vladimir Putin sent his daughters Maria and Ekaterina to Germany for schooling and had his close friend the German banker Matthias Warnig be their legal guardian.) The St Petersburg mafia gangs also fought for control of the St Petersburg seaport, however, Viktor Ivanov strongly supported the Tambov Gang to control both the oil and the seaport.

From 1998 to 1999, Kumarin became Deputy President of PTK, the top fuel trading company in the city.

In the autumn of 1999, the status of the gang started deteriorating again. Viktor Novosyolov was killed by an explosion in his car on October 20. Some of its most important members were imprisoned or killed. Kumarin left his position of PTK Deputy President.

The Tambov Gang now includes several hundred active members.

In August 2001, Interior Minister of Russia Boris Gryzlov said that the Tambov Gang controlled up to 100 industrial enterprises in Saint Petersburg, including PTK, the leading fuel retailing operator in the city, as well as four main sea ports of Northwestern Russia, Saint Petersburg, Kaliningrad, Arkhangelsk and Murmansk.

On 16 January 2007, the Prosecutor General of Russia Yury Chaika announced that the Tambov Gang had recently forcefully taken over 13 large enterprises in Saint Petersburg and was being investigated.

In May 2015, Spanish prosecutors alleged that Parex Bank, which held mostly offshore deposits for persons from Russia, was the preferred Latvian bank for the money laundering of Vladimir Putin, Yuri Chaika, and Russian mafia especially the Tambovskaya Mafia from Saint Petersburg and that very large sums were laundered for them through Latvian and German firms associated with Parex Bank and Overseas Services, which is a sister firm of Parex Bank, by Mikhail Rebo, also spelled Rabo, and his wife Tatiana Rebo who was the manager of the Parex Bank Berlin.

== 2007 and 2008 arrests ==
Alexander Litvinenko was a key witness for the Spanish prosecutors.

On 13 June 2008 Spanish police arrested 20 members of the organisation's Spanish branch. In connection with the raid Russian politician Vladislav Reznik was investigated A money laundering scheme involved Vera Metallurgica, a subsidiary of Ural Mining and Metallurgical Company (UMMC) which Oleg Deripaska and Iskander Makhmudov were the main owners in the early 2000s.

Alexander Malyshev, apparently having resolved his feud with the gang, joined with them instead and moved to Spain to continue operations after several attempts on his life in Saint Petersburg. Gennady Petrov, a high-ranking associate and neighbour of the sister of King Juan Carlos was also arrested. During the police operation, code-named Operation Troika, US$307,000 in cash and twenty-three luxury cars were seized. Bank accounts totalling €12 million were frozen. Arrests were made in Berlin as well, where a member of the organisation, Michael Rebo, was involved in laundering the proceeds of drug trafficking and other illegal activity.

The criminal investigation of 2008 led to further arrests and a major Russian mafia (the Tambov Gang) money laundering scheme be revealed. According to the Bulgarian prosecutor more than one billion euros of Russian money had been laundered through a series of financial transactions in Bulgaria and Estonia. The laundered money was, according to allegations, part of the Saint Petersburg Tambov gang's proceeds from drug trafficking, prostitution and protection rackets. The alleged Tambov Gang money laundering operation was coordinated by Elizabet Elena Von Messing and Svetozar Milter.

According to the sources, about a billion euros of Russian money were first transferred to a real estate and financial services company in Bulgaria, called Optima Ca. That firm then wired half of the money to the Estonian financial house AS Tavid, which sent the money back to Russia. The rest of the money was transferred to accounts in Cyprus, Dubai, Hong Kong and other countries, according to the newspaper.

The investigation, which is going on in Bulgaria, is secret. Two persons were investigated in Bulgaria on May 23, 2008, for this case, Elizabet Elena Von Messing and Sverozar Milter. Von Messing, a Russian with Finnish citizenship and whose second husband Andrei Khloev (Russian: Андрей Хлоев) is very close to Kumarin, had acted as a proxy. The court hearings on the investigation of the two Russians were not open to the public.

A similar trial in Spain involves the Solntsevo Gang.

== Conclusion ==
After a ten-year trial the Third Section of the Criminal Chamber of the Spanish National Court has acquitted all 17 defendants on October 18, 2018, on all accounts. The prosecution provided insufficient evidence to link the defendants to the criminal conspiracy or any associated wrongdoing.

Vladislav Reznik, Michail Rebo, Juri Salikov, Diana Gindin, Andrey Malenkovich, Leonid Khazhin, Svetozar Milter, Leocadia Martin Garcia and Ignacio Pedro Urquiujo Sierra and others are among the acquitted.

== Criminal sphere ==
According to Mark Galeotti in 2017, the Tamboskaya OGG controls both the Saint Petersburg sea port and the Stockholm sea port.

== See also ==
- Roman Tsepov
- Russian mafia
