= Vladimir Kumarin =

Russian criminal (born 1956)

- Born: Vladimir Vladimirovich Kumarin; 15 February 1956 (age 70); Leningrad, USSR
- Occupations: Businessman, Gangster, boss of Tambov Gang
- Criminal charges: Fraud, Money laundering
- Penalty: 24 years

Vladimir Kumarin, aka Vladimir Barsukov, aka "Kum" is a Russian businessman, former deputy president of the Petersburg Fuel Company (PTK) between 1998 and 1999, and the boss of the criminal Tambovskaya Bratva (Tambov gang) of Saint Petersburg.

== Biography ==
Kumarin was born in Tambov, after compulsory military service he came to Leningrad to study. In the 1980s he served his first sentence for possession of arms and forged documents. Thereafter he met a compatriot from Tambov, Valery Ledovskikh with whom he founded a gang. The gang initially invited only persons from Tambov region (thus its name, Tambovskaya). Being not yet strong enough to operate independently, the gang merged into the large criminal group Velikolukskaya (from Velikie Luki, Pskov region) and was engaged mostly in commercial racketeering.

In 1989 multiple members of Kumarin's gang were convicted for the bloody firefight with another criminal gang, Malyshevskaya. The verdict was rather mild, supposedly because the state prosecutor was severely injured by unknown persons during the investigation. After having completed a short sentence, Kumarin's gang swiftly took over all across the northwestern region of Russia – Leningrad, Pskov, Novgorod, and Karelia – challenging the business affairs of his former 'host gang'. A bloody skirmish with the Velikolukskaya gang caused Kumarin to fall into a month-long coma. His right arm had to be amputated at the shoulder and bullets pierced his stomach, chest and lungs. To this day he still has bullet fragments in his heart.

During the mid-1990s Kumarin attempted to legalize the criminal earnings of his gang using extensive contacts with the government of the City of St. Petersburg headed by mayor Anatoly Sobchak (1991–1996), to whom the current Russian president Vladimir Putin served as assistant. Kumarin was an investor to the Kirishinefteorgsintez (Киришинефтеоргсинтез) oil refinery and member of the Board of Petersburg Fuel Company (PTK) controlled by Kumarin. PTK became the sole supplier of gasoline to the municipal transport of St. Petersburg.

Since the late 1990s a few senior members of Kumarin's structures as well as of its adversaries were killed and a list of investigations of his past criminal affairs was published. In June 2003, the magazine Der Spiegel mentioned that, according to the German ministry of criminal affairs, the German firm St. Petersburg Real Estate Holding Company (German: St. Peterburg Immobilien und Beteiligungs AG) (SPAG) had fallen under suspicion of being involved in a money-laundering scheme through the Cali cocaine cartel with connections to Kumarin. The Russian co-owner of the SPAG's joint venture was the government of St. Petersburg, and Vladimir Putin, then the municipal official, was a member of the board from 1992 to 2000. In April 2004 German police interrogated Kumarin but no indictments were made. It has been suggested that Kumarin maintained good relations with Russian politicians Mikhail Glushenko and Alexander Filatov. Allegedly after refusing to back down from a business deal in favour of a politician close to Vladimir Putin, Kumarin was raided and arrested by 300 special forces officers on 24 August 2007. Prosecutor General Yury Chaika accused him of banditry and organizing a gang. He was also accused of the murder attempt on businessman Sergei Vasiliev, a rival in the oil business. In 2006, two men with automatic rifles sprayed Vasiliev's car with gunfire, wounding him and killing one of his bodyguards.

Kumarin sought to clean up his image via donations to charities and the Russian Orthodox Church of which he was a devout follower as well as securing the release of two kidnapped children of Sergey Borodulin, Russian businessman. During this period his fame grew as well; dozens of celebrities and politicians attended his 50th birthday party in 2006. Kumarin was interviewed by Andrey Konstantinov, author of book Bandit Petersburg. Since 2004 Kumarin-Barsukov served as assistant to the St. Petersburg municipal MP, Alexander Nevzorov, well-known Russian journalist, who endorsed Kumarin as a "perfectly clean person" and invited Kumarin to play the role of King Louis XIV in his film. During the 1990s, however, Nevzorov covered multiple raids on Kumarin's gang on prime-time TV shows, making the gang notorious among the public.

After the 2007–2009 investigation Kumarin was sentenced to 14 years in prison plus a fine for the episodes of racketeering, fraud, money laundering and a murder attempt. The verdict was challenged in the European Court of Human Rights and by 2011 his sentence was reduced by 2.5 years. In 2012 another long investigation into Kumarin's affairs started. Kumarin was accused of contracting the killing of Galina Starovoitova. The main witness against Kumarin was Mikhail Glushenko, a.k.a. Misha-Khokhol, who in turn was sentenced to 17 years in prison in 2015 for arranging of the murder of Starovoitova.

In March 2019, he was sentenced by the Court of St. Petersburg to 24 years in prison for founding The Tambov Gang.

== See also ==
- Russian mafia
- List of crime bosses convicted in the 21st century
