= Pevcheskaya Tower =

- Певческая башня
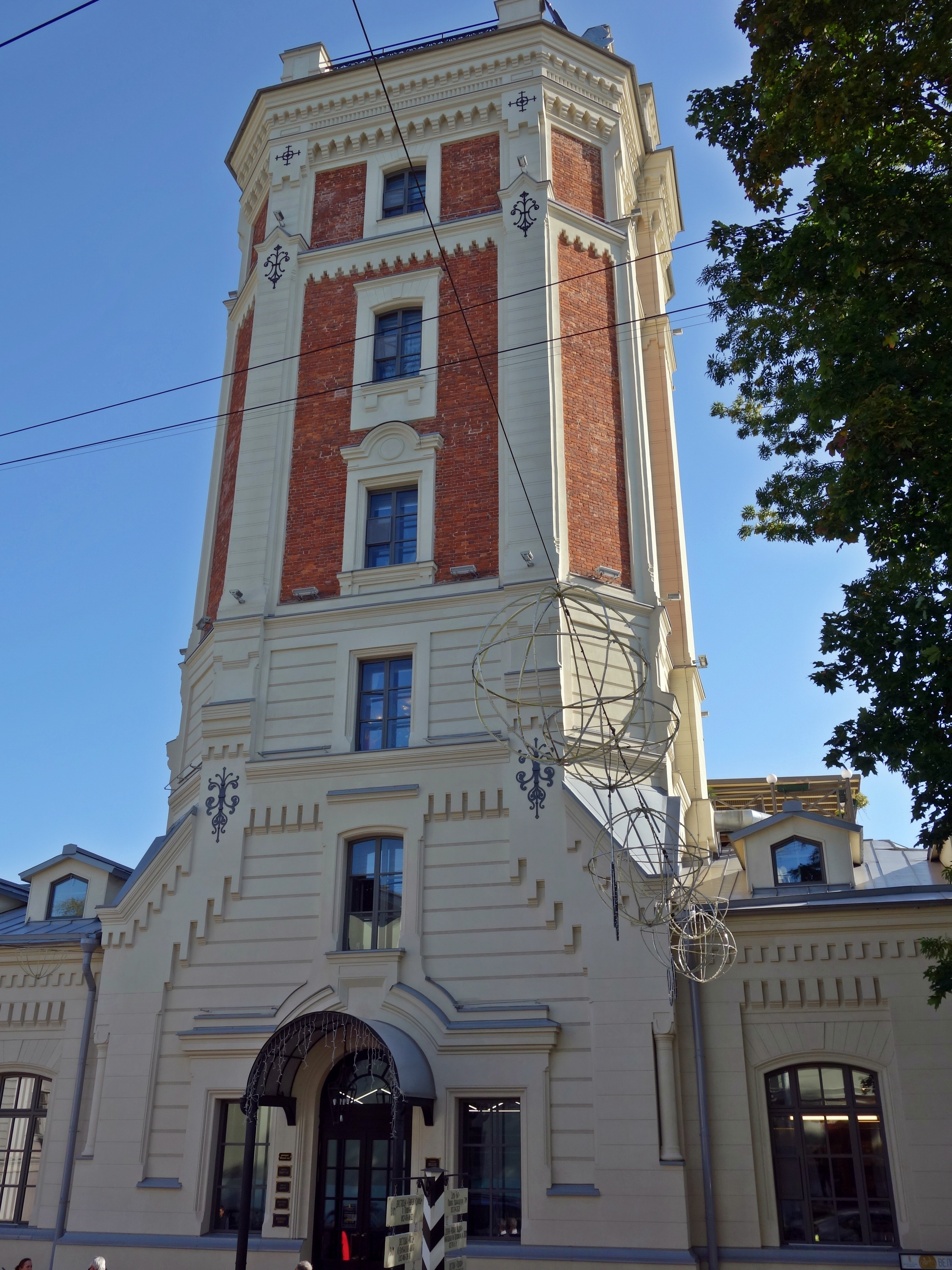

- Location in Saint Petersburg

General information
- Type: Water tower
- Location: Pushkin, Russia, 7, Litseisky Pereulok
- Coordinates: 59°43′04″N 30°23′56″E
- Current tenants: OOO "Madlen-2"
- Inaugurated: 1887
- Client: Saint Petersburg City Administration
- Owner: Committee for the Management of City Property of Saint Petersburg City Administration
- Landlord: Russian government

Dimensions
- Other dimensions: 6 floors

Technical details
- Structural system: Brickwork

Design and construction
- Architect: Aleksandr Vidov

Pevcheskaya Tower (Russian: Певческая башня) is a water tower in Pushkin, near St. Petersburg, Russia. The tower was constructed based on the design of architect Aleksandr Vidov as one of two towers of the Taitsky waterpipe. In addition to the basic function as a water tower, the first power station in Russia also operated there since the tower's construction. During the Second World War it suffered severe damage.

At the end of the 20th and the beginning of the 21st centuries restoration work took place. On March 15, 2005 there was a fire, after which the tower has not been restored. From 2009 is in renovation within project led by Gutsait Group (Saint Petersburg)
