= Viktor Sysoyev =

Russian footballer and politician

Personal information
- Full name: Viktor Igorevich Sysoyev
- Date of birth: 21 December 1994 (age 31)
- Height: 1.81 m (5 ft 11 1/2 in)
- Position: Midfielder

Senior career*
Years	Team	Apps	(Gls)
2013–2016	FC Dynamo Saint Petersburg	16	(0)
- * Club domestic league appearances and goals

Viktor Igorevich Sysoyev (Russian: Виктор Игоревич Сысоев; born 21 December 1994) is a Russian former football midfielder and politician.

== Biography ==
He made his debut in the Russian Football National League for FC Dynamo Saint Petersburg on 23 October 2013 in a game against FC Mordovia Saransk.

He is a son of Lyubov Yegorova. In 2016, he was elected a member of the Legislative Assembly of Saint Petersburg, representing the Liberal Democratic Party of Russia.
