= Vitaly Zholdasov =

Russian politician (born 1984)

- Виталий Жолдасов

Member of the Legislative Assembly of Saint Petersburg from the 22nd district
- Incumbent
- Assumed office 30 September 2026

Personal details
- Born: Vitaly Vladimirovich Zholdasov; 30 November 1984 (age 41) Leningrad, Russian SFSR, USSR
- Party: United Russia
- Education: SPSUACE
- Profession: Politician

Vitaly Vladimirovich Zholdasov (Russian: Виталий Владимирович Жолдасов; born 30 November 1984) is a Russian politician who currently serves as a member of the Legislative Assembly of Saint Petersburg since 30 September 2026.
