= KiNEx =

KiNEx (Kirishineftekhimexport, Russian acronym for 'Kirishi petroleum chemical export') (Russian: "Киришинефтеоргсинтез", Кинэкс (ЗАО)) is a Russian joint stock company, subsidiary of Surgutneftegaz, specializing in wholesale crude and refined oil trading, especially of the refined oil production of Kinef, mostly abroad in Northern Europe. Its refinery at Kirishi is the closest to Europe.

It was founded in 1987 as a subdivision of the Kirishinefteorgsintez refinery, based in Kirishi, Leningrad Oblast, to conduct external economic activity of the latter, but in 1991 became independent state-owned enterprise headed by Gennady Timchenko. Vadim Evseevich Somov (Russian: Вадим Евсеевич Сомов) was the general director of KiNex.

In 1990 Kirishineftekhimexport together with Volgotanker, the Dutch firm Sadko (Note: "Mikhas", as the godfather of the Sontsevo mafia, has shares in the companies "Maxim", JSC "SV-Holding", JV "Arbat-International", "Maqnex Kft" (Hungary), "Ariqon Co Ltd" (Great Britain), "Empirebond Ltd" (Israel), associations "Moscow, Spartak, Basketball" (Austria), "Rosides Establishment" (Liechtenstein). Mikhailov S.A., together with Rozhkov and Averin, took part in the creation of JV "SADKO" (has a network of restaurants and shops located mainly in the area of Krasnopresnenskaya embankment), the company "INTERCOM" (which is the founder of CB "Russian Investment Bank"), LLP "Vek Rossii", which is one of the founders of YALOSBANK.) and the state-owned Sovfintrade (Russian: государственные «СовФинТрейд») (Note: The Chairman of the Board of Directors of the state-owned SovFinTrade bank (Russian: государственные банк «СовФинТрейд») was Yuri Vyakhirev (Russian: Юрий Вяхирев) who is the son of the ex-head of Gazprom Rem Vyakhirev.) and several individuals founded joint venture Urals Ltd. Its Finnish subdivision Urals Finland Oy became the main foreign customer of Kirishineftekhimexport, as it required much less efforts and bureaucratic burden to export oil to a single company. Urals Finland Oy later separated from Urals JV Ltd. and in 1995 entered the KiNEx holding as IPP International Petroleum Products Oy. In 1990s Kirishineftekhimexport also became successful in exporting oil to Estonia, which in 1990 was still a part of the Soviet Union.

In 1994 Kirishineftekhimexport was privatized by its top-managers Adolf Smirnov (Russian: Адольф Павлович Смирнов), Andrei Katkov (Russian: Андрей Львович Катков), Yevgeni Malov (Russian: Евгений Иванович Малов) and Gennady Timchenko and became a joint stock company registered in Saint Petersburg. It had been headed by Director General Adolf Smirnov until his death in 2004. Since then has been its Director General. The company had its own oil fields in the Khanty–Mansi Autonomous Okrug, but later sold them out.

In 1996 the state sold its remaining 49% stake in the company. In the same year financial and investment projects of KiNEx were transferred to the KiNEx Invest JSC, owned by Smirnov, Katkov, Malov and Timchenko (by 25% each) and headed by Director General Yury Yerofeyev. In 1998 KiNEx Invest acquired control over a 20.7% share of the Russia Bank through the Finnish firm IPP with Andrei Katkov, who is a representative of KiNEx, as head of the bank's board of directors.

== See also ==
- Petroleum industry in Russia
