= Our Generation 2023 =

International children's song competition

- Music Without Borders

Date and venue
- Final: 18 November 2023
- Venue: Moscow Concert Hall; Moscow, Russia

Organisation
- Host broadcaster: NTV
- Presenters: Lera Kudryavtseva; Vyacheslav Makarov; Margo Shvedova

Participants
- Number of entries: 13
- Debuting countries: Armenia; Azerbaijan; Belarus; Brazil; China; Kazakhstan; Kyrgyzstan; Mauritius; Mongolia; Russia; South Africa; Tajikistan; Uzbekistan

Vote
- Voting system: Each country's jury awards 1 - 9, 11, 15, 20 points to the 12 other songs. Public vote for up to 5 countries, including their own.
- Winning song: China - "Liúdòng de xīwàng" Russia - “Vy so mnoy”

Our Generation 2023 was the inaugural edition of the Our Generation song contest (Russian: Наше поколение) hosted by NTV and funded by the Ministry of Foreign Affairs of the Russian Federation and the Presidential Fund for Cultural Initiatives. The contest was originally scheduled to occur in late 2022, however was later delayed until 2023, where it took place on 18 November at the Moscow Concert Hall on Andropov Avenue in Moscow, Russia.

The competition was devised as an alternative to the Junior Eurovision Song Contest 2022, in which Russia originally intended to compete. However, as a result of the Russian invasion of Ukraine, all EBU members from Russia announced their withdrawal from the union in February 2022 following Russia's exclusion from the Eurovision Song Contest 2022

The winners of the contest were China's Yichun Wang with the song "Liúdòng de xīwàng" (winning the public vote with 9.69%), and Russia's Idar Kotsev with the song “Vy so mnoy” (winning the jury vote with 196 points)

== Contest rules ==
The contest's rules share many similarities with the Junior Eurovision Song Contest and its adult counterpart. Key rules of the contest include:

- The artist must be between 9 and 15 years of age as of the date of the final
- A maximum of 6 performers may appear on stage
- The song must be "authored by the participant, or [they] must take an active part in its creation"
- An entry must be between 02:50 and 03:00 in length
- The lyrics of the song must be at least 60% in the delegation's national language, and the other 40% in one of 8 international languages - English, Spanish, French, Chinese, Arabic, Russian, Portuguese or German

== Participating countries ==
Originally, 17 countries were announced to be competing in the inaugural contest, however Egypt, India, Pakistan and Thailand ultimately would not end up sending a participant. On October 11, 2022, the submission deadline for entries was extended to May 1, 2023.

The songs competing at the contest would be revealed over the period of a week, from November 12, 2023, until November 17, 2023.

Participants of Our Generation 2023
Country	Artist	Song
Armenia	Satti	"Ser hayastanin" (Սեր Հայաստանին) "Love For Armenia"
Azerbaijan	Selin Iskenderova	"Ptitsa schast'ya" (Птица счастья) (Bird of Fortune)
Belarus	Alina Glyzno	"Golos lyubvi" (Голос любви) (Voice Of Love)
Brazil	Davi Cunha Vieira	“Vai, pode ir" (Go, You Can Go)
China	Yichun Wang	"Liúdòng de xīwàng" (流动的希望) (Hope In Motion)
Kazakhstan	Elgiza Karazhanova	“1000 dney” (1000 дней) (1000 Days)
Kyrgyzstan	Emir Abykeev	“Balalık” (Балалык) (Childhood)
Mauritius	Evanzhelika Batarshina	“I Wanna Dance”
Mongolia	Nomuundari Ganzorig	“Bujeerei” (Бүжиг) (Dance)
Russia	Idar Kotsev	“Vy so mnoy” (Вы со мной) (You Are With Me)
South Africa	Tsepan Mpo Monare	“Aforika” (Africa)
Tajikistan	Omina Jabborova	“Modar” (Модар) (Mother)
Uzbekistan	Sherbek Shavkatov	"O'zbekiston" (Uzbekistan)

== Contest overview ==
The opening ceremony for 'Our Generation' took place on 12 November at Pavilion 75 in Moscow, hosted by TV presenters Nastya Knyazeva and Artyom Shalimov. The live final was televised on 18 November 2023 at 16:30 MSK on NTV and NTV-mir. The running order was published on 11 November 2023, with a total of 13 countries participating in the competition. The contest had 2 winners, with Russia's Idar Kotsev winning the jury vote with 196 points and China's Yichun Wang winning the public vote with 9.69% of votes.

During the interval, Sofia Feskova, who represented Russia at the Junior Eurovision Song Contest 2020 performed her song "Supernatural", Dima Bilan & The Igor Krutoy Academy Choir then performed his song "Молния". Finally, Junior Eurovision 2021 artist Tatyana Mezhentseva performed her song "Mon Ami", which placed 7th at Junior Eurovision with 124 points. The contest concluded with a performance of the common song by all 13 competing artists.

R/O	Country	Artist	Song	Place	
R/O	Country	Artist	Song	Jury	Public
1	China	Yichun Wang	"流动的希望"	10th	1st
2	Armenia	Satti	"Սեր Հայաստանին"	2nd	5th
3	Kyrgyzstan	Emir Abykeev	“Балалык”	8th	12th
4	Belarus	Alina Glyzno	"Голос любви"	6th	7th
5	South Africa	Tsepan Mpo Monare	“Aforika”	3rd	6th
6	Kazakhstan	Elgiza Karazhanova	“1000 дней”	7th	3rd
7	Azerbaijan	Selin Iskenderova	“Птица счастья”	12th	13th
8	Mauritius	Evanzhelika Batarshina	“I Wanna Dance”	5th	11th
9	Tajikistan	Omina Jabborova	“Модар”	9th	9th
10	Russia	Idar Kotsev	“Вы со мной”	1st	2nd
11	Uzbekistan	Sherbek Shavkatov	"O'zbekiston"	4th	10th
12	Brazil	Davi Cunha Vieira	“Vai, pode ir”	11th	8th
13	Mongolia	Nomuundari Ganzorig	“Bujeerei”	13th	4th

== Detailed voting results ==
The contest's winners were decided by jury vote and public vote. The public vote took place on the contest's official website, and opened on 16 November at 22:00 MSK, closing on 18 November at 14:00 MSK, 2 hours before the live final began.

Place	Jury		Online Vote	
Place	Country	Points	Country	Percentage
1	Russia	190	China	9.69%
2	Armenia	136	Russia	9.41%
3	South Africa	115	Kazakhstan	8.96%
4	Uzbekistan	107	Mongolia	8.32%
5	Mauritius	99	Armenia	8.00%
6	Belarus	92	South Africa	7.91%
7	Kazakhstan	88	Belarus	7.71%
8	Kyrgyzstan	82	Brazil	7.38%
9	Tajikistan	72	Tajikistan	7.05%
10	China	63	Uzbekistan	7.02%
11	Brazil	58	Mauritius	6.52%
12	Azerbaijan	48	Kyrgyzstan	6.47%
13	Mongolia	33	Azerbaijan	5.84%

Detailed voting results of the final
Voting procedure used: 100% Online vote 100% Jury vote		Jury vote score	Online vote score	Jury vote												
Voting procedure used: 100% Online vote 100% Jury vote		Jury vote score	Online vote score	China	Armenia	Kyrgyzstan	Belarus	South Africa	Kazakhstan	Azerbaijan	Mautirius	Tajikistan	Russia	Uzbekistan	Brazil	Mongolia
Competing countries	China	63	9.69%		5	3	1	4	4	11	15	7	4	1	5	3
Competing countries	Armenia	136	8.00%	20		6	3	20	11	3	6	11	20	20	9	7
Competing countries	Kyrgyzstan	82	6.47%	2	11		8	8	7	5	2	5	9	8	6	11
Competing countries	Belarus	92	7.71%	6	8	8		9	8	6	4	6	8	15	8	6
Competing countries	South Africa	115	7.91%	1	7	11	5		9	15	20	9	11	5	7	15
Competing countries	Kazakhstan	88	8.96%	9	6	7	11	6		9	8	4	5	6	15	2
Competing countries	Azerbaijan	48	5.84%	7	1	4	4	5	2		3	3	3	7	4	5
Competing countries	Mauritius	99	6.52%	3	4	5	7	7	15	2		8	15	9	20	4
Competing countries	Tajikistan	72	7.05%	5	2	1	15	11	3	4	11		6	4	2	8
Competing countries	Russia	190	9.41%	15	9	20	20	15	20	20	9	20		11	11	20
Competing countries	Uzbekistan	107	7.02%	11	15	15	9	2	6	8	7	15	7		3	9
Competing countries	Brazil	58	7.38%	8	20	9	6	1	1	1	5	2	1	3		1
Competing countries	Mongolia	33	8.32%	4	3	2	2	3	5	7	1	1	2	2	1	

=== 20 points ===
Below is a summary of all 20 points received from each country's professional juries.

20 Points awarded by juries
#	Recipient	Countries awarding 20 points
6	Russia	Azerbaijan, Belarus, Kazakhstan, Kyrgyzstan, Mongolia, Tajikistan
4	Armenia	China, Russia, South Africa, Uzbekistan
1	Brazil	Armenia
1	Mauritius	Brazil
1	South Africa	Mauritius
