= Yury Petrov (politician, born 1947) =

Russian politician

Yury Petrov MP
- Юрий Петров
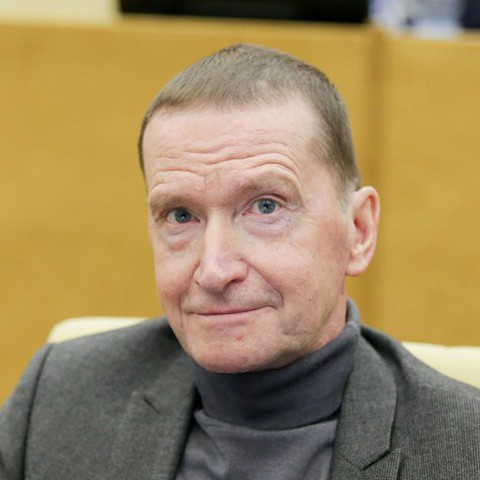
- Petrov in 2021

Member of the State Duma (Party List Seat)
- Incumbent
- Assumed office 27 October 2021
- Preceded by: Alexander Avdeyev
- In office 21 December 2011 – 12 October 2021

Head of Rosimushchestvo
- In office 26 May 2008 – 18 September 2011
- Preceded by: Valery Nazarov
- Succeeded by: Gleb Nikitin (acting); Olga Dergunova

Personal details
- Born: 10 April 1947 (age 79) Leningrad, RSFSR, USSR
- Party: United Russia
- Spouse: Irina Evgenievna Petrova
- Children: Vasily; Alina; Elena
- Parents: Alexander Timofeevich Petrov (father); Lydia Stepanovna Petrova (mother)
- Education: Leningrad State University
- Occupation: Lawyer

Yury Alexandrovich Petrov (Russian: Юрий Александрович Петров; born 10 April 1947) is a Russian political figure and a deputy of the 8th State Duma. He has the federal state civilian service rank of 1st class Active State Councillor of the Russian Federation.

After graduating from the Leningrad State University, Petrov started working there first as an assistant and later as an associate professor of the Faculty of Law. Simultaneously with that, he was also working as a lawyer in a number of Saint Petersburg law firms. In September 2004, Petrov was appointed deputy chair of the Russian fund of federal property (liquidated in 2008). From 2008 to 2011, he headed the Federal Agency for State Property Management. In 2011, 2016, and 2021 he was elected deputy of the 6th, 7th, and 8th State Dumas, respectively.

== Sanctions ==
He was sanctioned by the UK government in 2022 in relation to the Russo-Ukrainian War.
