= Valery Nazarov =

Russian politician

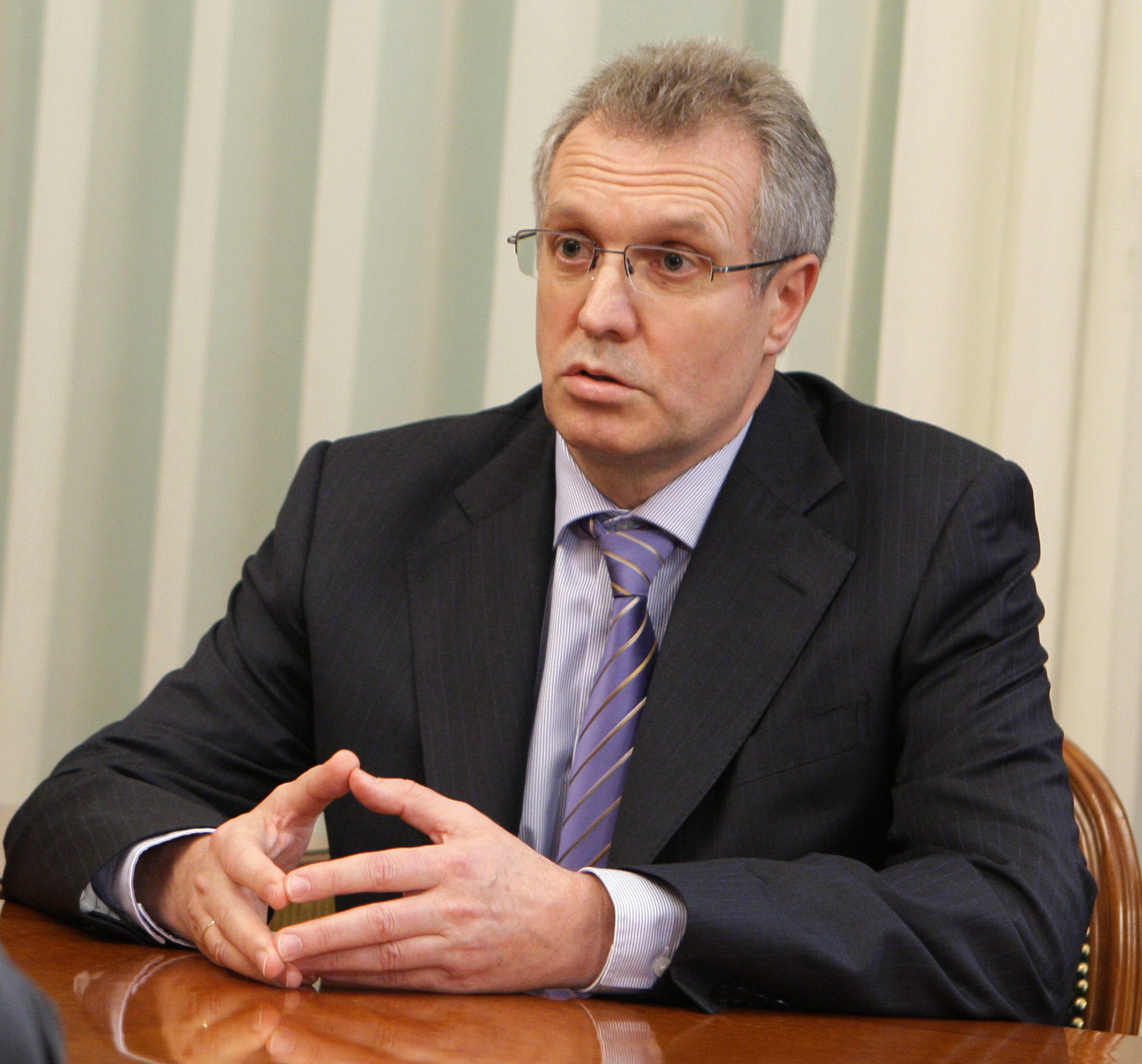
Nazarov in 2010

Valery Lvovich Nazarov (Russian: Валерий Львович Назаров; born September 11, 1955) is a Russian official and politician. He has the federal state civilian service rank of 1st class Active State Councillor of the Russian Federation.

== Biography ==
In 1972–1973 Nazarov worked as a turner.

He studied at the Naval School of Tallinn until 1975, in which he "carefully attended all the Komsomol meetings". In 1975–1981 Nazarov was a Komsomol worker in Michurinsk Southeast railway station department (1977–1978). Nazarov actively collaborated with the KGB, keeping track of Baltic dissidents.

He held senior positions in the Ministry of Communications of Estonia (1981–1994).

Nazarov graduated in extramural studies at Leningrad Electrotechnical Institute of Communications with the speciality of "Multichannel electrical communication "(1985) and the Institute of Public Administration SZKTS in "State and Municipal Management" (1993).

He was a head of the Registration and Information Department; a deputy general director of St. Petersburg State "Urban Housing Agency" (1994–1995). He worked (1995–1999) under the chief of the State institutions of justice "City Bureau of the Registration of Rights to Real Estate" Mikhail Manevich (killed in 1997).

Nazarov graduated from the Russian Academy of Public Services with the speciality of "Jurisprudence" (1998). He participated in the development of the Federal Law "On State Registration of Rights to Real Estate and Transactions" (1997) and "Rules of the Unified State Register of Rights to Immovable Property and Transactions" (1998).

From October 12, 1999, to November 10, 2003, Nazarov headed the City Property Management Committee of the Saint Petersburg City Administration (KUGA). Nazarov was promoted at the second attempt (the first time St. Petersburg parliament voted against it). From June 29, 2000, to November 10, 2003, he was also a vice governor of Saint Petersburg.

Nazarov's attempt to gain control of the Petrovsky Stadium, which belonged to the Zenit football club, made headlines in the media. Management of the club went to court, which, after a long trial resolved the case in favour of the City Property Management Committee, headed by Nazarov.

In 2000 he defended his dissertation on "State regulation of the real estate market in large city conditions on the basis of economic valuation."

In the summer of 2001 deputies of the local Legislative Assembly challenged vice governor Nazarov with a no-confidence vote. The cause was a scandal involving the sale of city property. One of the initiators of the vote of the Legislative Assembly, Deputy Alexei Kovalev, said that Nazarov "misled the public". Despite the no-confidence vote, Nazarov retained the position and the media attributed this fact to the influence of Vladimir Pekhtin, the head of the "Unity" parliamentary faction.

In 2000–2003 – as a vice governor of St. Petersburg – chairman of KUGA, he was responsible for the activities of the Committee of Land Resources and chaired the city's Commission of Property of the Government of St. Petersburg. A member of the Board of the Ministry of Property Relations of the Russian Federation (since 2000), he participated in the creation of a new concept of Real Estate Management in St. Petersburg (approved in 2001).

From January 11 – March 12, 2004, he was the Chief of the Control Directorate of the Russian presidential administration appointed by President Vladimir Putin. From March 12, 2004, until May 2008, he was the Head of the Russian Federal Agency for Federal Property Management (Rosimushchestvo). He had four deputies. Two of them, Lyudmila Pridanova and Sergey Sysoev, were his deputies also when Nazarov served as the Chairman of the Saint Petersburg City Property Management Committee. He was replaced by Yury Petrov in May 2008.

On May 25, 2004, the Irkutsk Regional Prosecutor's Office filed a case against Nazarov over the non-fulfilment of legal requirements regarding intervention into the situation in the Kirensk and Alexeyevsk ship maintenance bases. Workers on those bases had not received their wages for months and as a protest they had blocked navigation on Lena River for six days.

Nazarov has authored articles and scientific publications on problems connected with the establishment of regional and urban systems of registration of rights to real estate; he has also developed a specialized information and communication system. Since June 29, 2004, he has been a member of the board of directors of Russian Railways.

He is Russian State Councilor of the First Class (2007), academician of St. Petersburg Academy of Engineering, the chairman of the Commission on Property of the Government of St. Petersburg, a member of the Advisory Council for the Real Estate of the State Duma of the Federal Assembly of the Russian Federation.

From February 10, 2010, he was the a head of "Rosagroleasing".

== Accusations of corruption ==
According to the newspaper "Moscow News", Nazarov was a member in "Sobchak's list" which was an unofficial list of officials in 1995, who had the right to buy elite state housing at 5 times lower than the cost.

According to "Novaya Gazeta", a four-year enterprise of Valeryi Nazarov's as head of the City Property Management Committee "was accompanied by a variety of scandals", in particular related to "questionable" transactions in the selling of municipal property. The loss to the city's budget amounted to about four billion roubles because of one transaction. In accordance with the report of the Chairman of Accounts Chamber Sergey Stepashin, headed by Valery Nazarov, KUGA sold "for nothing" a 40 percent block of shares in the five-star Europa Hotel. Stepashin noted that "it was not at a cost of a whole package of shares of the hotel, and at best it was only one of its numbers".

According to the Kommersant newspaper, Nazarov organized a "long war" after the entry of officials to the Board of Directors of OAO "Sea Port of Saint-Petersburg".

According to the deputy Igor Artemyev, the activity of KUGA under the administration of Nazarov was characterized as "lacking transparency" and "carrying out illegal actions".

From April 1, 2011 Rosagroleasing, under the leadership of Nazarov, began selling equipment to farmers, to which the government allocated 3.7 billion roubles. Part of the equipment already purchased by farmers did not reach them. Investigating Rosagroleasing, the Russian Prosecutor General's Office found that the items which were bought, were illegally given to other companies in the leasing, the same items having been sold twice, violating the requirements of Art. 895 of the Civil Code of the Russian Federation and the terms of the contract. In late April, Nazarov officially admitted that 158 units of equipment from a provided 6150 "were missing". Explaining the incident, the Deputy of the State Duma, Vladimir Semenov, called it a "corrupt relationship".

Political offices
Preceded by Andrey Likhachyov	Chairman of the City Property Management Committee of the Saint Petersburg City Administration; October 12, 1999, – November 10, 2003	Succeeded by Igor Mikhaylovich
Preceded by Yevgeny Lisov	Chief of the Control Directorate of the Russian presidential administration January 11, – March 12, 2004	Succeeded by Alexander Beglov
Preceded by Farit Gazizullin	Head of Rosimushchestvo; March 12, 2004 – May 2008	Succeeded by Yury Petrov
