= Surgutneftegas =

Russian oil and gas company

Surgutneftgas
- Native name: ПАО «Сургутнефтегаз»
- Company type: Public limited company
- Traded as: MCX: SNGS; LSE: SGGD
- Industry: Oil and gas
- Founded: 1993; 33 years ago
- Headquarters: Surgut, Russia
- Key people: Vladimir Bogdanov (CEO)
- Products: Petroleum; Natural gas Oil products
- Revenue: $20.1 billion (2017)
- Operating income: $3.89 billion (2016)
- Net income: −$932 million (2016)
- Total assets: $58.5 billion (2016)
- Total equity: $51.4 billion (2016)
- Number of employees: 92,935
- Subsidiaries: Kinef
- Website: www.surgutneftegas.ru/en/

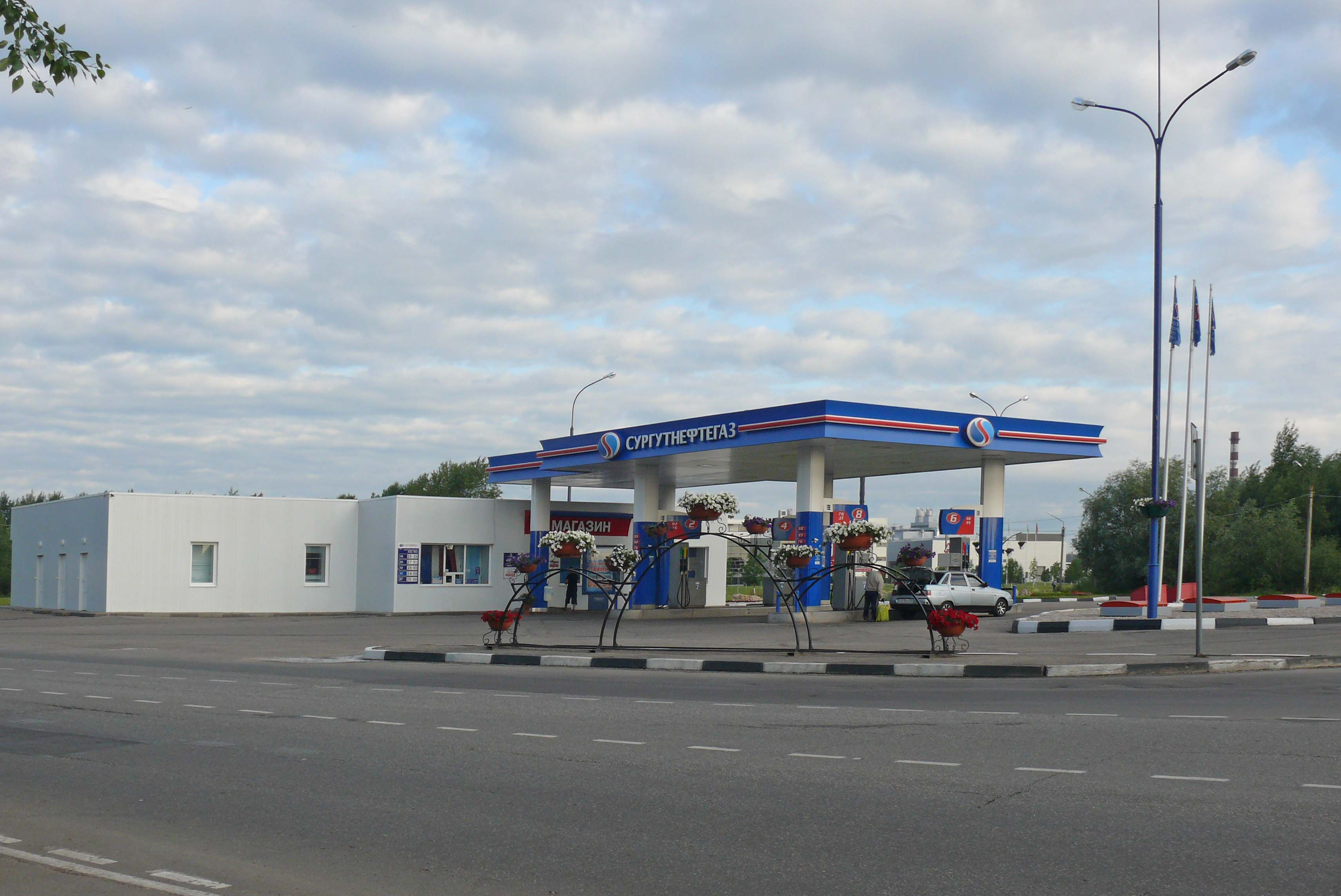
Petrol station of Surgutneftegas in Veliky Novgorod

Surgutneftegas (Russian: ПАО «Сургутнефтегаз», IPA: [sʊrɡʊtnʲɪftʲɪˈɡas]) is a Russian oil and gas company created by merging several previously state-owned companies owning large oil and gas reserves in Western Siberia. The company's headquarters are located in Surgut, Khanty-Mansi Autonomous Okrug. In the 2020 Forbes Global 2000, Surgutneftgas was ranked as the 251st-largest public company in the world.

Surgutneftegas includes a large oil refinery in Kirishi, Leningrad Oblast, operated by the Kirishinefteorgsintez subsidiary. The company is also engaged in fuel retail activities in north-west Russia by cooperating with the Petersburg Fuel Company. Surgutneftegas is also a shareholder of Oneximbank (Объединённый экспортно-импортный банк). From the beginning, Surgutneftegas has been led by president and director general Vladimir Bogdanov, who had run the Surgut oil fields since 1983.

According to Stanislav Belkovsky, Vladimir Putin is the beneficial owner of Surguneftegas.

== History ==
Surgutneftegas was established in 1994 as a joint-stock company. In 1995, the company won a tender for huge oil fields in the Khanty–Mansi Autonomous Okrug. The company also gained permission to build an export terminal in the Batareynaya Bay of the Gulf of Finland and a pipeline between it and the Kirishi oil refinery.

Surgutneftegas was widely believed to be behind Baikalfinansgrup which acquired YUKOS' main oil production facility Yuganskneftegaz at a controversial auction in 2004.

== Operations ==
Surgutneftegas is the leading oil supplier to Belarus, accounting in 2006 for some 30% of the total deliveries. The company also developed its foreign contacts, including talks with Iran, Libya, and pre-war Iraq on taking part in oil extraction projects.

According to the Hoover company review, Surgutneftegas employs more than 82,000 people and generated $24 billion in sales in 2007. In 2018, the company's revenue amounted to 1.5 trillion rubles.

== Kirish oil refinery ==
The Kirish oil refinery, also known as Kirishnefteorgsintez, was constructed by the Soviet Union and subsequently incorporated into OOO Surgutneftegas, where it was renamed OOO Industrial Enterprise Kirishnefteorgsintez (OOO KINEF) in 1993. Construction of the Kirishi oil refinery was launched in 1961 in the town of Kirishi, Leningrad Region. The first phase of the refinery was commissioned in March 1966. The refinery was designed to cover the fuel needs of the north-western region of the Soviet Union. The conversion level of the refinery was not very high, resulting in a high degree of masut (residue) production. The latter was also delivered to the Baltic states, Belarus, and Ukraine.

In 1980, the plant underwent reconstruction and began operating a diesel hydrotreating unit with a capacity of 2 million tonnes per year. The central fractionation tower K-5, weighing 335.2 tons, with a diameter of 5 m and a length of 62 m, was delivered by "Spetstyazhavtotrans" from the factory "Dzerzhinskhimmash".

== See also ==
- List of oil exploration and production companies
- Petroleum industry in Russia
