= Vladimir Bogdanov =

Russian businessman (born 1951)

- Владимир Богданов
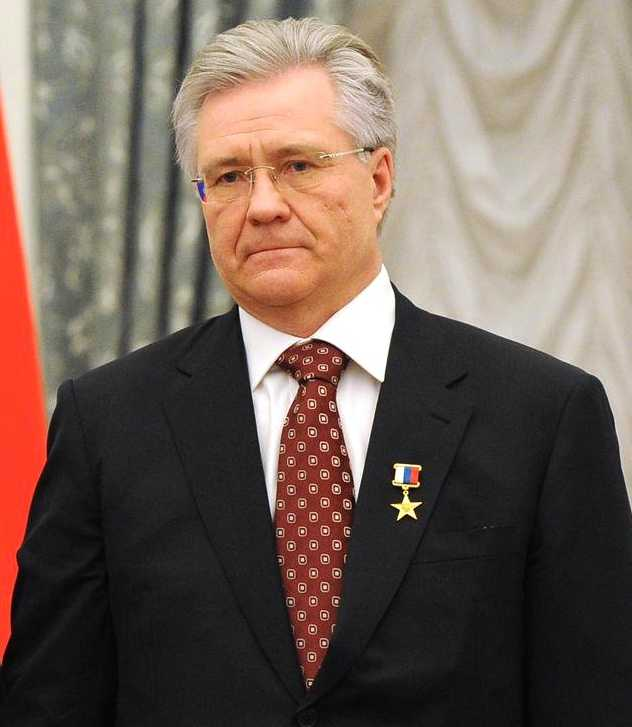
- Bogdanov in 2016
- Born: Vladimir Leonidovich Bogdanov; May 28, 1951 (age 75); Suerka Village, Uporovsky District, Tyumen Oblast, Russian SFSR, Soviet Union
- Education: Tyumen Industrial Institute
- Occupation: Businessman
- Title: Hero of Labour of the Russian Federation (2016)
- Awards: Order "For Merit to the Fatherland" (2nd class); Order "For Merit to the Fatherland" (3rd class); Order "For Merit to the Fatherland" (4th class); Order of Honour; Order of the Red Banner of Labour; Order of the Badge of Honour; Order of Honor (Belarus)

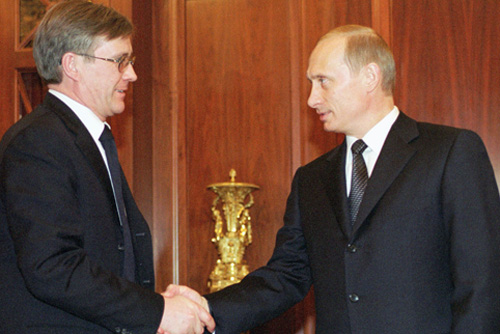
Vladimir Bogdanov with Vladimir Putin in 2002

Vladimir Leonidovich Bogdanov (Russian: Влади́мир Леони́дович Богда́нов; born 28 May 1951) is a Russian businessman and oil tycoon.

== Biography and career ==
In 1973, he graduated from Tyumen Industrial Institute with a degree in oil and gas and since then has worked in oil industry in Tyumen Oblast, mainly in Surgutneftegas. Since 1993, he is the President of Surgutneftegas, one of the largest Russian oil companies. In 1978-80 he occupied leading positions in Yuganskneftegaz. Since 1984 he has been the Director General of Surgutneftegas, which became a private company in 1993. In June 2001 Forbes claimed that Bogdanov was the third wealthiest Russian with $1.6 billion. He has been a member of the Khanty-Mansi legislature since 1996.

Bogdanov was also a confidant of Sergey Sobyanin during the successful 2001 Tyumen Oblast Governor election and of Vladimir Putin during the 2004 Russian Presidential Election.

=== Sanctions ===
In April 2018, the United States imposed sanctions on him and 23 other Russian nationals.

In April 2022, in response to the Russian invasion of Ukraine, Bogdanov was added to the European Union sanctions list "in response to the ongoing unjustified and unprovoked Russian military aggression against Ukraine and other actions undermining or threatening the territorial integrity, sovereignty and independence of Ukraine".

He was sanctioned by the UK government in 2022 in relation to the Russo-Ukrainian War.

== Honours and awards ==
- Order "For Merit to the Fatherland":
  - 2nd class (28 May 2006) - for outstanding contribution to the development of fuel-energy complex and long conscientious work
  - 3rd class (5 June 2001) - for outstanding contribution to the development of oil and gas industry and many years of diligent work
  - 4th class (14 October 1997) - for services to the state, many years of hard work and great contribution to strengthening friendship and cooperation between nations
- Order of the Red Banner of Labour
- Order of the Badge of Honour
