= Krasnyi Bor dump site =

Coordinates: 59°42′19″N 30°42′46″E

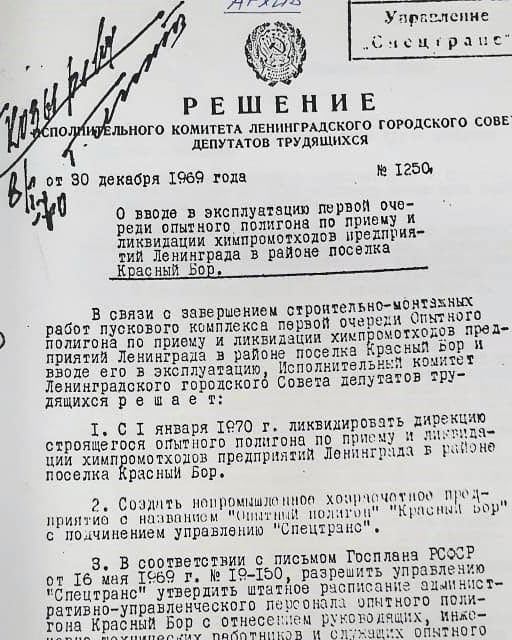
The decision of the executive committee of the Leningrad City Council of People's Deputies on the creation of the "Experimental landfill (chemical waste) Krasny Bor" with subordination to Spetstrans, 1969

The Krasnyi Bor dump site is a hazardous waste landfill site in Krasny Bor, Tosnensky District, Leningrad Oblast, Russia. The site is sometimes called the "chemical Chernobyl", due to the two million tons of chemical waste accumulated there.

== The site ==
The Krasny Bor landfill is located about 30 km to the southeast of Saint Petersburg. The site, spanning 73 hectares (180 acres), was brought into use in 1970.

Two million tons of waste in Krasnyi Bor are stored in pools, many of which have no cover. The area is surrounded with barbed wire, but outside the fencing there is a channel, into which rain water and waste collects. With the rain and meltwater, poisons from the uncovered pools flow into this channel.

The facility is formally under the authority of St. Petersburg.

Next to the dumping site there are two rivers, the Izhora River and the Tosna River, which empty into the Neva River.

== Environmental concerns ==
In 2018, the site was characterized as a "dangerous environmental bomb" by Russia's presidential envoy in the Northwestern Federal District, Alexander Beglov. The Baltic Marine Environment Protection Commission (HELCOM) has called it as a particularly polluted area, which will present a serious threat to the Baltic Sea. If waters from the Krasnyi Bor pools should escape, or if the dykes should break, the hazardous waste will end up in the Gulf of Finland. In early March 2016, such a dyke did break, but the leak was detected and blocked up quickly.

The machinery of the facility is old, it is inefficient, and according to former head of the facility Kolyakov, if functions only when the temperature is not freezing. In addition to this, problems are caused by the fact that the wasted has been dumped into the pools without any kind of separation of the waste materials.

In the spring of 2016, Helsingin Sanomat reported that the Krasnyi Bor dumping site was in a critical state, as the pools containing industrial waste were almost full. The situation is dangerous for the city of St. Petersburg, too, since it takes it water supply from the Neva, below the place where the Izhora River empties into it.

In March 2016, Helsingin Sanomat took samples of the water near the dumping ground. The following substances were found in a ditch near it: PCB compounds, cadmium, heavy metals, cyanide, arsenic, as well as the pesticide HCH, signs of solvents and pesticides such as the herbicide MCPA. It has also been claimed that the dumping site contains radioactive waste. The authorities of St. Petersburg claim that all this is false and without basis.

The head of the harmful waste from the Finnish Environment Institute SYKE, Jaakko Mannio says that the fact that hazardous substances were found outside the dumping site is an indication of a leak.

The problems of the dumping site were publicized by the former director Viktor Kolyakov, who was dismissed five months after the revelations. After this, the city of St. Petersburg has threatened to have him prosecuted for “spreading unfounded information.”

The Russian State Prosecutor office has investigated the functioning of the dumping site in 2016. Kolyakov's predecessor is suspected of having exceeded his authority. Connected to the dumping site, there are also cases pending concerning stealing funds from budget of the city of St. Petersburg.

In 2015, the city of St. Petersburg wanted to build an incinerator, which would have been designed by a Russian daughter company of the Finnish consulting and engineering company Pöyry. However, the residents and politicians of the Leningrad Oblast were opposed to the idea of waste being incinerated there, and the plan came to naught. The city has no alternative plan of how to process the waste.
