= Vyacheslav Makarov =

Russian politician

- Вячеслав Макаров
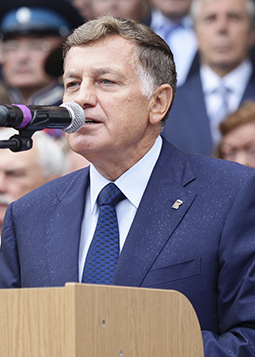
- Makarov in 2015

Deputy of the 8th State Duma
- Incumbent
- Assumed office 19 September 2021

Personal details
- Born: 7 May 1955 (age 71) Krutchenskaya Baigora, Lipetsk Oblast, Russian Soviet Federative Socialist Republic, USSR
- Party: United Russia
- Education: Rostov Military Institute of Rocket Troops

Vyacheslav Makarov (Russian: Вячеслав Серафимович Макаров; born 7 May 1955) is a Russian political figure and a deputy of the 8th State Duma. In 1984, Makarov was granted a Candidate of Sciences in History degree.

In September 2003, Makarov was elected deputy of the Legislative Assembly of Saint Petersburg. In 2005, he was elected deputy secretary of the political council of the regional branch of the United Russia party in St. Petersburg. In 2007 and 2016, Makarov was re-elected for the Legislative Assembly of Saint Petersburg of the 4th and 6th convocations. Since September 2021, he has served as deputy of the 8th State Duma.

On 24 March 2022, the United States Treasury sanctioned him in response to the 2022 Russian invasion of Ukraine.
