= List of Vladimir Putin legislation and programs =

During his presidency Vladimir Putin proposed 227 legislative acts of the Russian Federation (as of 18 January 2007).

== Legislation proposed by Putin, approved by the Federal Assembly of Russia, and signed by Putin ==
=== First term ===
- Proposed on 19 May 2000, signed on 29 July 2000: Authorization of the president to dismiss the heads of Federal subjects of Russia. (Federal Law On Modifications and Additions to the Federal Law On General Principles of the Organization of Legislative (Representative) and Executive Bodies of State Power of the Subjects of the Russian Federation.)
- Proposed on 19 May 2000, signed on August 5, 2000: The heads of the legislative and executive Bodies of the Federal subjects of Russia are replaced with representatives of these bodies as Members of the Federation Council of Russia. (Federal Law On the Formation of the Federation Council of the Federal Assembly of the Russian Federation.)
- Proposed on 15 January 2000, signed on 25 December 2000: It changes the Russian anthem to a version based on the musical score of the pre-1991 Soviet anthem. (Federal Constitutional Law On the State Anthem of the Russian Federation.)
- Proposed on 30 August 2000, signed on 12 February 2001: Federal Law On Guarantees for Former Presidents and Their Families
- Proposed on 15 January 2001, signed on 22 March 2001: It approves the new text of the anthem written by Sergey Mikhalkov. (Federal Constitutional Law On Modifications and an Addition to the Federal Law On the State Anthem of the Russian Federation)
- Proposed on 25 May 2001, signed on 15 December 2001: It introduces disciplinary and administrative responsibility of judges. (Federal Law On Modifications and Additions to the Federal Law On the Status of Judges in the Russian Federation)
- Proposed on 28 August 2001, signed on 12 June 2002: It prohibits to conduct a referendum within the last year of a term of the president or State Duma and disallows mass media to comment on election campaign. (Federal Law On Basic Guarantees of Suffrage and Right of Referendum of the Citizens of the Russian Federation. Full text in English: )
- Proposed on 29 April 2002, signed on 25 July 2002: These regulations define the notion of extremism and establish measures to counter it, including procedures of suspension of political parties, public and religious associations. (Federal Law On Modifications and Additions to the Russian Federation’s Legislation in Connection with the Passing of the Federal Law On Countering Extremist Activities and Federal Law On Countering Extremist Activities (Full text in English:)
- Proposed on 12 September 2002, signed on 10 January 2003: It considerably changes regulations concerning the nomination procedure and requires the nominees of political parties that are represented in the State Duma to collect two million signatures in support of their registration rather than one million required before. (Federal Law On the Election of the President of the Russian Federation. Full text in English:)
- Proposed on 4 January 2003, signed on 6 October 2003:It establishes a limited list of powers of the local self-government and defines the circumstances under which they have to be delegated to executive power bodies of the Federal subject. (Federal Law On General Principles of Organization of the Local Self-Government in the Russian Federation)
- Proposed on 31 January 2003, signed on 4 July 2003: It establishes that a mass media can be suspended if it violates election legislation twice during an election campaign. (Federal Law On Modifications and Additions to Some Legislative Acts of the Russian Federation in Connection with the Passing of the Federal Law On Basic Guarantees of Suffrage and Right of Referendum of the Citizens of the Russian Federation)
- Proposed on 19 February 2004, signed on 25 March 2004: It merges the Perm Oblast and Komi-Permyak Autonomous District into the Perm Krai. (Federal Constitutional Law On Formation of a New Subject of the Russian Federation within the Russian Federation as a Result of Unification of Perm Region and Komi-Permyak Autonomous Area.)

=== Second term ===
- Proposed on 28 September 2004, signed on 11 December 2004: It replaces the direct election of the heads of the Federal subjects of Russia with a system whereby they are proposed by the President and approved or disapproved by the legislative power bodies of the federal subjects. (Federal Law On Modifications to the Federal Law On General Principles of the Organization of Legislative (Representative) and Executive Bodies of State Power of the Subjects of the Russian Federation and the Federal Law On Basic Guarantees of Suffrage and Right of Referendum of the Citizens of the Russian Federation)
- Proposed on 8 December 2004, signed on 4 April 2005: It institutes the Public Chamber of Russia. (Federal Law On the Public Chamber of the Russian Federation)
- Proposed on 8 December 2004, signed on 18 May 2005: It establishes that the State Duma will be elected by closed party-list proportional voting only, entirely eliminating the single-member district plurality voting system that accounted for half of the 450 seats before, and raises electoral threshold from 5 to 7%. (Federal Law On the Election of Deputies of the State Duma of the Federal Assembly of the Russian Federation)
- Proposed on 14 April 2005, signed on 21 July 2005: It considerably toughens formal requirements for nomination, allows electronic voting, makes funding the parties participating in the State Duma receive from the government ten times higher and establishes that a member of the State Duma loses his/her seat as (s)he leaves his/her faction. (Federal Law On Modifications to the Russian Federation’s Legislation on Elections and Referendums as well as other Legislative Acts.)
- Proposed on 29 June 2005, signed on 14 October 2005: It makes the Taimyr Autonomous District and Evenki Autonomous District parts of the Krasnoyarsk Krai. (Federal Constitutional Law On Formation of a New Subject of the Russian Federation within the Russian Federation as a Result of Unification of Krasnoyarsk Krai and Taimyr (Dolgan-Nenets) Autonomous District and Evenki Autonomous District.)
- Proposed on 26 September 2005, signed on 27 December 2005: It regulates the parliamentary investigation and prohibits parliamentary investigation of the activities of the President, court and investigative authorities if they comply to the processual law. Also it establishes that no parliamentary investigation should last longer than a year and that the cases processed by a court should not be subject to it. (Federal Law On Parliamentary Investigation by the Federal Assembly of the Russian Federation)
- Proposed on 23 May 2006, signed on 12 July 2006: It merges the Kamchatka Oblast and Koryak Autonomous District into the Kamchatka Krai. (Federal Constitutional Law On Formation of a New Subject of the Russian Federation within the Russian Federation as a Result of Unification of Kamchatka Oblast and Koryak Autonomous District)
- Proposed on 8 November 2006, signed on 30 December 2006: It makes the Ust-Orda Buryat Autonomous District part of the Irkutsk Oblast. (Federal Constitutional Law On Formation of a New Subject of the Russian Federation within the Russian Federation as a Result of Unification of Irkutsk Oblast and Ust-Orda Buryat Autonomous District)

== See also ==
- Law of the Russian Federation
- National Priority Projects
- Bibliography of Vladimir Putin
- Bibliography of Russian history (1991–present)
