= Kinef =

Russian production association

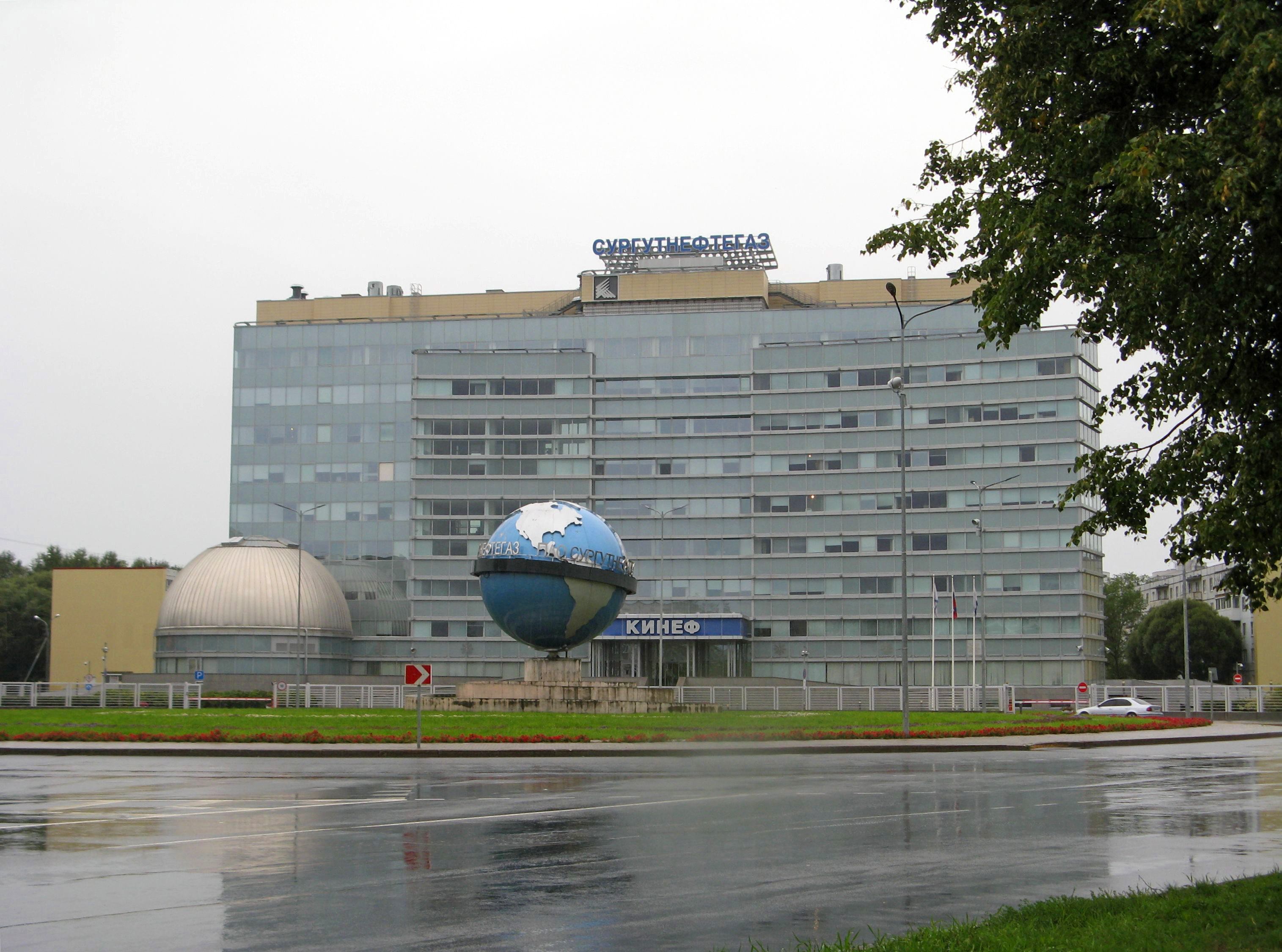
- Kinef headquarters offices in Kirishi

- Location within Leningrad Oblast Location within European Russia
- Interactive map of Kinef
- Location: Kirishi, Russia; 59°29′21″N 32°04′38″E

Refinery details
- Operator: Surgutneftegaz
- Opened: 1966
- Website: kinef.ru

Kinef (Russian: КИНЕФ), an abbreviation for Kirishi Petroleum Organic Synthesis (Russian: Киришинефтеоргсинтез, romanized: Kirishinefteorgsintez), also known as Kirishi Refinery, is a Russian joint stock production association operating a large oil refinery based in Kirishi, Leningrad Oblast. It is a subsidiary of Surgutneftegaz. The Kirishi refinery is the only one in Northwestern Russia.

As of September 2025, it is one of Russia's top two refineries, annually refining 17.7 million metric tons of crude oil, corresponding to 6.4% of the country's total.

== History ==
Construction of the refinery had begun in 1961 in an area devastated by World War II. The first oil products were produced in 1966. By 1972, the Kirishi refinery had been one of the five largest in the Soviet Union.

In 1980 the plant was reconstructed and started diesel hydrotreating unit with capacity of two million tonnes per year. The main fractionation tower K-5 weighing 335.2 tons, diameter of 5 m and a length of 62 m was delivered by "Spetstyazhavtotrans" from the factory "Dzerzhinskhimmash".

In 1987 Kirishineftekhimexport subdivision of Kirishinefteorgsintez was founded to conduct external economic activity of the company. In 1991 it became an independent state-owned enterprise, but continued trading for Kirishinefteorgsintez.

In 1993, the refinery became a part of the Surgutneftegaz JSC.

In December 1994, the refinery opened a plant for the production of roofing and waterproofing, sound-proof roll material, as well as bitumen-polymer mastic hot applications. In 1996, a complex for the production of linear alkyl benzene was opened. In 1999, a technical re-gas fractionation plant was opened.

During the 1990s, Andrey Akimov, who was managing director from January 1991 to 20 November 2002 at the Swiss financial company IMAG GmbH in Vienna (Austria), worked closely with the administration of the Governor of St. Petersburg Anatoly Sobchak and especially Vladimir Putin to provide more than $1 billion in foreign finance for the reconstruction of the Kirishi oil refinery (Russian: Киришинефтеоргсинтез), which is the largest oil refinery in Russia based upon the amount of fuel produced.

== Incidents ==
=== Explosion on 29 May 2008 ===
At around 2:30 a.m. on 29 May, an explosion followed by a fire occurred at unit LG-24/7-1200 (diesel fuel hydrotreating). The explosion and subsequent fire were caused by a leak of a hydrogen-containing mixture in the compressor room. The fire was classified as a third-degree emergency and was extinguished within an hour of its outbreak.

As a result of the incident, one person was killed and four others suffered severe burns; despite medical efforts, they could not be saved.

Experts from the Rostekhnadzor were involved in the investigation of the accident.

=== Fire on 5 August 2009 ===
In the morning, a diesel fuel hydrotreater ignited in one of the workshops. No injuries were reported. The fire was extinguished at 11:10 a.m. Moscow time.

According to the regional office of the Ministry of Emergency Situations, a report of a furnace installation fire in the plant’s tank farm was received at 10:32 a.m. Moscow time on 5 August 2009. The blaze, which was classified as a third-degree fire, was contained at 10:58 a.m.

=== Explosion on 25 May 2017 ===
During gas-hazardous maintenance work performed by emergency rescue personnel at the flare line hydraulic seal of Workshop No. 42, an explosion and subsequent fire occurred at 9:30 a.m. The blaze was extinguished by the fire service at 9:55 a.m. Two rescuers were killed on site, while two others suffered severe burns covering 90 and 70 percent of their bodies; they later died of their injuries.

=== Russo-Ukrainian war ===
During the fourth year of Russo-Ukrainian war, Ukrainian forces began to attack the Kirishi Refinery, as part of a increasing number of attacks on Russian oil and gas infrastructure and petroleum transportation infrastructure during 2025–26.

On the night of 8 March 2025, Russian authorities claimed that a drone of the Armed Forces of Ukraine was shot down over the refinery by Russian air defence forces. According to the governor of Leningrad Oblast, Alekandr Drozdenko, debris from the drone damaged "the external structure of one of the storage tanks".

On 14 September 2025, drones attacked and started a fire at the refinery.

On 4 October 2025, drones again attacked the refinery. Governor Drozdenko stated that "a fire broke out in the industrial area, and rescue teams extinguished the blaze". The strike damaged "a critical processing unit responsible for desalting and primary oil distillation—an essential stage in refining that separates crude into usable fuel components."

On 26 March 2026, drones again attacked the Kirishi Refinery, which produces 6.4% of total capacity of Russia, causing explosions and fire.

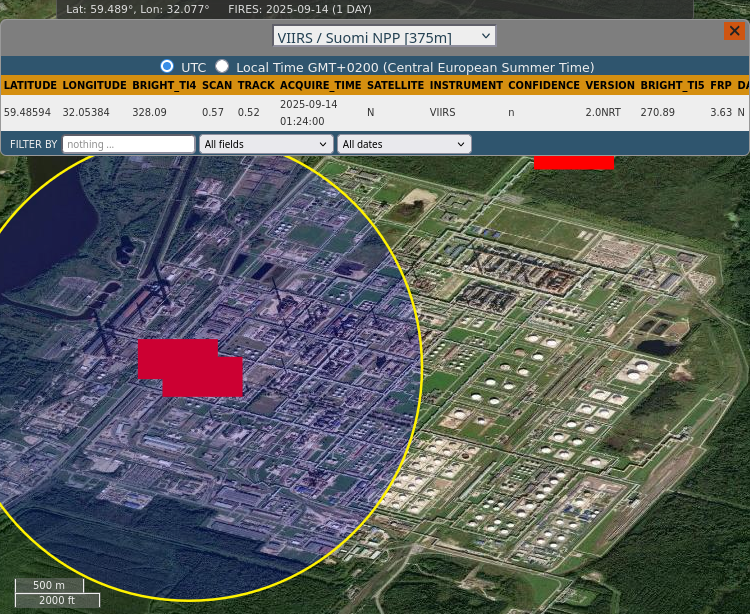
NASA's FIRMS detected fire on 14 September 2025 01:24:00 (UTC) at Kinef (The topmost detection is consistent with a refinery gas flare)

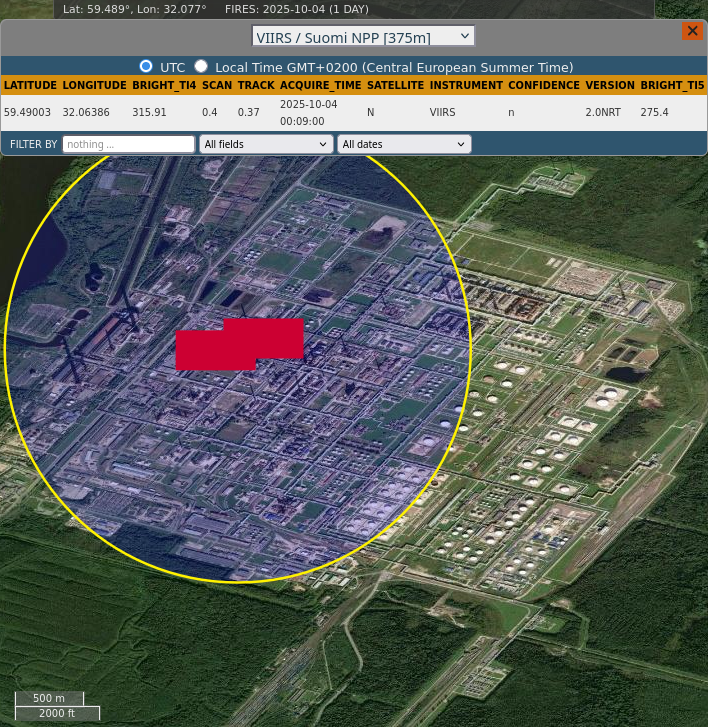
NASA's FIRMS detected fire on 4 October 2025 00:09:00 (UTC) at Kinef

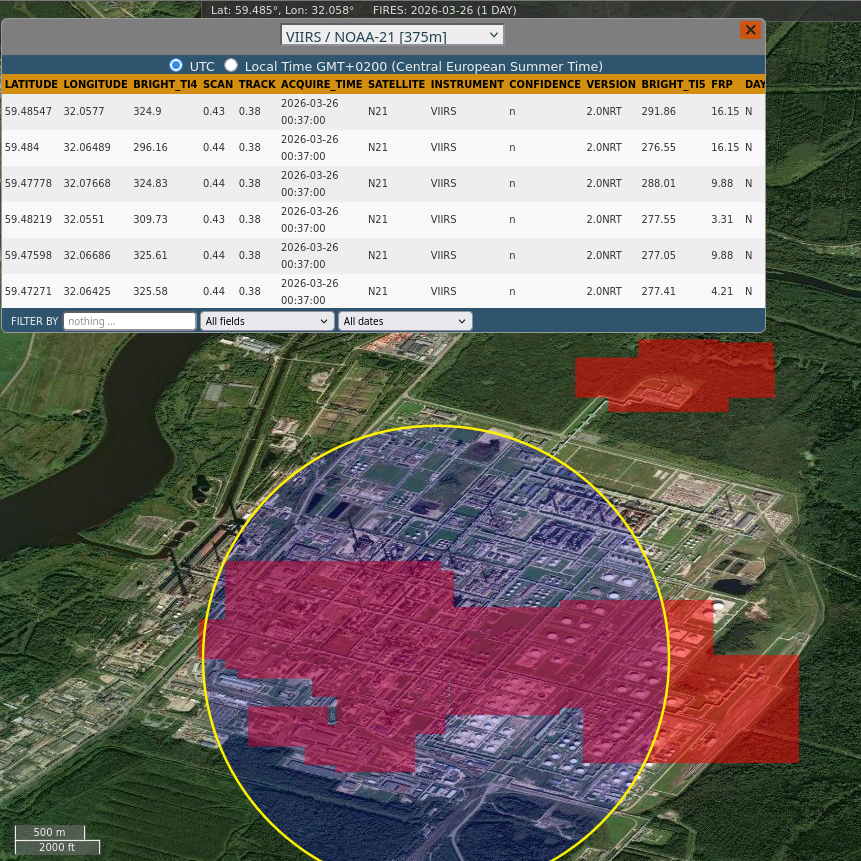
NASA's FIRMS detected extensive fire on 26 March 2026 00:37:00 (UTC) at Kinef (The topmost detection is consistent with refinery gas flares)

== See also ==
- List of oil refineries
- Petroleum industry in Russia
