= Yury Shutov =

Russian politician

Yury Titovich Shutov
- Born: March 16, 1946; Leningrad, USSR
- Died: December 12, 2014 (aged 68); White Swan maximum security prison
- Occupation: ex deputy of Saint Petersburg Legislative Assembly
- Known for: public accusations of Vladimir Putin

Yury Titovich Shutov (Russian: Юрий Титович Шутов, March 16, 1946 – December 12, 2014) was a Russian politician who is known for collecting incriminating evidence against Vladimir Putin at the time when Putin worked as an aid of the former Saint Petersburg Mayor Anatoly Sobchak. Shutov was convicted to life in prison on criminal charges that have been allegedly fabricated to punish him for making public accusations of Putin.

== Conflict with city administration ==
In November 1990 he was an aide to Anatoly Sobchak, Mayor of Leningrad. After being fired, he began collection of evidence about the financial misdeeds by the city administration. He also got a tape with a casual conversation of Sobchak with a French intelligence officer. Putin, who was an aide to Sobchak at this time, decided to intervene. An anti-organized crime unit illegally raided Shutov's apartment and took the tape. When Shutov discovered the "robbers" in his apartment, they broke his skull with a hammer. Shutov published a book about his experience of working in the city administration.

== First arrest ==
On March 31, 1992, Shutov was arrested on fabricated charges of preparing an assassination of Azerbaijan's president Abulfaz Elchibey. He was released only in 1993 and found not guilty by a court in 1996.

== Accusing Putin after election to city parliament ==
On December 20, 1998 Shutov was elected deputy of the Saint Petersburg Legislative Assembly. He alleged in an article that Putin got hold of a file with compromising KGB materials on Sobchak, at the time when Putin worked as the KGB's overseer of Leningrad State University. Putin used this materials to blackmail Sobchak and secure his own appointment in the city administration, according to Shutov.

== Second arrest and abduction from the court room ==
On February 16, 1999, Shutov was stripped of parliamentary immunity and arrested on fabricated charges of murdering prominent Russian politicians Mikhail Manevich and Galina Starovoitova. Court found these charges to be unproven and politically motivated, and he was freed directly in the courtroom on November 16. Several minutes later, masked OMON soldiers who arrived from Moscow, burst to the court room, took Shutov to an office in the same building, and severely beat him. He lost an eye and half of his hearing as a result.

== Conviction ==
Although the Russian Supreme Court ruled that detention of Shutov was illegal and he was reelected to the Saint Petersburg Legislative Assembly (a city parliament) in 2002, he was shuttled during 7 years between different prisons, and finally sentenced to life imprisonment on February 16, 2006, for organizing murders of businessmen (the charges of murdering Starovoitova were dropped).

== Detention and complaints to ECHR ==
On January 19, 2007, a medical commission ordered by the prison authorities concluded that the applicant's condition was of medium gravity and did not warrant his release from prison. However, on March 15, 2007 an independent medical commission studied the applicant's medical file and concluded that the State experts had not conducted an adequate medical examination

Shutov served his sentence in White Swan maximal security prison in the Perm Region where he was not provided with a wheelchair and had to move around by crawling. He died in prison on December 12, 2014.

On September 14, 2010, an application No. 20922/08 (Shutov v. Russia) has been communicated to the European Court of Human Rights (ECHR). He complained of lack of adequate medical care throughout his detention and lack of a wheelchair in prison. Also Mr. Shutov alleged that sentencing him to lifetime imprisonment while he was not present in the courtroom amounts to inhuman treatment. He complains of "unlawful composition of the court in view of the lack of the lay judges' credentials and lack of grounds for their participation in the proceedings after abolition of the institution of lay judges in Russia; of lack of public hearing in view of the court proceedings in a remand prison". Mr. Shutov draws attention upon "unfair trial on account of their removal from the courtroom for the entire duration or part of the proceedings". He alleges that his absence from the courtroom was not remedied by the presence of his legal counsel as the court ignored or dismissed his requests, "pressured the counsel by applying for withdrawal of their license, stripped them of all electronic devices crucial for their work and effectively eliminated the possibility to consult with their clients by holding almost daily hearings". He complains under the same provision that the "trial court was biased, ignored his requests, and that the appeal court failed to duly consider his appeals".

Mr. Shutov complaints that "following his removal from the courtroom he was not aware of the charges against him, could not prepare his defence and could not examine the witnesses"; that "he could not defend himself in person because he was not present either at the trial or at the appeal hearing and that the court did not allow him to retain different legal counsels following termination of his contract with the previous ones". He also complains under Article 18 of ECHR that the real reason for his arrest was political persecution.
