= Lensovet =

City council in Leningrad (1924–1991)

Leningrad City Soviet Ленинградский городской Совет (Russian)
- City council

Type
- Type: Unicameral

History
- Established: 26 January 1924; 101 years ago
- Disbanded: 30 September 1991; 34 years ago
- Preceded by: Petrograd Soviet
- Succeeded by: Legislative Assembly of Saint Petersburg

Structure
- Seats: 400
- Length of term: 5 years

Elections
- Last election: 1990

Meeting place
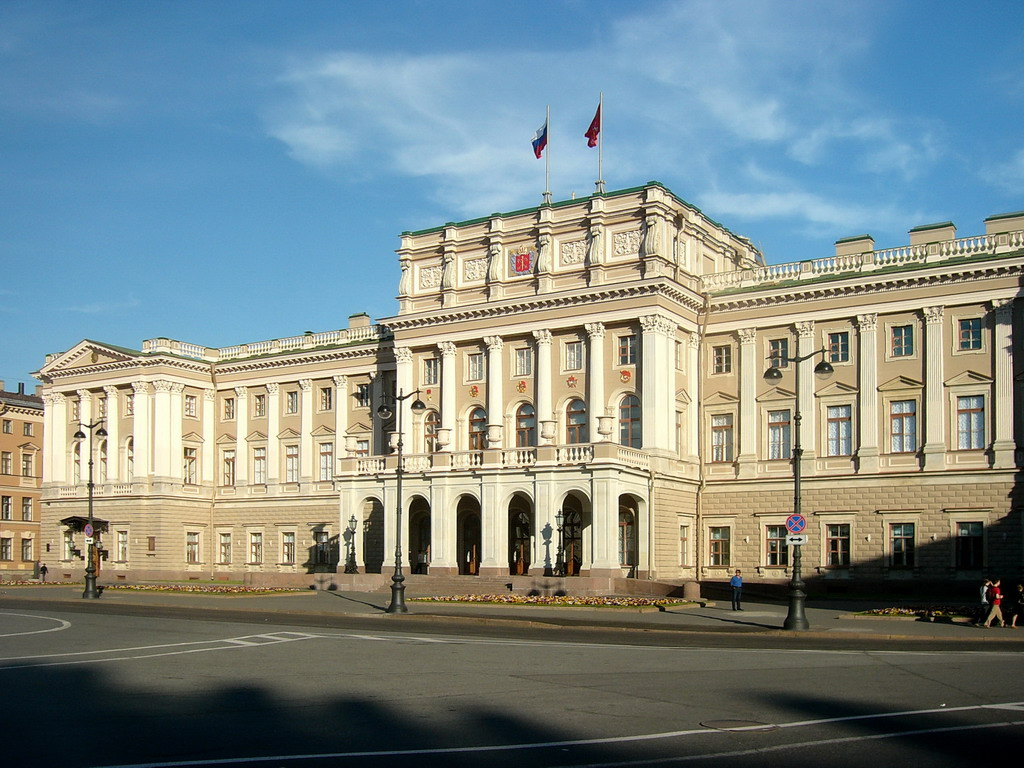
- Lensoviet Building

Leningrad City Soviet (in short Lensovet; Russian: Ленинградский городской Совет, Ленсовет) was the city legislature of Leningrad, Soviet Union.

== History ==
The Leningrad Soviet traces its history back to the Petrograd Soviet of Workers' and Soldiers' Deputies, which was formed on 27 February 1917, during the February Revolution as an organ of revolutionary power.

On 2 August 1920, the 10th Congress of Soviets of the Petrograd Province decided to merge the executive committee of the Petrograd Soviet and the provincial executive committee. The Petrograd Soviet continued its work as the supreme organ of power in the city. The supreme organ of executive power in both the city and the province was the provincial executive committee, which was subordinate to the Petrograd Soviet in the period between provincial congresses of Soviets.

By the decision of the Second All-Union Congress of Soviets of 26 January 1924, Petrograd was renamed Leningrad, and the Petrograd Soviet became known as the Leningrad Soviet of Workers', Peasants', and Red Army Deputies (Lensovet).

According to the resolution of the All-Russian Central Executive Committee and the Council of People's Commissars of the Russian SFSR "On the Formation of the Leningrad Region" of 1 August 1927, the Leningrad Governorate was liquidated, the provincial executive committee transferred its functions to the regional executive committee, to which the presidium of the Leningrad City Council was subordinate.

In accordance with the resolution of the Central Committee of the All-Union Communist Party (Bolsheviks) and the Council of People's Commissars of the Soviet Union of 3 December 1931, Leningrad was allocated as an independent administrative and economic center with its own budget.

In December 1939, elections to the city council were held in accordance with the 1936 Constitution of the Soviet Union, adopted on 5 December 1936. After the elections, the Lensoviet became known as the Leningrad City Council of Workers' Deputies (Lengorsovet).

With the beginning of the Great Patriotic War, it was effectively subordinated to the Military Council of the Leningrad Front, and was engaged in organizing defensive construction on the approaches to Leningrad, converting industry to weapons production, etc. In the spring of 1942, the Leningrad City Council organized the sanitary cleanup of the city after the first winter of the siege.

In May 1944, the Leningrad City Council session adopted a plan for the restoration of the municipal economy. In the second half of the 1940s - early 1950s, the main efforts of the Leningrad City Council were focused on the restoration of the city.

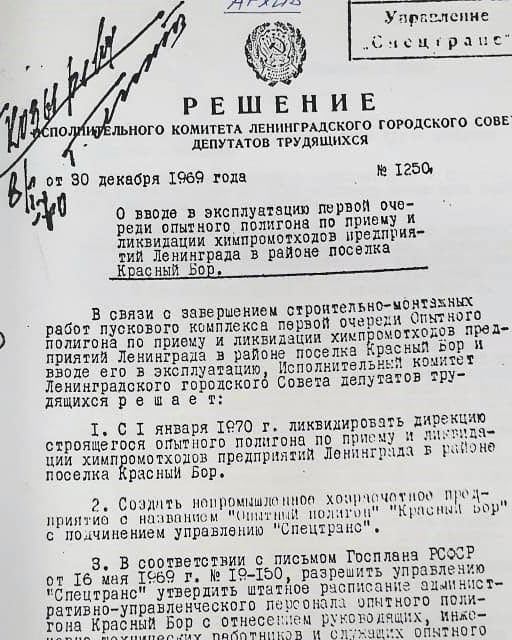
The decision of the executive committee of the Lensovet on the creation of the "Experimental landfill Krasny Bor" with subordination to Spetstrans, 1969

According to the 1977 Constitution of the Soviet Union, the Leningrad City Council of Workers' Deputies became known as the Leningrad City Council of People's Deputies.

Elected as a result of direct elections held in two rounds on 4 and 18 March 1990, the Leningrad City Council of the 21st convocation became the first representative authority in the Russian SFSR where the participants of the democratic forces bloc "Democratic Elections - 90" had an absolute majority - approximately 2/3 in the 400-seat Council. About 120 deputies of the Leningrad City Council represented the Leningrad People's Front - the largest informal political organization in Russia in 1989-90. Over the next three and a half years, the city council determined the life of the city. In particular, it played an important role in organizing resistance to the State Emergency Committee during the August Putsch of 1991.

In connection with the decree of the Presidium of the Supreme Soviet of the Russian SFSR of 6 September 1991 on returning the name St. Petersburg to Leningrad, on 30 September 1991 the city council was renamed the St. Petersburg City Council of People's Deputies (Petrosoviet).

In accordance with the Decrees of the President of Russia "On the phased constitutional reform in the Russian Federation" of 21 September 1993 and "On the reform of representative bodies of local self-government in the Russian Federation" of 9 October 1993, and with paragraph 2 of the Decree of the President of Russia "On the reform of state authorities of the city of St. Petersburg" of 21 December 1993 No. 2252 on the termination of the powers of the St. Petersburg City Council of People's Deputies and its deputies, the session of the City Council on 22 December 1993 adopted a decision to abolish the Council and transfer functions to the Legislative Assembly of Saint Petersburg.

== See also ==
- Leningrad City Committee of the Communist Party of the Soviet Union
- Mossoviet
