= Spetstyazhavtotrans =

- Type: Group of companies
- Industry: Oil, gas, chemical, energy and others
- Founded: 1978
- Headquarters: Moscow, Russia
- Key people: Tropin Sergei (chairman of the board)
- Services: Design, supply, transportation and installation
- Website: www.en.statgk.ru

Spetstyazhavtotrа́ns (Russian: Спецтяжавтотранс, IPA: [spʲɪt͡stʲɪʐəftɐˈtrans]) is a Russian company specializing in the shipment of oversized cargo. The group of companies provides engineering services to the oil, gas, chemical, energy and other industries.

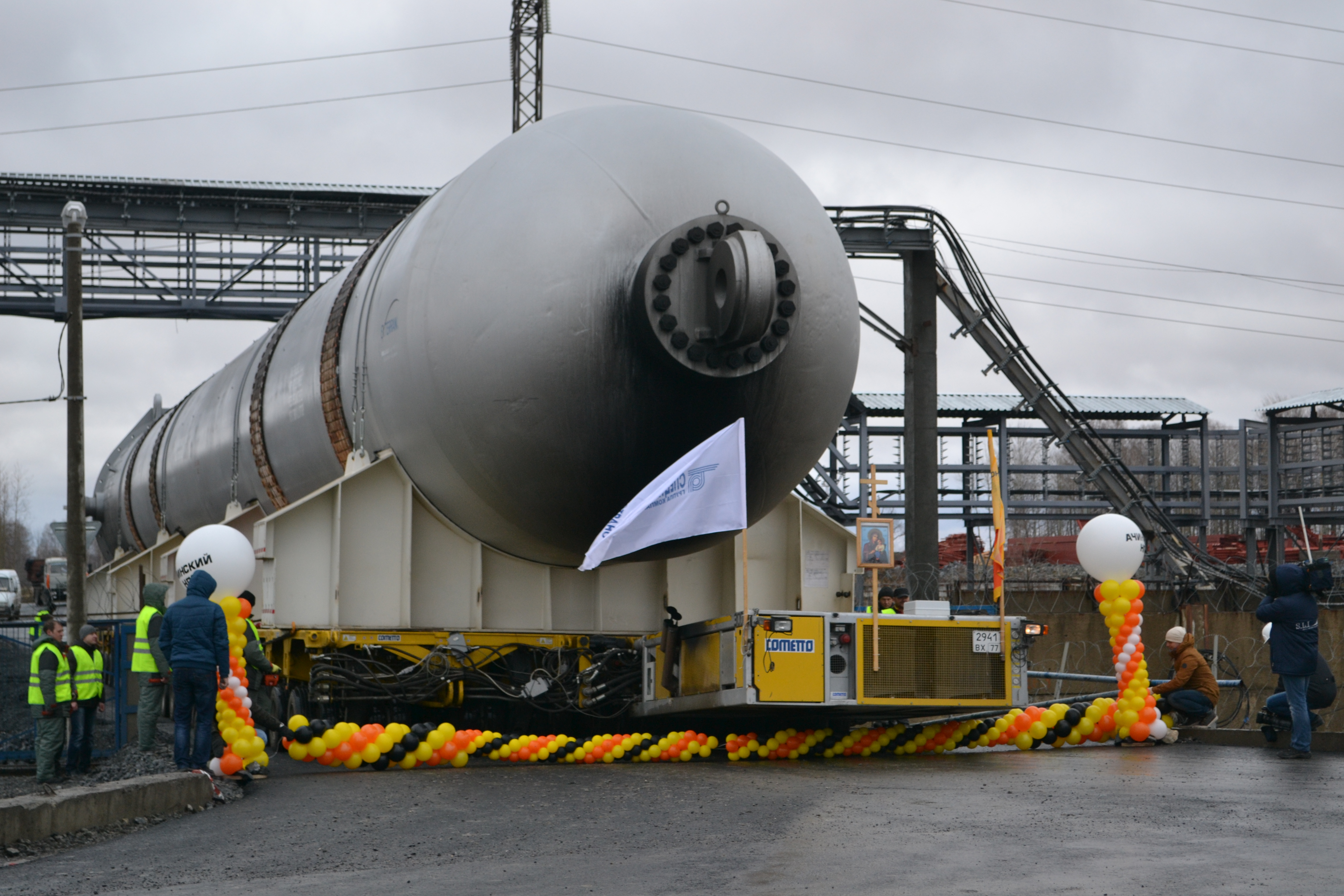
World transport record (1,306 tons), set 28 October 2013

== History ==
=== Timeline ===
- 1974 – Establishment of a committee to prepare proposals for the transportation of oversize energy and industrial equipment
- 24 November 1976 – State Committee on Science and Technology resolution "On ensuring the transportation of large-sized and heavy energy and other industrial equipment and the development of related research"
- 1978 – Resolution 262 of the Council of Ministers of the Soviet Union "Measures to improve the organization of transportation of large and heavy cargo"
- 1978 - Establishment of Spetstyazhavtotrans, a specialized research and production association (SRPA)
- 1978-1988 – Creation of a classification system for the shipment of oversized cargoes of a large mass (OCLM) and methods of calculating the cost-effectiveness of OCLM transportation
- 1978 – Shipment by Minrechflot vessels began
- 1981 – Transportation security agreement for oversize nuclear-power equipment in CMEA countries
- 1982 – Development program for OCLM transportation by specialized vehicles from 1981 to 2000 approved
- 1982-1983 – Research on inland highways from the Caspian Sea
- 1985 – The maritime sector joined the transport of oversize cargo by vehicles and river transport
- 1986 – First oversize transport by air (Аn-124 "Ruslan" airplanes)
- 1988 – Volume of oversize cargo increased to 1,250,000 tons from 353,000 tons in 1981
- 15 April 1991 – Council of Ministers of the RSFSR resolution 10 mandating the RSFSR Ministry of Transport to privatize Spetstyazhavtotrans, SRPA and the State Scientific and Research Institute of Road Transport (SSRIRT) by converting them into joint-stock companies
- 1992 - Creation of the IPS Project, an automated information-retrieval system for optimal transport and technological solutions
- 2004 – New owners, with shareholders appointing new management
- 2006 – Establishment of the Spetstyazhavtotrans corporate group
- 2006 – Establishment of Polynom to design oil and gas facilities
- 2007 – Establishment of EDO "Spetstyazhproekt"
- 2008 – Establishment of NefteGazEnergoStroy Engineering (NGES Engineering)
- 2012 - Polynom won the ninth all-Russian competition for the best design and survey organization

=== Events ===
The 1970s were years of construction in the USSR, with the building of industrial and energy complexes in the Soviet Union began: Atommash, Kureiskaya, Sayano-Shushenskaya, Sakhalin and other HPP, NPP, oil and gas pipelines in Western Siberia and the first petrochemical plants. Each required the transport of heavy cargo which could not be delivered in parts.

For its study in 1974, the State Committee of the Council of Ministers of the USSR created a temporary scientific and technical committee to prepare proposals for transporting oversized cargoes of a large mass (OCLM). Its proposals were reflected in the State Committee resolutions "On ensuring the transportation of large-sized and heavy energy and other industrial equipment and the development of related research and development work" and "Guidelines for the research and design work to ensure the transportation of the energy and other industrial equipment", dated 24 November 1976. These documents outlined the main problems of research and development work and measures to satisfy the needs of the national economy for equipment transportation, including the search for new technical and logistical solutions. In May 1976, a Spetstyazhavtotrans convoy was established in Gorky.

On 6 April 1978 Resolution 262 of the Council of Ministers of the USSR, "On measures to improve the organization of transportation of large-sized and heavy cargoes", was made. Among the series of measures, the establishment of the specialized research and production association (SRPA) Spetstyazhavtotrans was mandated.

By the early 1990s Spetstyazhavtotrans was a research and production group accounting, according to some estimates, for over 60 percent of oversize transport in the country. It consisted of five large trucking companies in Novgorod, Leningrad, Moscow and Astrakhan, with branches in other cities. Bases were established in Siberia, where there was a great need for transport, in cities which included Surgut, Noyabrsk and Nizhnevartovsk.

The Spetstyazhavtotrans SRPA created a unified system for transporting oversize cargo and engineering services. Significant contributions were made by A. M. Lyovushkin, L. Y. Byzer, V. S. Molyarchuk, V. N. Androsyuk, A. G. Alexandrov, A. S. Diamidov, N. A. Troitskaya, V. A. Alexandrov, V. P. Safronov, L. M. Moshek, A. A. Lvov, A. Ya. Kogan, P. A. Shpolyansky, R. A. Atanasyan and many others.

Spetstyazhproekt was re-created, and in 2008 NefteGazEnergoStroy Engineering (NGES Engineering LLC) was added to the corporate group which included Polynom LLC. A new production and scientific structure, providing engineering support for transportation and facility design for the chemical and petrochemical industries, was forming.

== Notable transports ==
- 1977 – Reactor vessel and steam generators for the VVEP-1000 power-generating unit from Izhorsk Engineering Plant to Novovoronezh NPP
- 1978 – Two gas turbines for polyethylene production, more than 18.2 m in length with a diameter of 4.5 to 7.6 m and weighing 210 tons each, from John Brown & Company to the Prikumsky plastics factory (now Stavrolen) in Budennovsk
- 1979 - Turbo generator stator weighing 490 tons from Electrosila to the Kostroma Power Station
- 1979 – Nine pieces of equipment for methanol production, with a maximum diameter of 6 m, length of 33 m and weight of 220 tons, to the Gubahinsky chemical plant
- 1981 – Hydrometeorological equipment, 26.5 m long, 6.5 m wide, 7.3 m high and weighing 110 tons, to the Kyrgyz hydrometeorology office
- 1980s – Nine distillation columns, with diameters up to 5.5 m, lengths over 90 m, weighing up to 700 tons, from Petrozavodsk and Dzerzhinsk to Tobolsk
- 1980s - Steam generator weighing 340 tons to the Zaporizhzhia Nuclear Power Plant
- 1982 – Concrete floating workshop 67.5 m long, 13.52 m wide and weighing 1300 tons from Bourgas, Bulgaria to Havana
- 1983 - Distillation column, weighing 335.2 tons with a diameter of 5 m and 62 m long, from the Dzerzhinskhimmash plant in Kirishi
- 1986 – Four ammonia-production units, up to 4 m in diameter and weighing up to 500 tons, from Bulgaria to a chemical plant in Dimitrovgrad
- 1987 - TVR-120-2 generator stator and TDTS=125000/1100 transformer weighing 126 and 114 tons, respectively, to Yuzhno-Sakhalinsk
- 2007 – Equipment for the Nizhnekamskneftekhim polyethylene plant (320 packages, totaling more than 685 tons)
- 2008 – Two reactors (R-1201 – about 30 m long and 115 tons, and R-1202 – over 38 m and 310 tons) to the site of the Nizhnekamskneftekhim polyolefin plant
- 2009 – Two 800-ton reactors from Izhorskiye Zavody to Lukoil-NORSI
- 2012 – Petrochemical equipment (weighing up to 380 tons, 67 m long and up to 7.5 m in diameter) from Energomash-Atommash in Volgodonsk to TANECO in Nizhnekamsk
- 2010-2013 – Turbine wheels and heavy equipment to the RusHydro Sayano-Shushenskaya hydro power plant
- 2011-2014 – Six reactors, weighing up to 1,300 tons, to the Rosneft Tuapse oil terminal
- 2013-2014 – Four hydrofracking reactors, weighing up to 1,306 tons, to the Rosneft Achinsk refinery

== Record ==
In 2013, Spetstyazhavtotrans set a world record for road transportation of heavy cargo (a hydrocracking reactor) 203 kilometers from Kubekovo in Krasnoyarsk Krai to the Achinsk refinery
