= Mikhail Manevich =

Russian economist (1961–1997)

Mikhail Manevich (Russian: Михаил Владиславович Маневич, 18 February 1961 in Leningrad, Soviet Union – 18 August 1997 in Saint Petersburg, Russia) was a Russian economist and official of the Saint Petersburg City Administration.

== Life ==
Manevich graduated from Leningrad Institute of Finance and Economics in 1983 and worked with the institute as a research fellow during the 1980s. In 1992 in the wake of Russian privatization he was appointed Deputy Chairman of the Committee for City Property Management of Saint Petersburg and in 1993 was promoted to the position of its First Deputy Chairman. As the Chairman of the Committee, Sergey Belyaev, assumed the position of the Director of the Federal Bankruptcy Agency in Moscow in 1993, Manevich became acting Chairman. In March 1994 he was approved as the Chairman. In 1996, as Vladimir Yakovlev had been elected governor instead of Anatoly Sobchak, Manevich also became Vice Governor of Saint Petersburg for City Property Management. He has been involved in the development of privatisation legislation and state privatisation programmes, and housing and communal reform at the federal level.

== Death ==
Mikhail Manevich was wounded by a sniper on his way to office in the morning of 18 August 1997, while his car drove out from Rubinstein Street to Nevsky Prospekt in Saint Petersburg, and died in hospital shortly thereafter. Officially the assassination has not been solved, though Anatoly Chubais, a close friend of Manevich, claimed in 2006 that the people behind the assassination were serving their life terms. He apparently hinted at Yury Shutov.

Preceded by Sergey Belyaev	Chairman of the Committee for City Property Management of Saint Petersburg City Administration; 1993–1997	Succeeded by German Gref
Preceded by N/A	Vice Governor of Saint Petersburg for City Property Management; 1996–1997	Succeeded by German Gref
