= Saint Petersburg City Administration =

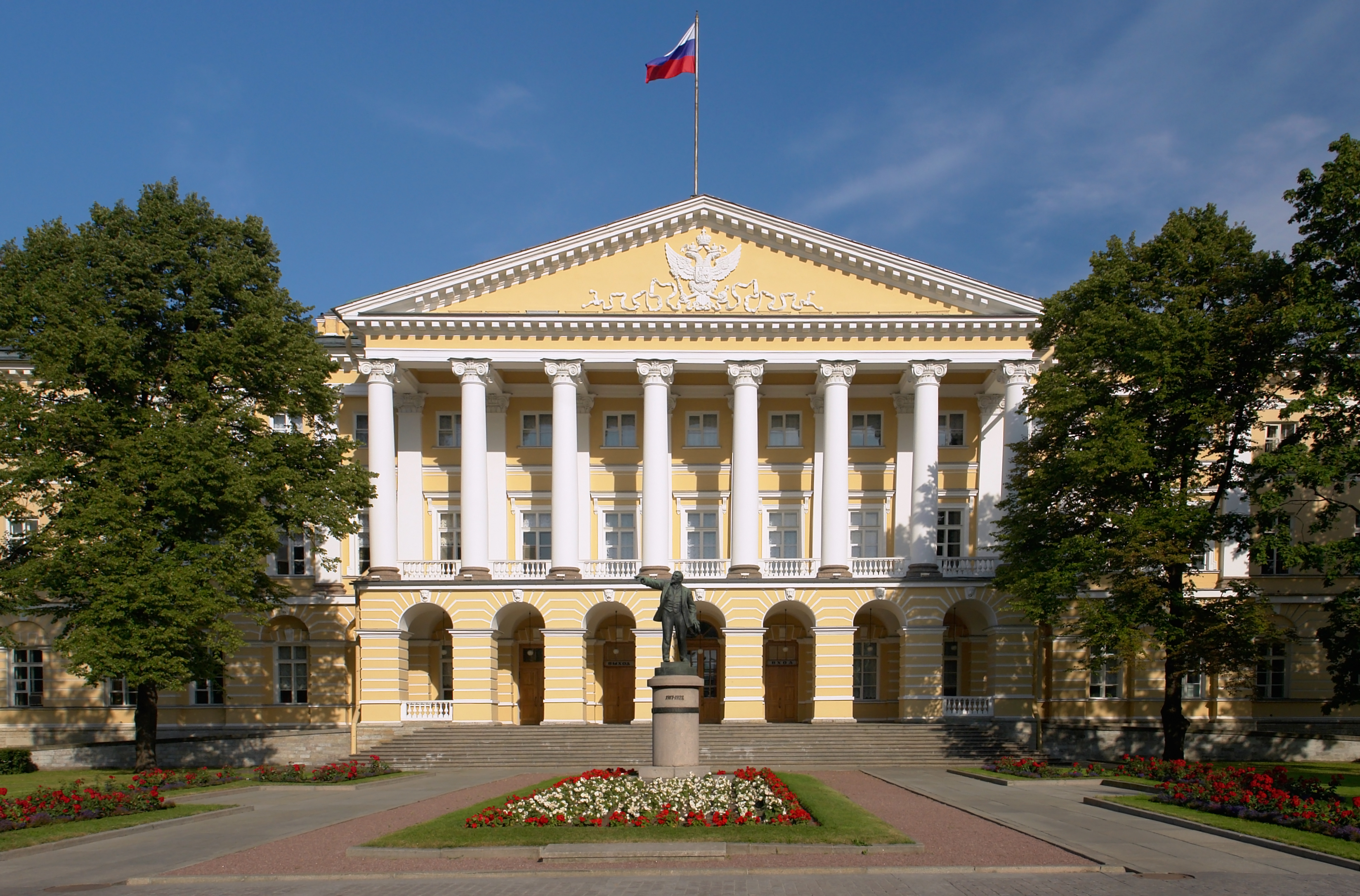
Smolny, where the City Administration seats

Saint Petersburg City Administration (Администрация Санкт-Петербурга) is the superior executive body of Saint Petersburg (formerly Leningrad), Russian Federation. It is located in a historic building, Smolny and known as the Government of Saint Petersburg (Правительство Санкт-Петербурга).

The head of the administration is the Governor of Saint Petersburg (Mayor of Saint Petersburg before 1996). In 1991 – 2006 the head of the city was elected by direct vote of the city residents. However, according to a Russian Federal Law accepted in 2004 (Full text in Russian: ), the governor was proposed by the President of the Russian Federation and approved (or disapproved) by the City Legislative Assembly until 2014, while in 2014 the governor was elected by popular vote of the city residents.

== List of the heads of Leningrad / Saint Petersburg City Administration since 1991 ==
- Anatoly Sobchak (Mayor, 1991 – 1996, elected in 1991, lost the elections in 1996)
- Vladimir Yakovlev (Governor, 1996 – 2003, elected in 1996 and 2000, resigned in 2003 a year before the second term expiration, First deputy Mayor in 1994 – 1996)
- Alexander Beglov (acting Governor in June – October 2003)
- Valentina Matviyenko (Governor, elected in 2003, proposed by the president and approved by the Legislative Assembly in 2006, resigned in 2011)
- Georgy Poltavchenko (proposed by the president and approved by the Legislative Assembly in August 2011)

See also List of heads of Saint Petersburg government.

== Structure ==
The Administration consists of the Governor, the Government, The Governor's Chancellery, the city committees and the executive bodies of the districts subordinate to it.

=== Committees ===
- Committee for City Improvement and Roads
- Committee for External Relations and Tourism (heads: Vladimir Putin (June 28, 1991 – June 1996), Gennadiy Tkachyov (June 1996 – May 28, 2002), Alexander Prokhorenko (since June 2002))
- Committee for Housing Policy
- Committee for the Press and Mass Media Cooperation (heads: Dmitry Mezentsev (1991 – 1996), Alexander Potekhin (October 1997 – 2001), Irina Potekhina (2001 – October 2003), Alla Manilova (since October 17, 2003))
- Committee for Science and Higher Education
- Committee for Public Health
- Committee for Transport
- Committee for Labor and Social Security
- Committee for Economic Development, Industrial Policy and Trade (in March 1993 merged with the Committee for Finances into Committee for Economy and Finances headed by Alexei Kudrin, in July 1996 separated again, heads: Dmitri Sergeyev (1992 – March 1993, July 1996 – 1997), Ilya Klebanov (December 1997 – May 31, 1999), Anatoly Aleksashin (June 21, 1999 – July 2001), Sergey Vetlugin (July 2001 – October 2003), Vladimir Blank (October 2003 – June 2006), Aleksei Sergeyev (since June 27, 2006))
- Committee for Energetic and Engineering Support
- Committee for State Control, Utilization and Protection of Historical and Cultural Landmarks
- Committee for City Planning and Architecture (heads: Oleg Kharchenko (1991 – June 15, 2004), Aleksandr Viktorov (since June 15, 2004))
- Committee for Youth policy and Social organizations Interaction
- Committee for Construction (heads: Viktor Loktionov (until May 26, 2000), Alexander Vakhmistrov (May 26, 2000 – November 2003), Yevgeny Yatsishin (November 2003 – February 2, 2005), Roman Filimonov (since February 2, 2005))
- Committee for Education
- Committee for Culture
- Committee for City Property Management (formed on September 10, 1991, heads: Alexander Utevsky (October 1990 – December 12, 1991), Sergey Belyaev (December 12, 1991 – October 22, 1993), Mikhail Manevich (October 23, 1993 – August 18, 1997, murdered by a sniper), German Gref (August 18, 1997 – August 13, 1998), Andrey Likhachyov (August 14, 1998 – October 4, 1999), Valery Nazarov (October 11, 1999 – November 10, 2003), Igor Mikhaylovich (since November 11, 2003))
- Committee for Physical Culture and Sports (head: Yuri Avdeyev)
- Committee for Finances (in March 1993 merged with the Committee for Economic Development into Committee for Economy and Finances headed by Alexei Kudrin, in July 1996 separated again, heads: Alexei Kudrin (1992 – March 1993), Igor Artemyev (July 1996 – January 1999), Viktor Krotov (January 1999 – November 2003), Alexander Nikonov (since November 24, 2003))
- State Technical Administrative Inspection
- State Housing Inspection
- Committee for Justice, Legal Order, and Safety
- Committee for Land Resources and Land Development
- Committee for Investments and Strategic Projects (founded in 2003, heads: Andrey Mikhaylenko (December 9, 2003 – June 2004), Maxim Sokolov (since June 29, 2004))
- Informatization and Communication Committee
- Committee for Use of Natural Resources, Environment Protection, and Environmental Safety
- Saint Petersburg Licensing Chamber
- Saint Petersburg Regional Power Commission
- Veterinary Department
- Saint Petersburg State Construction Supervision and Expertise Department
- Civil Registration Department
- Saint Petersburg Flood Control Facilities Construction Department
- Committee for Executive powers of the government development and Interaction with the local autonomous bodies
- Committee on transport-transit policy
- Appeals and Complaints Department
- Hotels services Department of the Administration of St.Petersburg
- Information Department – Press-service of the Governor's Administration of St.Petersburg
- Committee on Financial control of St.Petersburg
- St.Petersburg and Leningrad Region Archival Committee
- Gardening and Market-gardening Development Department
- St.Petersburg and Leningrad region Central Administrative Board of Internal Affairs

=== Saint Petersburg District Administrations ===
- Admiralteysky District Administration
- Vasileostrovsky District Administration
- Vyborgsky District Administration
- Kalininsky District Administration
- Kirovsky District Administration
- Kolpinsky District Administration
- Krasnogvardeysky Administration
- Krasnoselsky District Administration (Head: Evgeny Nikolskiy)
- Kronshtadtsky District Administration
- Kurortny District Administration
- Moskovsky District Administration
- Nevsky District Administration
- Petrogradsky District Administration
- Petrodvortsovy District Administration
- Primorsky District Administration
- Pushkinsky District Administration
- Frunzunsky District Administration
- Tsentralny District Administration

=== Government ===
The Government of Saint Petersburg is headed by the governor and includes also vice-governors, the head of the Committee for City Improvement and Roads, the head of the Committee for Press and Mass Media Cooperation, the head of the Committee for Economic Development, Industrial Policy and Trade, the envoy of the governor to the Saint Petersburg Legislative Assembly, the head of the Tsentralny District Administration and the Chief of the Main Directorate for Internal Affairs of Saint Petersburg and Leningrad Oblast.

=== Vice-Governors ===
- Igor Divinsky (Vice-Governor; State administrative and technical inspections; Head of Gostekhnadzor – State inspection of St. Petersburg to oversee the technical state of self-propelled vehicles and other equipment)
- Alexander Govorunov (Vice-Governor; Head of The Governor's Chancellery)
- Olga Kazanskaya (for Health)
- Igor Albin (for Construction, Transportation and Ecology)
- Vladimir Kirillov (for Science, Culture and Education)
- Nikolai Bondarenko (for Housing policy)
- Oleg Markov (for Tourism, Communications and External Relations)
- Sergei Movchan (for Industry, support small business and Innovations)
- Mikhail Mokretsov (for Economy, Investment and Federal and City Property Management)
- Mikhail Brodsky (Governor's representative in the Legislative Assembly)

Former Vice-Governors:

- Anatoly Kagan (for Public Health)
- Oleg Virolaynen (2003 – 2006, for City Improvement)
- Anna Markova (2002 – 2003, for Justice)
- Alexander Potekhin (1997 – 2001, for Mass Media and Public Relations)
- Irina Potekhina (2001 – 2003, for Mass Media and Public Relations)
- Valeri Malyshev (2001 – 2003, for City Improvement)
- Konstantin Kondakov (2002 – 2003, for City Improvement)
- Gennady Tkachyov (1996 – 2002)
- Alexander Prokhorenko (2002 – 2003, for External Relations)
- Sergey Vetlugin (2001 – 2003, for Economy)
- Mikhail Manevich (1996 – 1997, for City Property Management)
- Vladimir Derbin (2000 – 2003, for Welfare)
- Alexander Beglov (first Vice-Governor, 2002–2003)
- Vladimir Petrovich Yakovlev (1993 – 2000, for Culture)
- Yury Antonov (1998 – 2002, for Energy)
- Vladimir Shitarev (2000 – 2003, for Culture)
- Igor Artemyev (1996 – 1999, First Vice-Governor)
- Dmitry Kozak (1998 – 1999)
- Viktor Loktionov (1996 – 2000, for Construction)
- Andrey Likhachyov (1998 – 1999, for City Property Management)
- Andrey Chernenko (2003 – 2004, for Justice)
- Vladimir Grishanov (1998 – 2003, Chief of Staff)
- Vyacheslav Shcherbakov (until 2000, for Welfare)
- Viktor Krotov (for Finances)
- Ilya Klebanov
- German Gref (1997 – 1998, for City Property Management)
- Viktor Lobko (until 2014, Chief of Staff of the Governor)
- Mikhail Oseevsky (until 2012, for Economy)
- Lyudmila Kostkina (for Welfare, until 2014)
- Sergey Tarasov (for Science, Culture and Education)
- Alexander Vakhmistrov (for construction)
- Valery Tikhonov (for Justice, Communications and External Relations)
- Yury Molchanov (for Investment and Federal and City Property Management)
- Alexander Polukeyev (for City Improvement, since 2006)
