= Legislative Assembly of Saint Petersburg =

Regional parliament of Saint Petersburg, Russia

Legislative Assembly of Saint Petersburg Законодательное собрание Санкт-Петербурга
- 8th legislature

Type
- Type: Unicameral

History
- Preceded by: Lensovet

Leadership
- Chairman: Aleksandr Belsky, United Russia since 19 September 2021

Structure
- Seats: 50
- Political groups: United Russia (37); LDPR (4); New People (4); The Greens (3); Communist Party (2)

Elections
- Voting system: Mixed
- Last election: 18—20 September 2026
- Next election: 2031

Meeting place
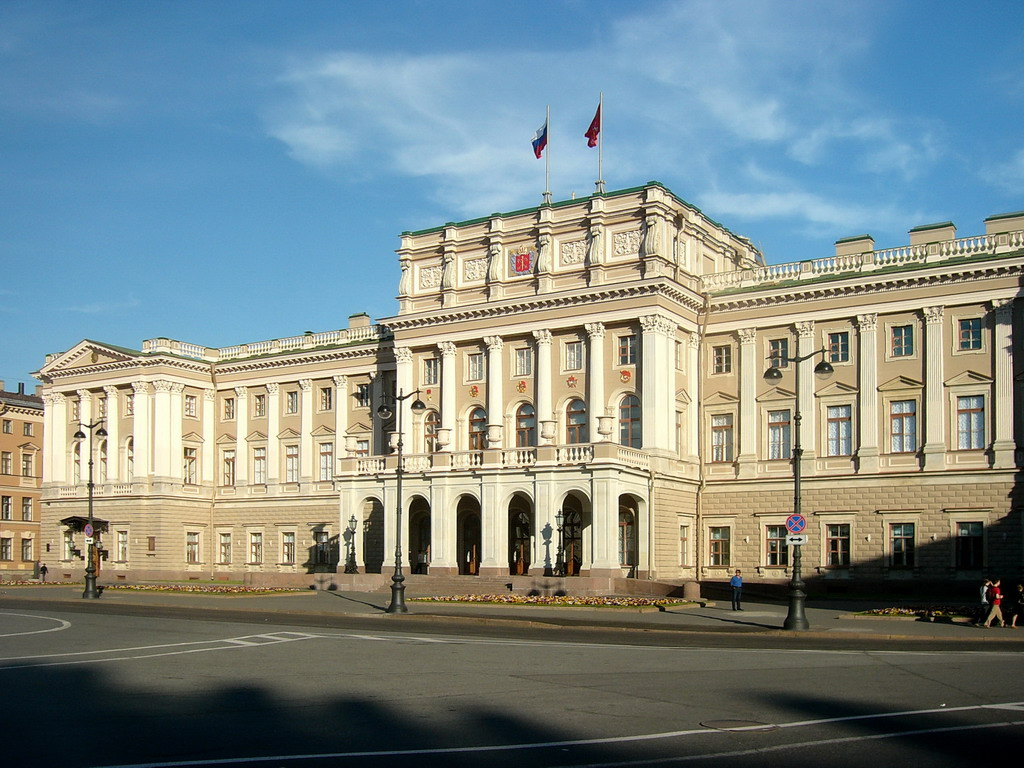
- Legislative Assembly Building; Saint Petersburg, St. Isaac Square 6, Mariinsky Palace

Website
- www.assembly.spb.ru

The Legislative Assembly of Saint Petersburg (Russian: Законода́тельное собра́ние Санкт-Петербу́рга, ЗакС, romanized: Zakonodátel'noe sobránie Sankt-Peterbúrga, ZakS) is the regional parliament of Saint Petersburg, a federal subject (federal city) of Russia. It was established in 1994, succeeding the Leningrad Council of People's Deputies (Lensovet).

It is a permanent body, and the supreme and only governing body in St Petersburg. It is located in the Mariinsky Palace. Its powers and duties are defined in the Charter of Saint Petersburg.

== History ==
=== Russian Empire ===
Saint Petersburg's city duma was established in 1786 as part of Catherine II's reforms on local government.

In 1798, Paul I abolished the city duma and replaced it with the Ratusha (Rathaus) until the city duma was restored in 1802. The city duma was again abolished in 1918 with its functions devolved to the Petrograd Soviet.

=== Russian Federation ===
Initially it was the speaker of the Assembly who served as member of the Federation Council of Russia representing the legislative power body of this federal subject. However, in 2000 the federal legislation changed and the duties were delegated to a separate person to be elected by the regional legislature (not necessarily among its members). From June 13, 2001 until May 18, 2011, Sergey Mironov occupied this position.

According to federal legislation from 2005, the governor of Saint Petersburg (as well as heads of other federal subjects of Russia) was proposed by the President of Russia and approved by the regional legislature. On December 20, 2006, incumbent Valentina Matviyenko was approved as governor. In 2012, following the passage of a new federal law, which restored direct elections of the heads of federal subjects, the city charter was again amended.

=== Convocations ===
The first three convocations were formed by a single-member district plurality voting system with at least 20% participation required (except for the 1994 elections with their changing participation threshold), two-round for the first and second convocations and single-round for the third one. On March 11, 2007, the fourth elections were held using a party-list proportional representation system with a 7-percent election threshold and no required threshold of participation for the first time according to the new city law accepted by the third convocation of the assembly in 2006 and new federal legislation.

- 1st convocation: March 20–21/October 30/November 20, 1994
- 2nd convocation: December 6/December 20, 1998
- 3rd convocation: December 8, 2002
- 4th convocation: March 11, 2007
- 5th convocation: December 4, 2011
- 6th convocation: September 18, 2016
- 7th convocation: September 17–19, 2021
- 8th convocation: September 18–20, 2026

== Composition ==
The Assembly is a permanent body, and the supreme and only governing body in Saint Petersburg. It consists of fifty seats and is elected for a five-year term. Half of this number run in single-mandate constituencies, while the other half are in a single electoral district, with winners elected in proportion to the number of votes cast. The candidates are nominated by electoral associations.

=== 2026 ===
Party	%	Seats
United Russia	54.66	37
New People	12.35	4
Liberal Democratic Party	12.15	4
Communist Party	10.5	2
The Greens	6.10	3
A Just Russia	2.65	0
Registered voters/turnout	55.20	

=== Structure and governor ===
The highest executive body of state power in Saint Petersburg is the government of Saint Petersburg, headed by the Governor of Saint Petersburg, who is the region's highest-ranking official. The Governor is elected for five years by Russian citizens who live in Saint Petersburg permanently.

As of 2025, the incumbent governor is Alexander Beglov, who was re-elected for a second term of office in 2024.

== Past compositions ==
=== 2007 ===
Party	%	Seats
United Russia	37.37	23
A Just Russia	21.90	13
Communist Party	16.02	9
Liberal Democratic Party	10.88	5
Patriots of Russia	5.60	0
Union of Right Forces	5.17	0
Registered voters/turnout	33.18	

=== 2011 ===
Party	%	Seats
United Russia	36.96	20
A Just Russia	23.08	12
Communist Party	13.69	7
Yabloko	12.50	6
Liberal Democratic Party	10.17	5
Patriots of Russia	1.19	0
Union of Right Forces	0.82	0
Registered voters/turnout	54.27	

=== 2016 ===
Party	%	Seats
United Russia	41.25	36
Liberal Democratic Party	12.40	3
Communist Party	11.26	3
Party of Growth	10.72	3
Yabloko	9.77	2
A Just Russia	9.10	3
People's Freedom Party	2.11	0
Labor Front	0.78	0
Registered voters/turnout	32.41	

=== 2021 ===
Party	%	Seats
United Russia	33.29	30 (Note: Including one independent candidate supported by United Russia)
Communist Party	17.47	7
A Just Russia — For Truth	12.71	5
New People	10.03	3
Yabloko	9.15	2
Liberal Democratic Party	7.90	3
Party of Growth	4.13	0
Party for Freedom and Justice	2.43	0
Registered voters/turnout	35.52	

Controversy

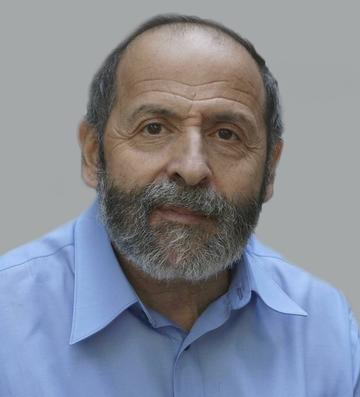
Boris Vishnevsky in 2020. He was an MP of the Legislative Assembly of Saint Petersburg at the time of the election.

While non-systemic opposition was largely eliminated from the elections, those candidates (mostly of systemic opposition) who were allowed to participate were targeted by various semi-legal intimidation or confusion techniques. The one includes "doppelganger candidates", where a person of similar look and surname was put on the same ballot in order to confuse voters. A remarkable case of Boris Vishnevskiy, a candidate of the Yabloko party, who run in the №2 Saint Petersburg circuit with two nearly indistinguishable doppelgängers alongside was widely reported. (Note: Both English and Russian speaking media have reported the incident long before election even started.) Both have changed their legal names to "Boris Vishnevsky" shortly before the elections, and returned to their original names shortly after it was finished.

== Speakers ==
	Name	Period	Notes
1st convocation	Yury Kravtsov	January 5, 1995 – April 2, 1998,	Dismissed ahead of schedule
1st convocation	Sergei Mironov	April 2, 1998 – 1999	Acting
2nd convocation	Viktor Novosyolov	1999	Acting, assassinated on October 20, 1999
2nd convocation	Sergei Tarasov	June 7, 2000 – January 15, 2003	
3rd convocation	Vadim Tyulpanov	January 15, 2003 – December 13, 2011	
4th convocation	Vadim Tyulpanov	January 15, 2003 – December 13, 2011	
5th convocation	Vyacheslav Makarov	December 14, 2011 – September 28, 2016	
6th convocation	Vyacheslav Makarov	September 28, 2016 – September 29, 2021	
7th convocation	Aleksandr Belsky	September 29, 2021 – present	
