= Maxim Reznik =

Russian politician

- Максим Резник
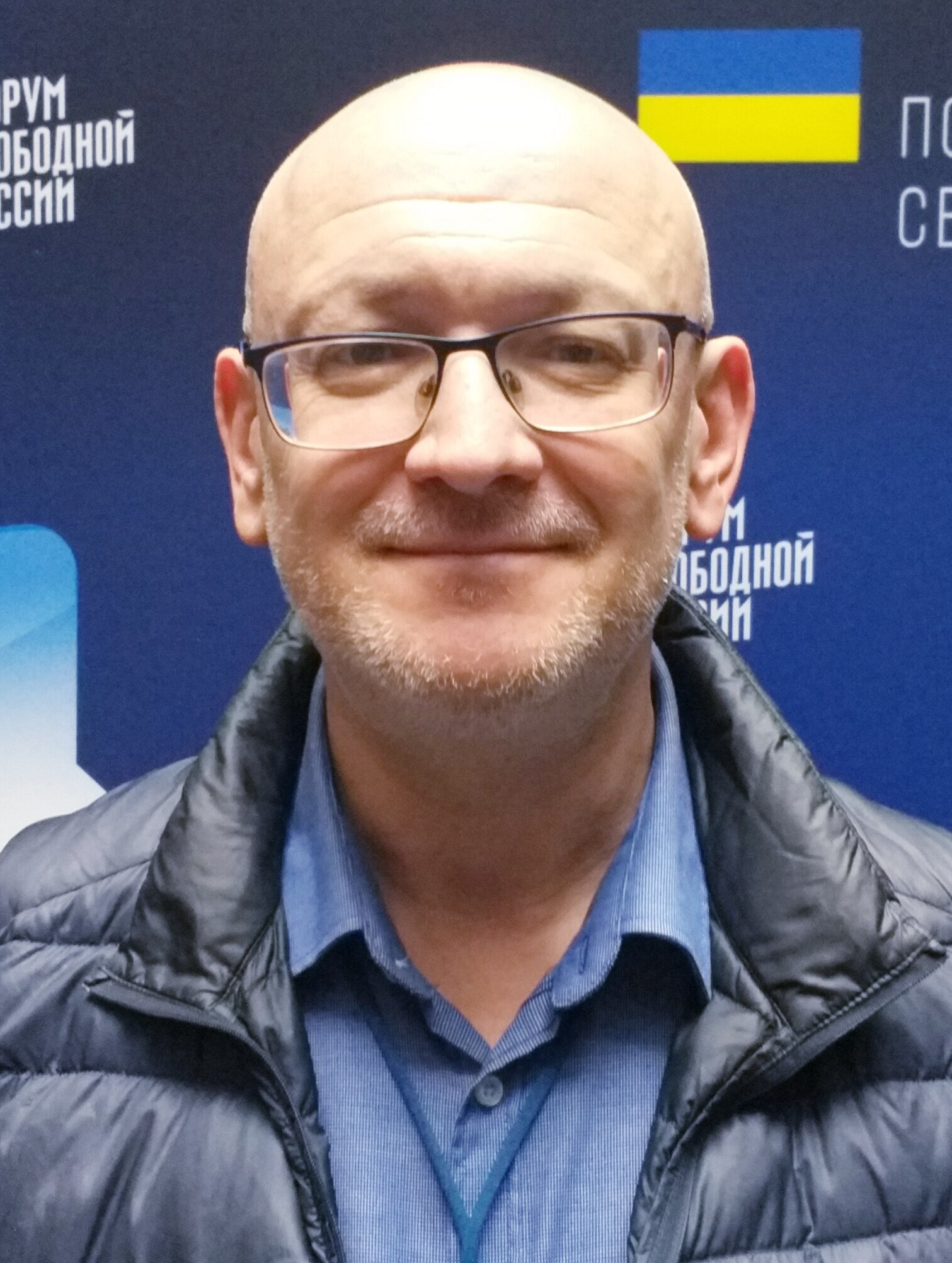
- Reznik in 2024

Deputy of the Legislative Assembly of Saint Petersburg 5th and 6th convocations
- In office December 4, 2011 – September 29, 2021

Deputy of the Council of Deputies Georgiyevsky Municipal Okrug No. 74 of Saint Petersburg
- In office 2000–2004

Deputy Chairman of the Committee for Family, Childhood and Youth Affairs of the Administration of Saint Petersburg
- In office 1997–1999

Personal details
- Born: September 13, 1974 (age 52) Leningrad, Soviet Union
- Party: Yabloko (1995—2012) Civic Platform (member of the Civic Committee of the Saint Petersburg branch of the party in 2013—2015) Party of Growth (since 2016)
- Education: Faculty of History of Saint Petersburg State University
- Awards: Badge of Honor "For Special Contribution to the Development of St. Petersburg"

Maxim Lvovich Reznik (Russian: Максим Львович Резник; born September 13, 1974) is a Russian politician. He sat as a deputy of the Legislative Assembly of Saint Petersburg's 5th and 6th convocations (2011–2021). He was previously chairman of the Saint Petersburg regional branch of the Yabloko party (2003–2012). He has been a participant of the Free Russia Forum since 2022.

== Biography ==
Maxim Lvovich Reznik was born on September 13, 1974, in Leningrad. He graduated from Leningrad Gymnasium No. 11. He graduated with honors from the Faculty of History of Saint Petersburg State University (1996), the North-West Academy of Public Administration (1997) with a degree in public and municipal administration.

Between 1997 and 1999, Reznik was Deputy Chairman of the Committee for Family, Childhood and Youth Affairs of the Administration of Saint Petersburg. He resigned after the Yabloko party decided to oppose Governor Vladimir Yakovlev. Between 1999 and 2003 he was Director of Social Programs of the EPITsentr-Saint Petersburg Foundation. He was also the founder and first chair of the Saint Petersburg Youth Union "Yabloko". In June 2000 he became a deputy of the Municipal Council of the 74th Municipal District of Saint Petersburg. Between 2000 and 2002 Reznik was Deputy chair, then between 2002 and 2003 First Deputy chairman, and then between 2003 and 2012 Chairman of the Saint Petersburg Regional Branch of Yabloko. (Sergey Indenok was the Reznik's assistant.)

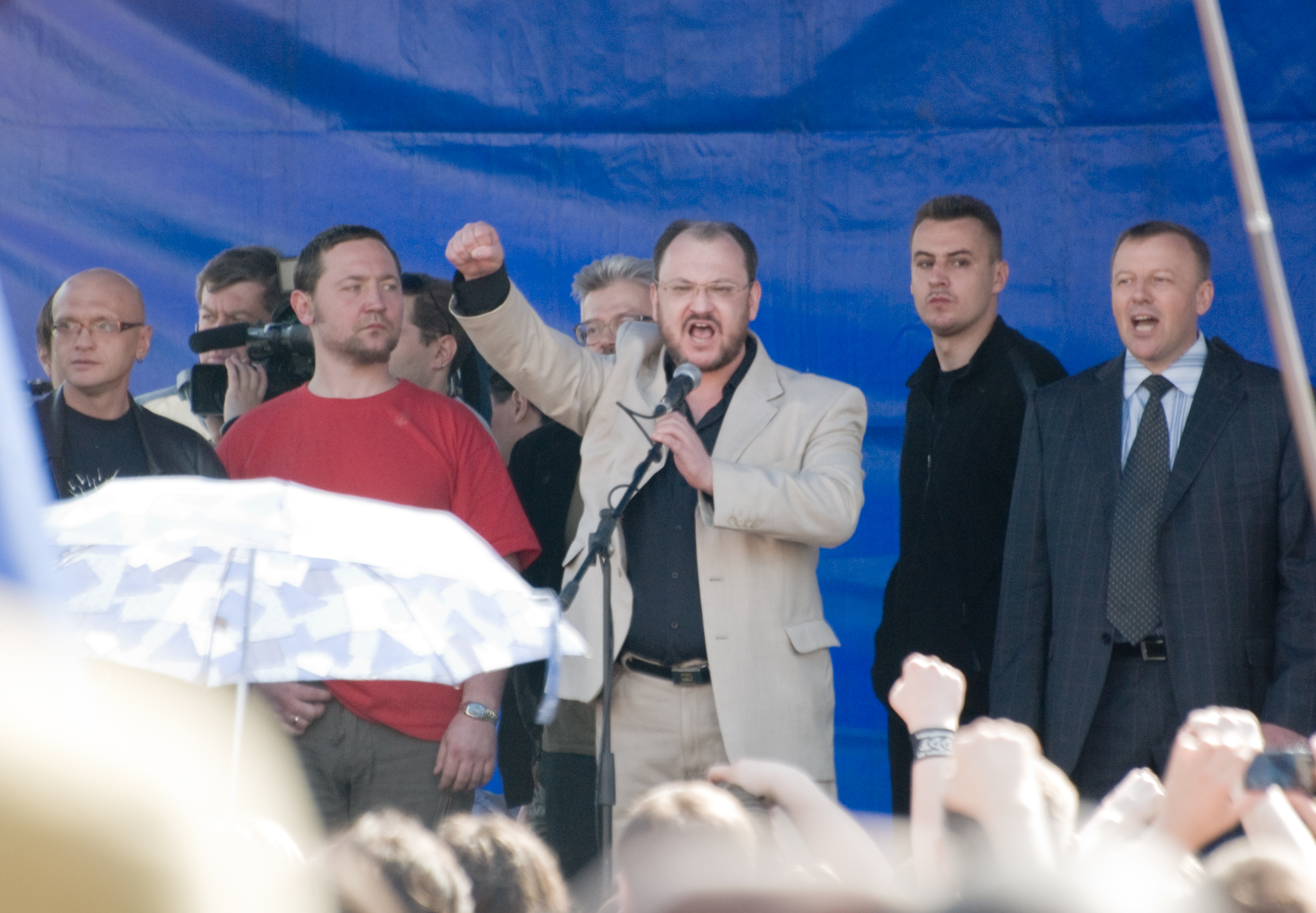
At the Dissenters' March 2008

On April 20, 2011, speaking at the Legislative Assembly of Saint Petersburg as the leader of the regional branch of a non-parliamentary party, Reznik criticised the A Just Russia party. Reznik accused the party of not being independent and oppositional, imitating political struggle, and also being controlled by the Kremlin.

On December 4, 2011, following the results of the elections to the Legislative Assembly of Saint Petersburg, Reznik was elected a deputy. On December 8, 2012, he was expelled from the Yabloko party. On September 18, 2016, he was re-elected as a deputy of the Legislative Assembly of Saint Petersburg on the list of the Party of Growth.

On May 1, 2019, Maxim Reznik was detained by police during a May Day procession along Nevsky Prospect at the head of a column carrying a banner "Petersburg against United Russia". He was released almost immediately. This led to critical coverage of Reznik from a number of media outlets.

Reznik worked as a history teacher in one of the private schools in Saint Petersburg. He is a Candidate for Master of Sports in chess. He is married to journalist Ksenia Kazarina.

=== Expulsion from Yabloko and further relations with the party ===
On March 17, 2012, by the decision of the Bureau, the activities of the governing bodies of the Saint Petersburg Yabloko, including the chairman of the organization, Maxim Reznik, were suspended. As his successors, he named his deputies: the executive director of the Bellona environmental center Nikolay Rybakov and the deputy of the municipal council of the Yekateringofsky district, Alexander Shurshev.

On May 25, 2012 a member of the Saint Petersburg branch of the party, Grigory Yavlinsky's assistant in the Legislative Assembly, Ksenia Vakhrusheva, publicly accused Maxim Reznik of supporting fraud in the vote count in the elections of deputies of the Legislative Assembly. Reznik filed a lawsuit for the protection of honor and dignity, but lost the case. The court denied his claim to declare Vakhrusheva's words untrue.

On December 8, 2012 he was expelled from the party (according to the Federal Bureau of the party, for actual consent to falsifications when counting votes in the elections of deputies of the Legislative Assembly of Saint Petersburg). He was accused of supporting close friends who received fake mandates: Olga Galkina and Vyacheslav Notyag. According to some observers, the falsifications could have been beneficial to United Russia. Maxim Reznik himself considers this a political reprisal. Supporters of the expelled associate this with the fact that Reznik was the leader of the intra-party opposition, and this was a continuation of the story with attempts to jointly expel him from the party along with Ilya Yashin.

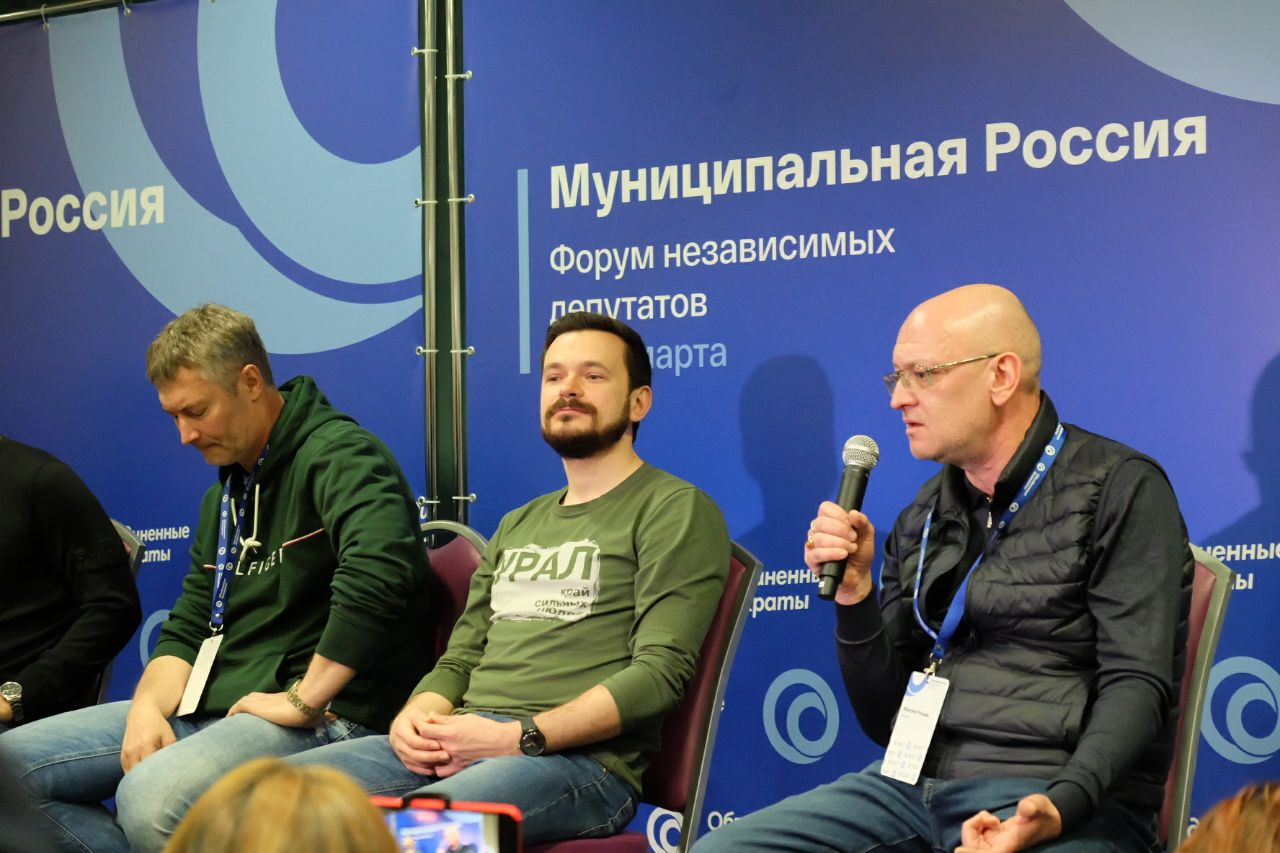
With Yevgeny Roizman and Ilya Yashin at the Forum of Independent Deputies "Municipal Russia", 2021

On March 23, 2021 Reznik defected to the Yabloko party group in the Legislative Assembly of Saint Petersburg, announcing his disagreements with the head of the Party of Growth faction Oksana Dmitrieva.

I moved, as they say, forever. I was just looking for a reason: our political paths diverged from the moment Dmitrieva supported Alexander Beglov, and I immediately said that he was not suitable for Saint Petersburg. The second point is that she supports the foreign policy of Vladimir Putin. And thirdly, the nomination of the Sukhodolsky candidates, who contribute to the victory of United Russia in the districts, the destruction of the policy that seems right to me – the joint struggle against United Russia ...

Later, a deputy from Yabloko Boris Vishnevskiy said that Yabloko was ready to nominate Reznik in the elections to the Legislative Assembly of Saint Petersburg. However, Yabloko ultimately did not nominate Reznik in 2021.

In September 2022 Reznik announced on his social networks that he had left the Russian Federation for an indefinite period. On September 1, 2023, the Russian Ministry of Justice added him to the list of individuals designated as "foreign agents".

== Projects ==
=== Noon Against Putin ===
Reznik became the author of the action "Noon Against Putin" – a peaceful protest action scheduled for March 17, 2024, in which citizens of Russia who do not support the policy of Vladimir Putin came to the polling stations en masse on the last day of the presidential election at 12 noon.

== Awards ==
- Badge of Honor "For Special Contribution to the Development of St. Petersburg" (2014).
- Petropol Award (2016).

== Criminal cases ==
On March 3, 2008 Reznik was detained on charges of insulting government officials and using violence against government officials. After spending 18 days in prison, on March 21 he was released on recognizance not to leave. Later, the criminal case was closed at the request of the police, in connection with the reconciliation of the parties. Many analysts considered him a political prisoner.

In 2021 a criminal case was opened against Reznik under Article 228 of the Criminal Code of the Russian Federation on charges of acquiring marijuana. On June 18, 2021 Reznik was placed under house arrest.
