= 2024 Saint Petersburg gubernatorial election =

Russian mayoral election

- 6–8 September 2024
- Turnout: 37.50%
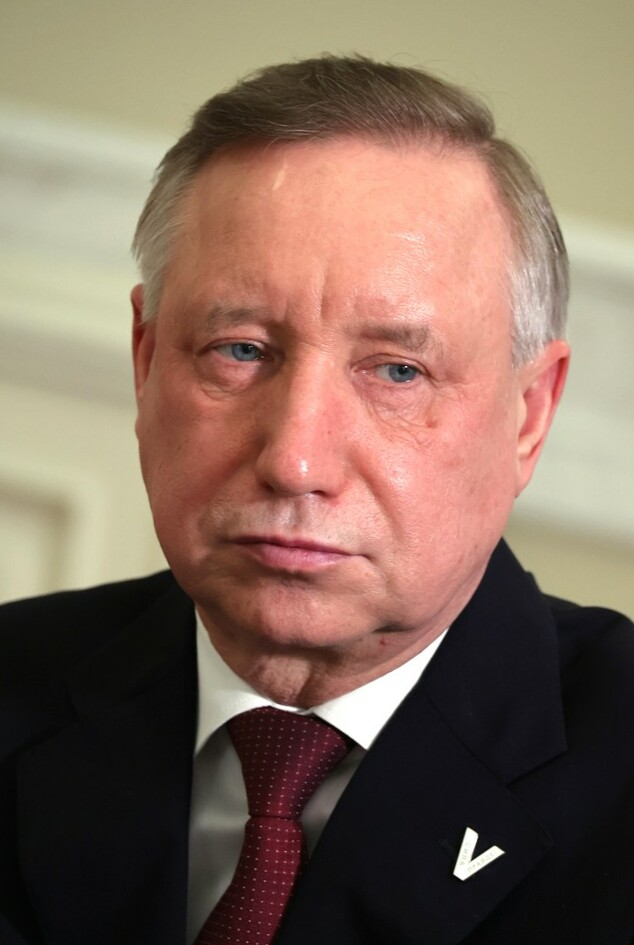
		LDPR
Candidate	Alexander Beglov	Maksim Yakovlev
Party	United Russia	LDPR
Popular vote	895,307	274,516
Percentage	59.80%	18.34%
	Greens	CPCR
Candidate	Pavel Bragin	Sergey Malinkovich
Party	The Greens	Communists of Russia
Popular vote	176,467	120,694
Percentage	11.79%	8.06%
- Results by municipalities
Governor before election
Alexander Beglov
Independent
Governor-elect
Alexander Beglov
United Russia

The 2024 Saint Petersburg gubernatorial election took place on 6–8 September 2024, on common election day. Incumbent Governor Alexander Beglov was re-elected to a second term in office.

== Background ==
Then-Presidential Plenipotentiary to the Northwestern Federal District Alexander Beglov was appointed acting Governor of Saint Petersburg in October 2018, replacing two-term incumbent Georgy Poltavchenko, who resigned at his own request. Beglov previously served as acting Governor of Saint Petersburg between June and October 2003 after Vladimir Yakovlev's resignation and prior to the election of Valentina Matviyenko in the second round of 2003 gubernatorial election. Poltavchenko meanwhile was appointed as chairman of the board of the United Shipbuilding Corporation, where he served until August 2023.

Beglov ran for a full term as an independent, despite prior affiliations to the United Russia party, and faced a potential highly competitive election due to his soaring unpopularity and the city's overall heightened oppositional sentiments. Several notable candidates were absent from the ballot as Legislative Assembly of Saint Petersburg members Oleg Kapitonov (LDPR) and Boris Vishnevskiy (Yabloko) failed to qualify, while State Duma member Vladimir Bortko (CPRF) unexpectedly withdrew on August 31. Beglov won the September 2019 election with 64.43% against two opponents, Legislative Assembly members Nadezhda Tikhonova of A Just Russia and Mikhail Amosov of Civic Platform, both of whom received around 16%.

Among the most notable events during Beglov's first term was his conflict with businessman and Wagner Group mercenary leader Yevgeny Prigozhin. In autumn 2022 Prigozhin claimed that he invested 2 billion rubles into Beglov's 2019 campaign, while the governor sabotaged Wagner's headquarters opening and awarded city contracts to his friends and cronies. Governor Beglov in return replied that the conflict with Prigozhin had been caused by the businessman's desire to control food catering, garbage disposal and subway construction in the city. The conflict wound down with Prigozhin's and his closest allies' demise in a plane crash in August 2023. Political experts claimed that Prigozhin's death virtually eliminated major opposition to Beglov and cleared his way to a second term in office.

In April 2024 during a meeting with President Vladimir Putin Governor Beglov announced his intention to run for a second term and received Putin's endorsement.

== Candidates ==
In Saint Petersburg candidates for Governor can be nominated by registered political parties or by self-nomination. Candidate for Governor of Saint Petersburg should be a Russian citizen and at least 30 years old. Candidates for Governor should not have a foreign citizenship or residence permit. Each candidate in order to be registered is required to collect at least 10% of signatures of members and heads of municipalities. In addition, self-nominated candidates should collect 2% of signatures of Saint Petersburg residents. Also gubernatorial candidates present 3 candidacies to the Federation Council and election winner later appoints one of the presented candidates.

=== Declared ===
Candidate name, political party		Occupation	Status	Ref.
Alexander Beglov; United Russia	Alexander Beglov	incumbent Governor of Saint Petersburg (2003, 2018–present)	Registered	
Pavel Bragin; The Greens		Member of Ulyanka Municipal Okrug Council (2019–present); Waste management executive	Registered	
Sergey Malinkovich; Communists of Russia		Member of Altai Krai Legislative Assembly (2021–present); Chairman of Communists of Russia party (2022–present); Perennial candidate 2024 presidential candidate	Registered	
Maksim Yakovlev; Liberal Democratic Party		Member of Legislative Assembly of Saint Petersburg (2011–present)	Registered	
Aleksandr Abdin; RPSS		Private clinic owner and chief doctor	Failed to qualify	
Aleksey Kovalyov; Independent		Humanitarian aid coordinator	Failed to qualify (Note: submitted falsified signatures)	
Maria Mikhaylova; Rodina		Businesswoman	Failed to qualify (Note: vocally withdrew after submitting insufficient number of signatures and endorsed Alexander Beglov)	
Sergey Artemov; PPD		Businessman; Community activist	Did not file	
Igor Bucherov; Independent		Member of Toksovo Council of Deputies (2019–present); Businessman	Did not file	
Iosif Dzhagaev; Independent		Businessman; 2023 Moscow mayoral candidate	Did not file	
Svetlana Ivanova; Party of Progress		Individual entrepreneur	Did not file	
Nikolay Kalinin; Independent		Pensioner	Did not file	
Roman Kononenko; Communist Party		Member of Legislative Assembly of Saint Petersburg (2021–present)	Did not file	
Maksim Konoplyanikov; Independent		Businessman	Did not file	
Sergey Kudryavtsev; Independent		Youth center human resources department head	Did not file	
Nikolay Kuznetsov; Independent		Businessman	Did not file	
Yury Novotortsev; Independent		Driver	Did not file	
Lilia Sudyina; Independent		Member of Ivanovsky Municipal Okrug Council (2022–present); Youth social rehabilitation center director	Did not file	
Lyudmila Vasilyeva; Independent		Pensioner; Anti-war activist	Did not file	
Aleksandr Vinogradov; Independent		Individual entrepreneur Consumer rights advocate	Did not file	
Vladislav Voronkov; Independent		Housing management association director	Did not file	
Boris Zverev; Independent		Member of Legislative Assembly of Saint Petersburg (2021–present)	Did not file	

=== Declined ===
- Mikhail Amosov, Member of Legislative Assembly of Saint Petersburg (1994–2007, 2016–present), 2003 gubernatorial candidate, 2019 Civic Platform gubernatorial candidate
- Sardana Avksentyeva (New People), Member of State Duma (2021–present)
- Vladimir Bortko (CPRF), former Member of State Duma (2011–2021), 2019 gubernatorial candidate
- Vyacheslav Borodenchik (CPRF), Member of Legislative Assembly of Saint Petersburg (2021–present)
- Vladislav Davankov (New People), Deputy Chairman of the State Duma (2021–present), 2023 Moscow mayoral candidate, 2024 presidential candidate
- Oksana Dmitriyeva (New People), Member of State Duma (1993–1998, 1999–2016, 2021–present), 2014 A Just Russia gubernatorial candidate
- Vadim Grishkov (CPRF), Member of Legislative Assembly of Leningrad Oblast (2021–present), 2020 Leningrad Oblast gubernatorial candidate
- Pavel Itkin (LDPR), Deputy Chairman of the Legislative Assembly of Saint Petersburg (2023–present), Member of the Legislative Assembly (2019–present)
- Olga Khodunova (CPRF), former Member of Legislative Assembly of Saint Petersburg (2016–2021)
- Sangadzhi Tarbaev (New People), Member of State Duma (2021–present), Chairman of the Duma Committee on Tourism and Tourist Infrastructure (2021–present)
- Nadezhda Tikhonova (SR–ZP), former Member of Legislative Assembly of Saint Petersburg (2016–2021), 2019 gubernatorial candidate
- Boris Vishnevskiy (Yabloko), Member of Legislative Assembly of Saint Petersburg (2011–present), 2019 gubernatorial candidate, foreign agent

=== Candidates for Federation Council ===
Gubernatorial candidate, political party	Candidates for Federation Council	Status
Alexander Beglov; United Russia	* Yelena Lozko, 2000 Wheelchair dancesport World Champion * Igor Maksimtsev, Rector of Saint Petersburg State University of Economics (2006–present) * Valentina Matviyenko, Chairwoman of the Federation Council (2011–present), incumbent Senator (2011–present)	Registered

== Results ==
Summary of the 6–8 September 2024 Saint Petersburg gubernatorial election results
Candidate	Party	Votes	%
Alexander Beglov (incumbent)	United Russia	895,307	59.80
Maksim Yakovlev	Liberal Democratic Party	274,516	18.34
Pavel Bragin	The Greens	176,467	11.79
Sergey Malinkovich	Communists of Russia	120,694	8.06
Valid votes		1,466,984	97.98
Blank ballots		30,185	2.02
Total		1,497,172	100.00
Turnout		1,497,172	37.50
Registered voters		3,992,070	100.00

Governor Beglov re-appointed incumbent Senator and Chairwoman of the Federation Council Valentina Matviyenko (United Russia) to the Federation Council.

== See also ==
- 2024 Russian regional elections
