= List of international presidential trips made by Igor Dodon =

This is a list of international trips made by Igor Dodon, the 5th President of Moldova (23 December 2016 – 24 December 2020).

During his term in office he made:

- One visit to Greece, Hungary, Italy, Japan, Kyrgyzstan, Tajikistan, United Arab Emirates, United States and Holy See.
- Two visits to Armenia, Azerbaijan, France, Iran, Israel and Turkmenistan.
- Three visits to Belarus, Belgium and Germany.
- Four visits to Turkey.
- Twenty-one visits to Russia.

== 2017 ==
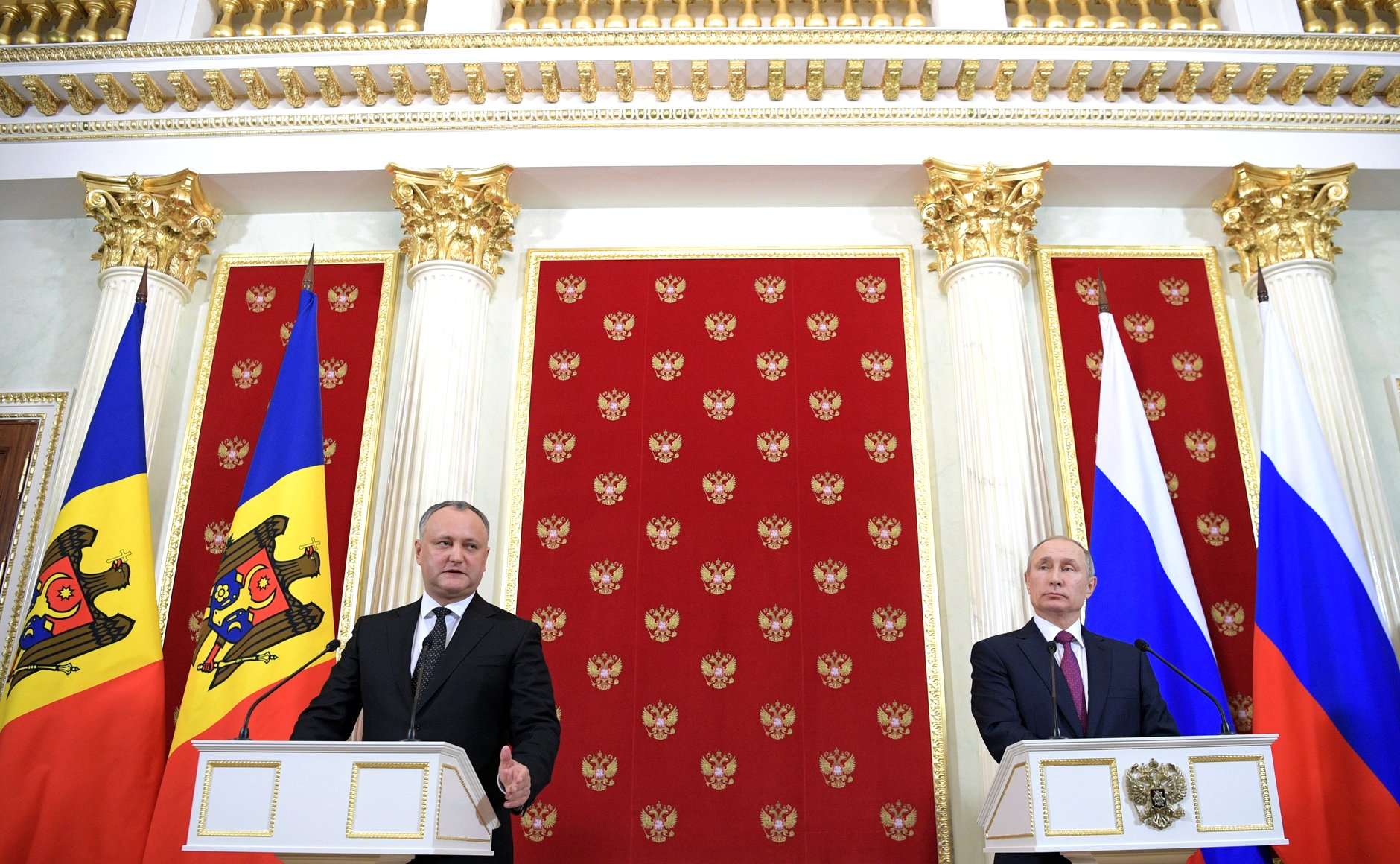
A joint press conference of Dodon with Russian president Vladimir Putin; January 2017.

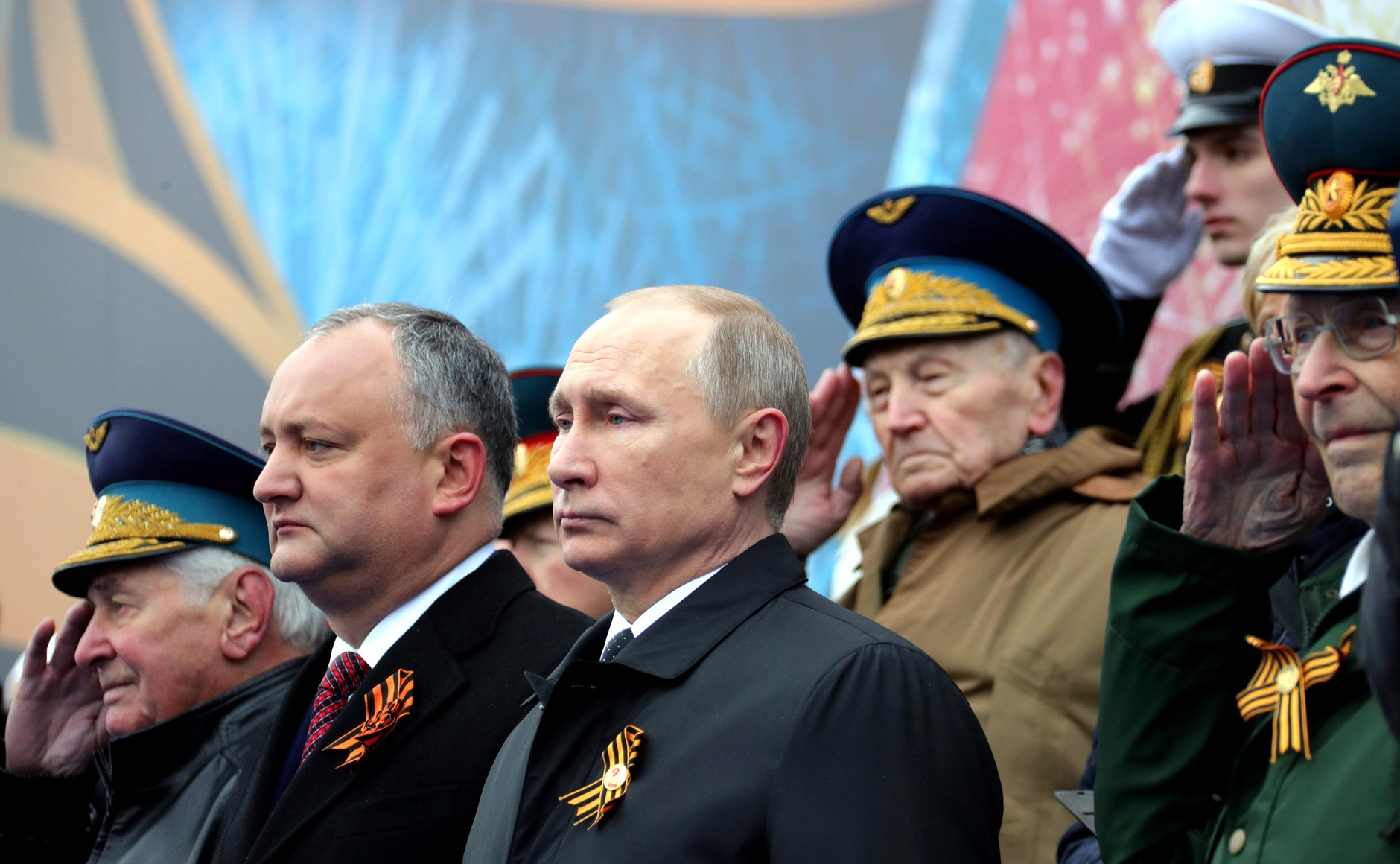
Dodon with Vladimir Putin during a Military Parade on Red Square in May 2017.

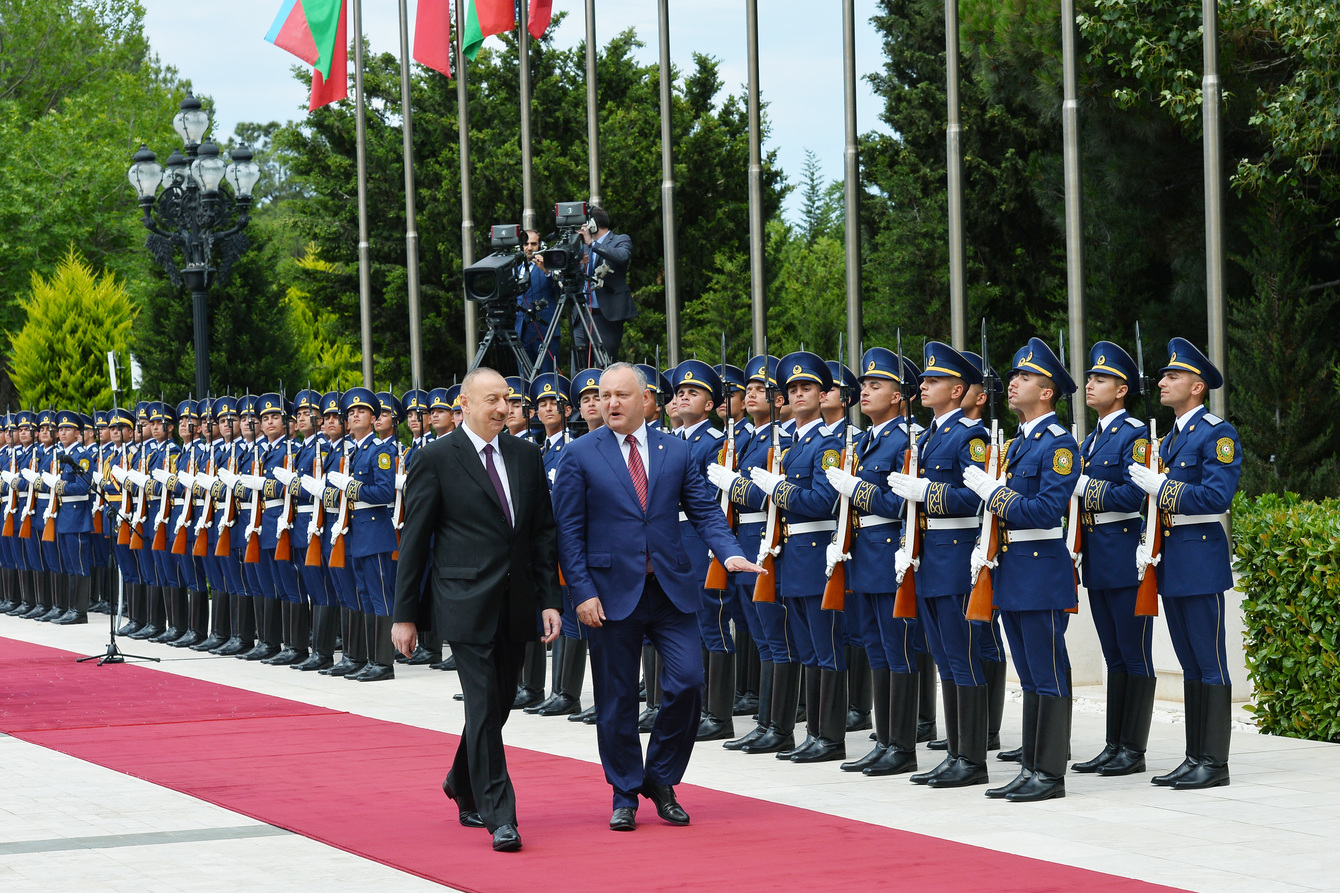
Official welcoming ceremony held for Dodon in Baku, June 2017.

#	Country	Location	Date	Details
1	Russia	Moscow	January 17	He paid an official visit to Moscow, Russia. It was the first official visit paid by a president of Moldova to Russia in 9 years. Met with: Vladimir Putin – President of Russia; Tigran Sargsyan – Chairman of the Board of the Eurasian Economic Commission
2	Belgium	Brussels	February 7	Met with: Donald Tusk – President of the European Council; Jean-Claude Juncker – President of the European Commission; Antonio Tajani – President of the European Parliament; Federica Mogherini – High Representative of the European Union for Foreign Affairs and Security Policy; Rose Gottenmoeller – Deputy Secretary General of NATO
3	Iran	Tehran	February 12	Attended the Women's World Chess Championship.: Hassan Rouhani – President of Iran
4	Russia	Moscow	March 17	Dodon participated in a business forum. Met with: Vladimir Putin – President of Russia; Patriarch Kirill of Moscow; Sergey Lebedev – Executive Secretary of Commonwealth of Independent States (CIS)
5	Kyrgyzstan	Bishkek	April 13–14	Participated in the meeting of the Supreme Eurasian Economic Council. Had bilateral meetings with: Almazbek Atambayev – President of Kyrgyzstan; Vladimir Putin – President of Russia; Alexander Lukashenko – President of Belarus; Serzh Sargsyan – President of Armenia; Nursultan Nazarbayev – President of Kazakhstan
6	Russia	Moscow	May 9	Participated in the 72nd anniversary of Victory Day. Met with: Vladimir Putin – President of Russia; Vyacheslav Volodin – Chairman of the State Duma
7	Turkey	Istanbul	May 21–22	Attended the 25th Summits of the Heads of State and Government of the Black Sea Economic Cooperation organization. Met with: Recep Tayyip Erdoğan – President of Turkey; Prokopis Pavlopoulos – President of Greece; Dmitry Medvedev – Prime Minister of Russia; Iliana Iotova – Vice President of Bulgaria
8	Hungary	Budapest	May 25	Working Visit Met with: János Áder – President of Hungary; Viktor Orbán – Prime Minister of Hungary; László Kövér – Speaker of the National Assembly
9	Russia	Saint Petersburg	June 1–3	Attended the St. Petersburg International Economic Forum. Met with: Vladimir Putin – President of Russia; Dmitry Rogozin – Deputy Prime Minister of Russia; Alexey Miller – CEO of Gazprom; Tigran Sargsyan – Chairman of the Board of the Eurasian Economic Commission
10	Azerbaijan	Baku	June 22–23	Met with: Ilham Aliyev – President of Azerbaijan; Artur Rasizade – Prime Minister of Azerbaijan; Ogtay Asadov – Speaker of the National Assembly
11	Belarus	Minsk, Vitebsk	July 12–16	Working Visit Met with: Alexander Lukashenko – President of Belarus
12	Iran	Tehran	August 5	Attended the Inauguration of Hassan Rouhani. Met with: Hassan Rouhani – President of Iran; Ali Larijani – Speaker of the Islamic Consultative Assembly; Mahmoud Hojjati – Minister of Agriculture; Dmitry Rogozin – Deputy Prime Minister of Russia; Federica Mogherini – High Representative of the European Union for Foreign Affairs and Security Policy
13	Turkmenistan	Ashgabat	September 13	Met with: Gurbanguly Berdimuhamedow – President of Turkmenistan; Valentina Matviyenko – Chairwoman of the Federation Council of Russia
14	Russia	Sochi	October 11	Attended the CIS summit. Had a bilateral meeting with: Vladimir Putin – President of Russia
15	Holy See	Vatican City	November 4	State Visit. Met with: Pope Francis
15	Italy	Rome	November 4	State Visit. Met with: Sergio Mattarella – President of Italy
16	Armenia	Yerevan	November 9–10	State Visit Met with: Serzh Sargsyan – President of Armenia; Karen Karapetyan – Prime Minister of Armenia; Ara Babloyan – President of the National Assembly
16	Russia	Moscow	November 12	Participated in the inauguration ceremony of Dimitrie Cantemir monument. Met with: Vyacheslav Volodin – Chairman of the State Duma; Andrey Vorobyov – Governor of Moscow Oblast
17	Russia	Moscow	December 26–27	Took part in the informal summit of Heads of State of the CIS. Met with: Vladimir Putin – President of Russia; Patriarch Kirill of Moscow; Alexey Miller – CEO of Gazprom

== 2018 ==
#	Country	Location	Date	Details
18	United Arab Emirates	Dubai	February 12–14	Working Visit. Participated in the World Government Summit. Met with: Mohammed bin Rashid Al Maktoum – Vice President of the UAE; Prime Minister of the UAE; Ruler of Dubai; Mohammed bin Zayed Al Nahyan – Crown Prince of Abu Dhabi
19	Germany	Berlin	March 1–3	State Visit.
20	Azerbaijan	Baku	March 15	Attended the 6th Global Baku Forum. Met with: Ilham Aliyev – President of Azerbaijan; Gjorge Ivanov – President of North Macedonia; Ilir Meta – President of Albania; Binali Yıldırım – Prime Minister of Turkey
21	Russia	Saint Petersburg	April 28	Working Visit. Met with the Moldovan diaspora in Saint Petersburg. Met with: Georgy Poltavchenko – Governor of Saint Petersburg
22	Russia	Sochi	May 14	Attended a summit of the Eurasian Economic Union. Met with: Vladimir Putin – President of Russia; Alexander Lukashenko – President of Belarus; Nikol Pashinyan – Prime Minister of Armenia
23	Russia	Saint Petersburg	May 23–27	Attended the St. Petersburg International Economic Forum as a guest. Dodon also visited the Valaam Monastery. Met with: Vyacheslav Volodin – Chairman of the State Duma; Alexey Miller – CEO of Gazprom; Alexander Mikhailov – Governor of Kursk Oblast
24	Russia	Moscow	June 14	Attended the 2018 FIFA World Cup Met with: Patriarch Kirill of Moscow
25	Turkey	Ankara	July 9	He attended the inauguration of Recep Tayyip Erdoğan.
26	Russia	Moscow	July 13–15	Attended the world cup closing ceremony. Met with: Vladimir Putin – President of Russia; Alexey Gordeyev – Deputy Prime Minister of Russia; Dmitry Kozak – Deputy Prime Minister of Russia
27	Greece	Mount Athos	August 13	Made a private pilgrimage to Mount Athos.
28	Russia	Moscow	September 25–26	Met with: Dmitry Kozak – Deputy Prime Minister of Russia
28	Tajikistan	Dushanbe	September 26–27	Working Visit Met with: Emomali Rahmon – President of Tajikistan; Vladimir Putin – President of Russia; Alexander Lukashenko – President of Belarus
29	Armenia	Yerevan	October 11–12	Attend the Francophonie summit and the celebrations in honor of the 2800th anniversary of the city of Yerevan. Met with: Armen Sarksyan – President of Armenia; Emmanuel Macron – President of France; Nikol Pashinyan – Prime Minister of Armenia
30	Turkey	Istanbul	October 29	Attended the opening of Istanbul Airport during the Turkish Republic's 95th anniversary celebrations.
30	Russia	Moscow	October 31	Official Visit. Visited Moscow State University. Met with: Vladimir Putin – President of Russia; Patriarch Kirill of Moscow
31	United Kingdom	London	November 9	Working visit. Met with: Sir George Hollingbery – Minister of State for Trade Policy
31	France	Paris	November 11–12	He took part in the centennial celebrations of the end of World War I. He also participated in the Paris Peace Forum. Met with: Alexander Van der Bellen – President of Austria
32	Russia	Moscow; Saint Petersburg	November 21–25	Working Visit. Addressed the State Duma and took part in the Moldovan-Russian Economic Council meeting. Met with the Moldovan diaspora. Met with: Vyacheslav Volodin – Chairman of the State Duma; Dmitry Rogozin – Director General of Roscosmos; Petru Lucinschi – 2nd President of Moldova
33	Russia	Saint Petersburg	December 6	Attended the Eurasian Economic Union Summit. Met with: Vladimir Putin – President of Russia; Alexander Beglov – Governor of Saint Petersburg
34	Israel	Tel Aviv; Jerusalem	December 17–18	State Visit. Met with: Reuven Rivlin – President of Israel; Benjamin Netanyahu – Prime Minister of Israel; Yuli Edelstein – Speaker of the Knesset; Patriarch Theophilos III of Jerusalem

== 2019 ==
#	Country	Location	Date	Details
35	Russia	Moscow	January 29–31	Working visit Met with: Vladimir Putin – President of Russia; Valentina Matviyenko – Chairwoman of the Federation Council; Dmitry Kozak – Deputy Prime Minister of Russia; Alexey Miller – CEO of Gazprom; Patriarch Kirill of Moscow
36	Germany	Munich	February 16	Attended the Munich Security Conference Met with: Aleksandar Vučić – President of Serbia; Sergey Lavrov – Minister of Foreign Affairs of Russia; Johannes Hahn – European Commissioner for European Neighbourhood Policy and Enlargement Negotiations; Elmar Brok – Member of the European Parliament
37	Azerbaijan	Baku	March 14–16	The 7th Global Baku Forum. Met with: Ilham Aliyev – President of Azerbaijan; Boiko Borisov – Prime Minister of Bulgaria; Kerry Kennedy
38	Russia	Moscow	April 5	Working visit Met with: Patriarch Kirill of Moscow
39	Belarus	Minsk	April 11	Working Visit Met with: Alexander Lukashenko – President of Belarus
40	Russia	Saint Petersburg	June 6–7	St. Petersburg International Economic Forum Met with: António Guterres – Secretary-General of the United Nations; Dmitry Kozak – Deputy Prime Minister of Russia; Alexey Miller – CEO of Gazprom
41	Belarus	Minsk	June 21	2019 European Games Met with: Alexander Lukashenko – President of Belarus; Aleksandar Vučić – President of Serbia; Dmitry Medvedev – Prime Minister of Russia; Dmitry Kozak – Deputy Prime Minister of Russia
42	Russia	Moscow	September 2	Working visit Met with: Dmitry Kozak – Deputy Prime Minister of Russia; Alexey Miller – CEO of Gazprom
43	Belgium	Brussels	September 5	Working visit Met with: David Sassoli – President of the European Parliament; Federica Mogherini – High Representative of the European Union for Foreign Affairs and Security Policy; Johannes Hahn – European Commissioner for European Neighbourhood Policy and Enlargement Negotiations; Jens Stoltenberg – Secretary-General of NATO; Sabine Laruelle – President of the Senate of Belgium; David McAllister – Chair of the European Parliament Foreign Affairs Committee
43	Russia	Moscow	September 7	Working visit Met with: Vladimir Putin – President of Russia
44	United States	New York	September 22–27	Working visit. Gave a speech at the UN General Assembly. Met with: António Guterres – Secretary-General of the United Nations; Klaus Iohannis – President of Romania; Egils Levits – President of Latvia; Recep Tayyip Erdoğan – President of Turkey; Rumen Radev – President of Bulgaria; Kersti Kaljulaid – President of Estonia; Kassym-Jomart Tokayev – President of Kazakhstan; David Hale – Under Secretary of State for Political Affairs of the United States; Børge Brende – President of the World Economic Forum
45	Armenia	Yerevan	October 1	Working visit Met with: Nikol Pashinyan – Prime Minister of Armenia; Lee Hsien Loong – Prime Minister of Singapore; Sooronbay Jeenbekov – President of Kyrgyzstan
46	Turkmenistan	Ashgabat	October 11	Attended the CIS summit Met with: Gurbanguly Berdimuhamedow – President of Turkmenistan; Ilham Aliyev – President of Azerbaijan; Shavkat Mirziyeyev – President of Uzbekistan; Emomali Rahmon – President of Tajikistan
47	Japan	Tokyo	October 21–22	Enthronement of the Japanese emperor Met with: Naruhito, Emperor of Japan; Ana Brnabič – Prime Minister of Serbia
48	Russia	St. Petersburg	December 20	Working visit Met with: Vladimir Putin – President of Russia; Patriarch Kirill of Moscow; Alexander Beglov – Governor of Saint Petersburg
49	Turkey	Ankara	December 30	Met with: Recep Tayyip Erdoğan – President of Turkey; Mustafa Șentop – Speaker of the Grand National Assembly

== 2020 ==
#	Country	Location	Date	Details
50	Israel	Tel Aviv; Jerusalem	January 23	Met with: Aleksandar Vučić – President of Serbia; Rumen Radev – President of Bulgaria
51	France	Strasbourg	January 28	Met with: Rick Doems – President of the Parliamentary Assembly of the Council of Europe; Marija Pejčinović Burić – Secretary General of the Council of Europe; Linos-Alexandre Sicilianos – President of the European Court of Human Rights; Dunja Mijatović – Commissioner for Human Rights
52	Germany	Munich	February 15	Attended the Munich Security Conference Had bilateral meetings with: Ilham Aliyev – President of Azerbaijan; Nikol Pashinyan – Prime Minister of Armenia; Edi Rama – Prime Minister of Albania; Boiko Borisov – Prime Minister of Bulgaria; Thomas Greminger – Secretary General of the OSCE
53	Belgium	Brussels	March 3	Met with: Philippe, King of the Belgians; Olivér Várhelyi – European Commissioner for Neighborhood and Enlargement; Jan Jambon – Minister-President of Flanders; Elio di Rupo – Minister-President of Wallonia
54	Russia	Moscow	June 24	Participated in the 2020 Moscow Victory Day Parade. Met with: Vladimir Putin – President of Russia; Dmitry Kozak – Deputy Chief of Staff of the Presidential Executive Office
55	Russia	Moscow	August 4	Working visit Met with: Dmitry Kozak – Deputy Chief of Staff of the Presidential Executive Office
56	Russia	Moscow	August 17	Private visit

== Gallery ==
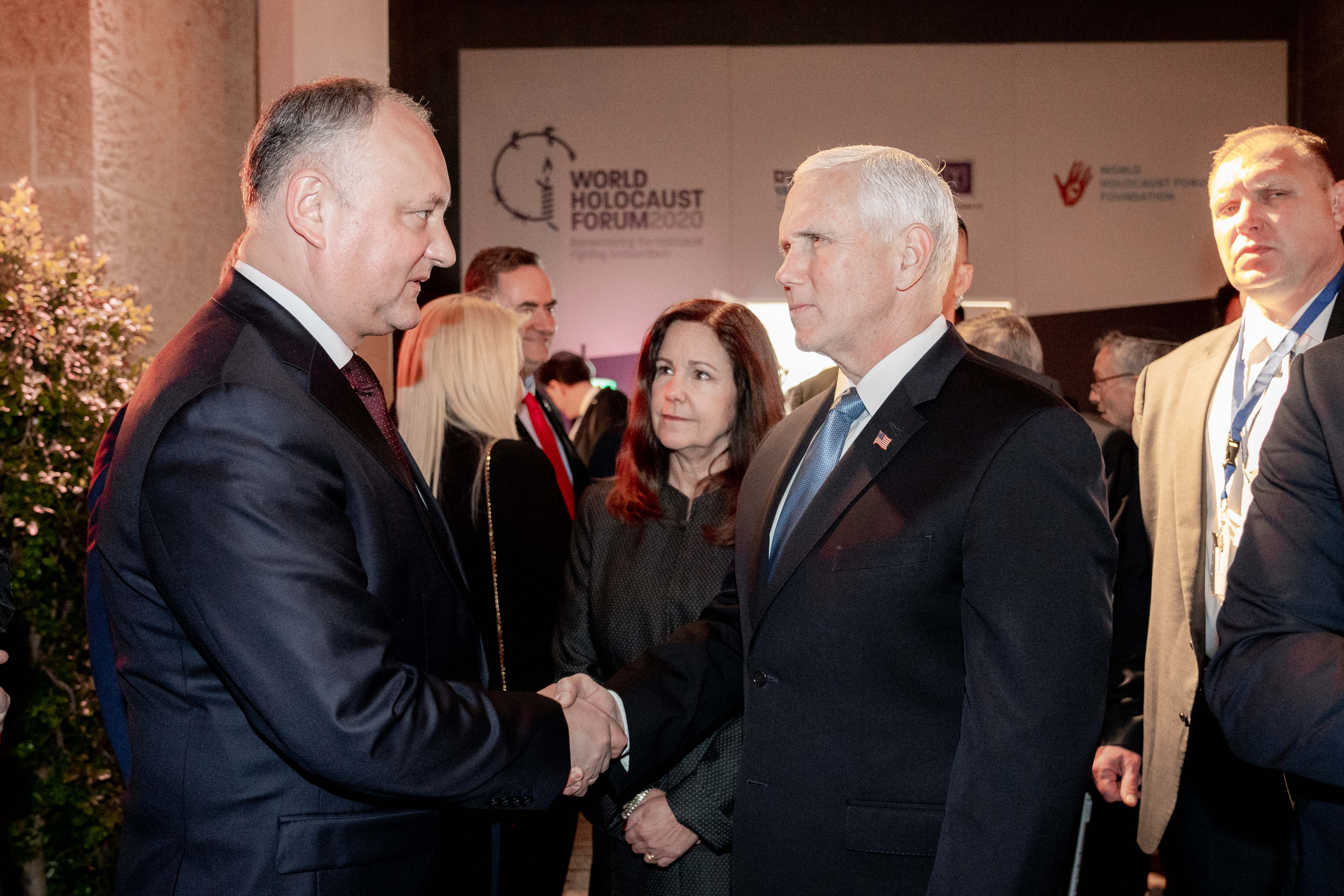
Dodon with U.S. Vice President Mike Pence in Jerusalem.

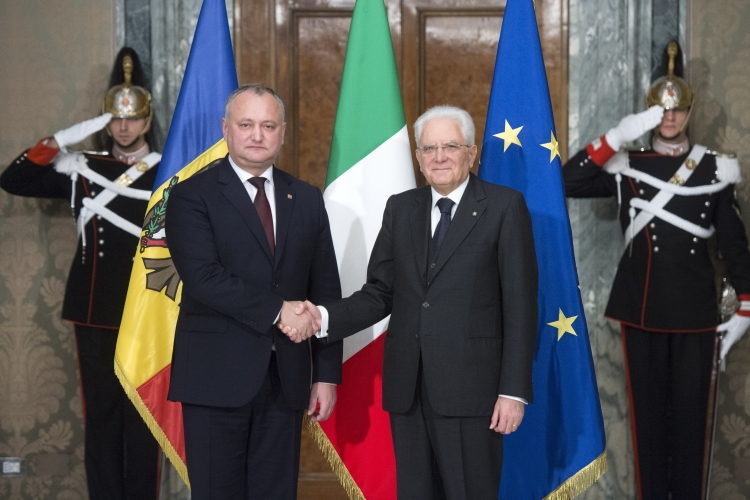
Dodon with Sergio Mattarella in November 2017.

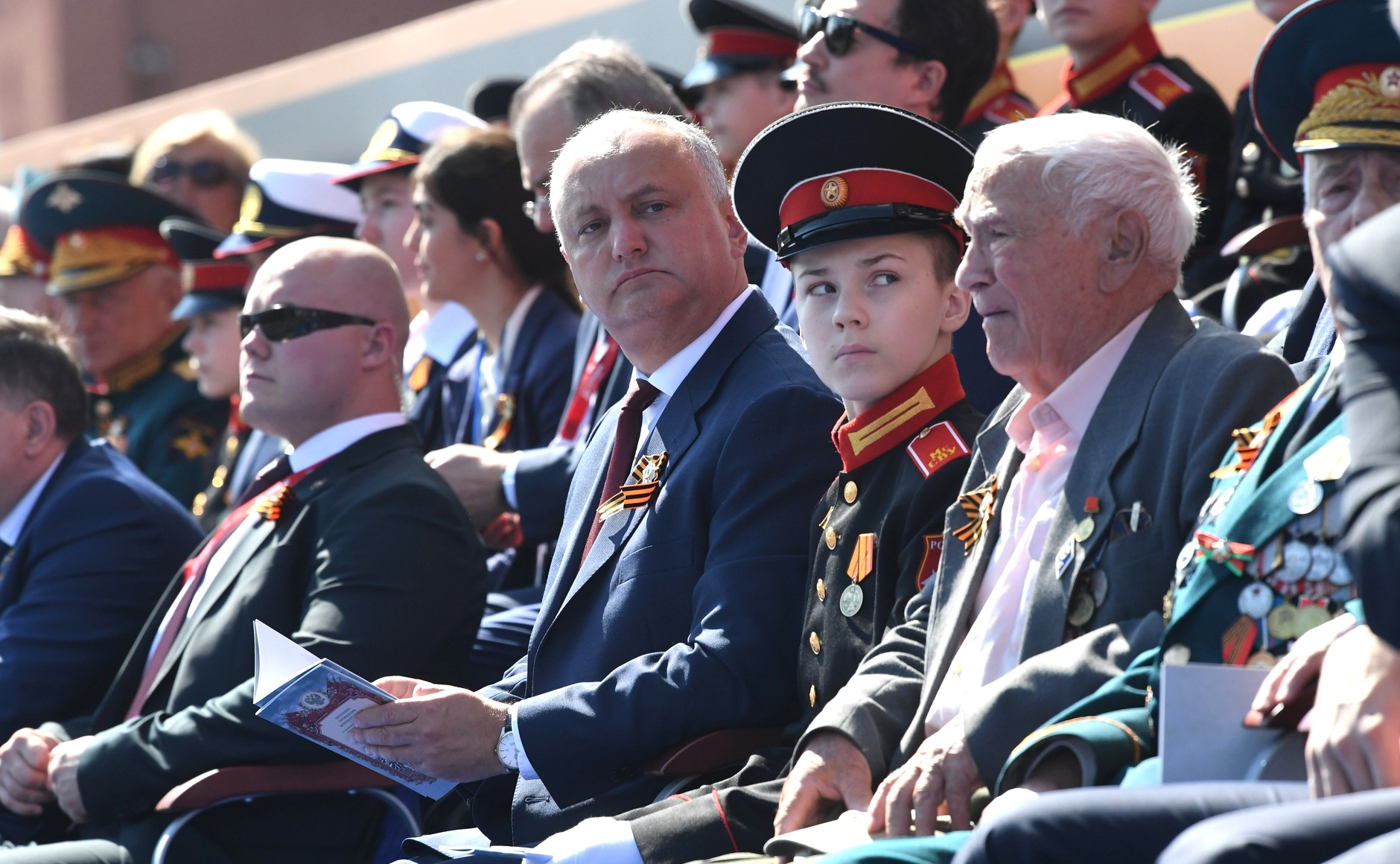
Dodon at the 2020 Moscow Victory Day Parade.

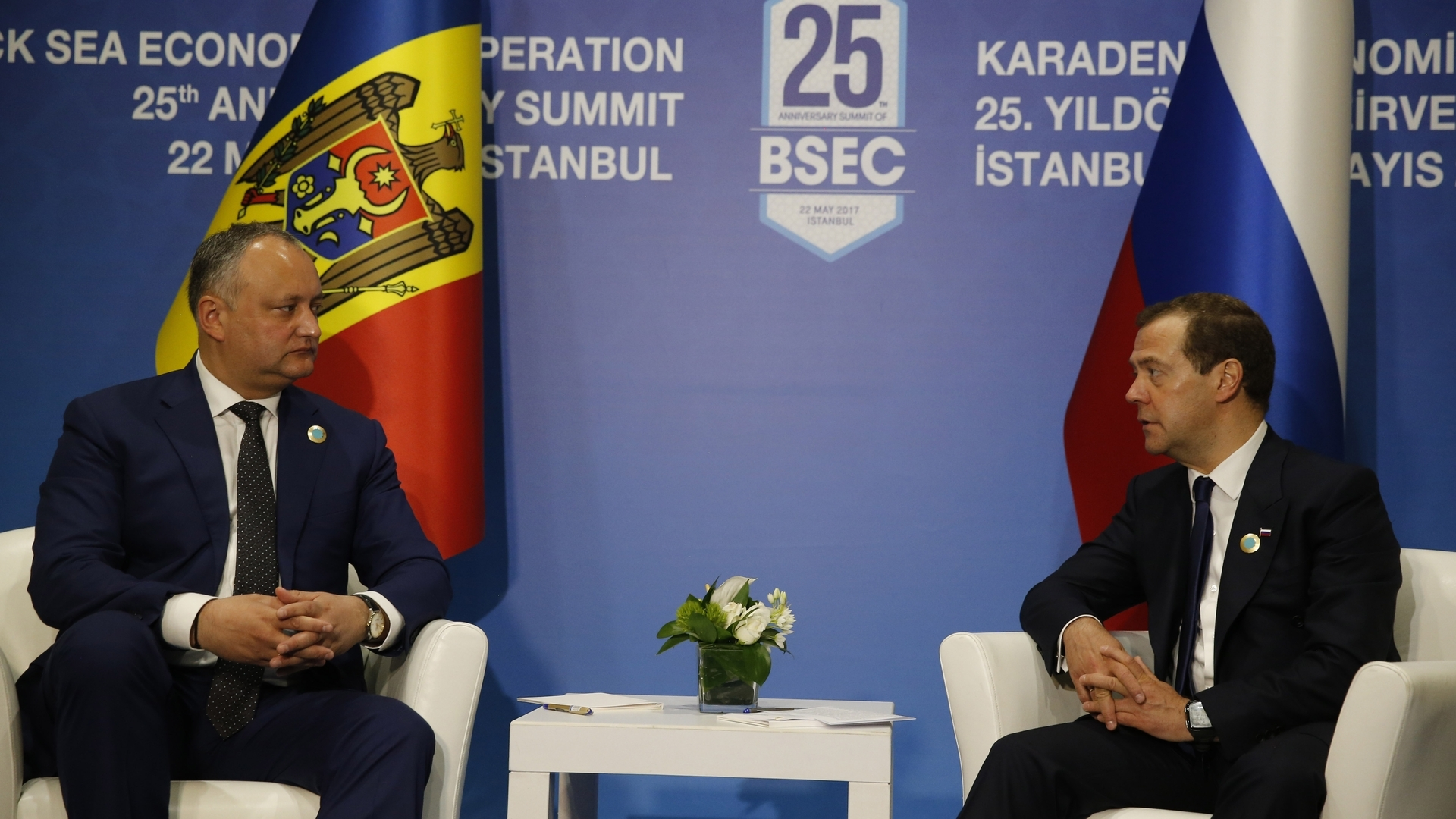
Dodon with Dmitry Medvedev in Istanbul, May 2017.
