= 2019 Saint Petersburg municipal elections =

Local elections in Saint Petersburg, Russia

- 8 September 2019

The 2019 Saint Petersburg municipal elections were held on 8 September 2019, alongside the 2019 Saint Petersburg gubernatorial election, to elect 1,560 councillors in 110 of the 111 municipalities of Saint Petersburg. A total of 7,018 people sought to stand, of whom 5,305 were registered.

Avtovo was the only municipality not to hold council elections in 2019, having held its previous election in 2016.

The campaign, candidate-registration process and counting of votes were accompanied by numerous disputes. Central Election Commission chair Ella Pamfilova later said that senior members of United Russia had intervened in the electoral process. United Russia nevertheless retained a majority of the seats, although its share fell from 77.8 per cent in 2014 to approximately 61.5 per cent.

Litigation continued after the election. A court annulled the result in one five-seat constituency where a candidate had been unlawfully excluded, and a repeat vote was held in 2021. In 2020 the Central Election Commission rated the city election commission's handling of the municipal campaign unsatisfactory.

== Campaign and candidate registration ==
Candidates not nominated by parties exempt from signature collection were required to submit voter signatures. Independent and opposition candidates reported obstacles in submitting documents, including queues formed by alleged sham candidates, restricted access to election commissions and police intervention. In late June, Pamfilova warned that the municipal elections could be cancelled if the reported obstruction continued.

The final figures published by the Saint Petersburg Election Commission stated that 1,340 prospective candidates had been denied registration, 73 nominations had been cancelled and 300 registered candidates had subsequently withdrawn or been removed from the race. Courts and the city election commission reversed a number of registration decisions before election day.

== Voting and counting ==
Voting took place on 8 September. In several municipalities the counting and publication of results continued for days. Candidates and election observers alleged that recounts had reversed preliminary victories by independent and opposition candidates. Natalia Menkova, the Saint Petersburg coordinator of the election-monitoring organisation Golos, told Meduza that the most serious problems were concentrated in several dozen municipal commissions and called for results to be annulled where the voters' will could not be established reliably.

The city election commission approved the citywide results on 24 September, more than two weeks after election day. It reported having received about 1,600 submissions concerning the municipal elections after voting began. Pamfilova attributed responsibility for the problems both to municipal commissions and to the Saint Petersburg Election Commission, and said that senior United Russia politicians had caused serious damage to public confidence in the elections.

== Results ==
The following figures are those announced by the Saint Petersburg Election Commission on 24 September 2019. Subsequent court decisions altered the status of several individual mandates.

Affiliation	Seats	Share
United Russia	959	61.5%
Independents	259	16.6%
A Just Russia	108	6.9%
Yabloko	81	5.2%
Communist Party of the Russian Federation	72	4.6%
Party of Growth	42	2.7%
Liberal Democratic Party of Russia	31	2.0%
Other parties	8	0.5%
Total	1,560	100%

United Russia remained the largest party, but the proportion of seats held by its candidates declined substantially compared with 2014. Independents increased their representation, while Yabloko and the Party of Growth, which had won no seats in 2014, gained 81 and 42 seats respectively.

== Disputes and subsequent proceedings ==
Election results and candidate-registration decisions were challenged in a number of municipalities. In September 2020 the Central Election Commission described the 2019 municipal campaign as having involved systemic violations and criticised the Saint Petersburg Election Commission's response. It rated the city commission's work unsatisfactory and expressed no confidence in its chair. The decision discussed several separate episodes, including the failure to implement court rulings concerning candidate registration in Chyornaya Rechka.

=== Chyornaya Rechka ===
One of the disputes concerned five seats in constituency no. 2 of the Chyornaya Rechka municipality, subsequently renamed Lanskoye. Candidate Pavel Chuprunov obtained court rulings concerning his registration, but the commission did not place him on the ballot. On 31 January 2020 the Primorsky District Court annulled the result in the constituency because he had been unlawfully prevented from standing. Golos described the annulment as an unusual case in Russian electoral practice and reported that the commission had twice failed to comply with decisions concerning his registration.

After appeals and delays in implementing the judgment, the five councillors originally declared elected lost their mandates. A repeat vote was held from 17 to 19 September 2021; United Russia candidates won all five seats.

== See also ==
- 2019 Russian regional elections
- 2019 Moscow City Duma election
- 2019 Moscow protests
