= Viktor Kazantsev =

Russian general (1946–2021)

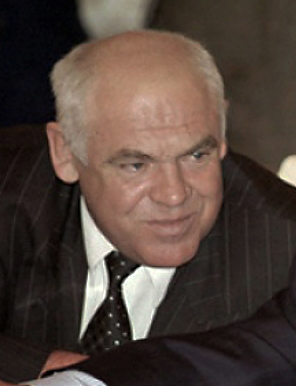
- Kazantsev in 2001

Presidential Envoy to the Southern Federal District
- In office May 2000 – 9 March 2004
- President: Vladimir Putin
- Preceded by: Office established
- Succeeded by: Vladimir Yakovlev

Personal details
- Born: 26 February 1946 Kokhanovo, Vitsebsk Voblast, Belarusian SSR, Soviet Union
- Died: 14 September 2021 (aged 75) Krasnodar, Russia
- Awards: Hero of the Russian Federation

Military service
- Allegiance: Soviet Union (to 1991); Russia
- Branch/service: Soviet Army (to 1991); Russian Ground Forces
- Years of service: 1963–2000
- Rank: General of the Army
- Battles/wars: Soviet–Afghan War; First Chechen War; War of Dagestan; Second Chechen War

General of the Army Viktor Germanovich Kazantsev (Note: Russian: Ви́ктор Ге́рманович Каза́нцев, IPA: [ˈvʲiktər ˈɡʲermənəvʲɪtɕ kɐˈzantsɨf]) (26 February 1946 – 14 September 2021) was a Russian military officer and politician who was the envoy of the Russian president to the Southern Federal District from 2000 to 2004. He performed primary negotiations between the Russian government and the Chechen opposition. Decorated with the Hero of the Russian Federation title, he was involved in coordinating the government responses to various violent actions in Chechnya. Kazanstev was also involved in coordinating the rescue attempt during the Moscow theatre hostage situation, which took place in October 2002.

== Education ==
Kazantsev completed the Sverdlovsk Suvorov Military School in 1963, the Leningrad Higher Combined Arms Command School in 1966, the Frunze Military Academy in 1970 and the Soviet General Staff Academy in 1987.

== Military service ==
=== Soviet Union ===
Kazantsev began his career as a platoon commander in 1966 and served in Transcaucasia, Central Asia, Afghanistan (1979) and with the Central Group of Forces in Czechoslovakia. He commanded the 17th Army Corps (Soviet Union) in 1988-90, located at Frunze, which then became Bishkek in the former Kyrgyz SSR. He was military advisor to the government of Kazakhstan in 1991.

=== Russia ===
From 1991 to 1993, Kazantsev was First Deputy Chief of Staff, and then deputy commander of the Transbaikal Military District for combat training. From April 1993 to February 1996 he was Chief of Staff and first deputy commander of the Transbaikal Military District. From February 1996 to July 1997 he was First Deputy Commander of the North Caucasus Military District, and then from July 1997 to May 2000 Commander of the North Caucasus Military District.

From August 1999 to April 2000, Kazantsev was Commander of the Allied Group of Federal Forces in the North Caucasus, while maintaining the post of commander of the North Caucasus Military District. In January 2001, he became a member of the Operational Headquarters for the management of counterterrorism actions in the North Caucasus region, created by decree of the President of the Russian Federation.

== Political activity ==
In May 2000, Kazantsev was appointed the President's representative to Russia's Southern Federal District. On 9 March 2004, he was dismissed from this post and replaced by former Deputy Prime Minister Vladimir Yakovlev.

== Honours and awards ==
=== Soviet Union ===
- Order of the Red Star
- Order for Service to the Homeland in the Armed Forces of the USSR 2nd and 3rd classes
- Medal for Battle Merit
- Jubilee Medal "In Commemoration of the 100th Anniversary since the Birth of Vladimir Il'ich Lenin"
- Jubilee Medal "Twenty Years of Victory in the Great Patriotic War 1941-1945"
- Medal "Veteran of the Armed Forces of the USSR"
- Jubilee Medal "50 Years of the Armed Forces of the USSR"
- Jubilee Medal "60 Years of the Armed Forces of the USSR"
- Jubilee Medal "70 Years of the Armed Forces of the USSR"
- Medal "For Impeccable Service" 1st, 2nd and 3rd classes

=== Russian Federation ===
- Hero of the Russian Federation
- Order of Military Merit
- Jubilee Medal "300 Years of the Russian Navy"
- Medal "In Commemoration of the 850th Anniversary of Moscow"

== See also ==
- List of Heroes of the Russian Federation

== Sources ==
Military offices
Preceded by Fyodor Kuzmin	Commander of the 30th Guards Rifle Division; 1982–1985	Succeeded by Yuri Kuznetsov
Preceded by Anton Terentyev	Chief of Staff of the Transbaikal Military District; 1993–1996	Succeeded by Vladimir Boldyrev
Preceded by Vladimir Chilindin	First Deputy Commander of the North Caucasus Military District; 1996–1997	Succeeded by Konstantin Pulikovsky
Preceded by Anatoly Kvashnin	Commander of the North Caucasus Military District; 1997–2000	Succeeded by Gennady Troshev
Position established	Commander of the Joint Group of Forces in the North Caucasus; 1999–2000	Succeeded by Aleksandr Baranov; Acting
Political offices
Position established	Presidential Envoy to the Southern Federal District; 2000–2004	Succeeded by Vladimir Yakovlev
