= Governor of Saint Petersburg =

Highest-ranking official in Saint Petersburg, Russia

Governor of the City of Saint Petersburg
- Губернатор Санкт-Петербурга (Russian)
- Flag of the City of Saint Peterburg

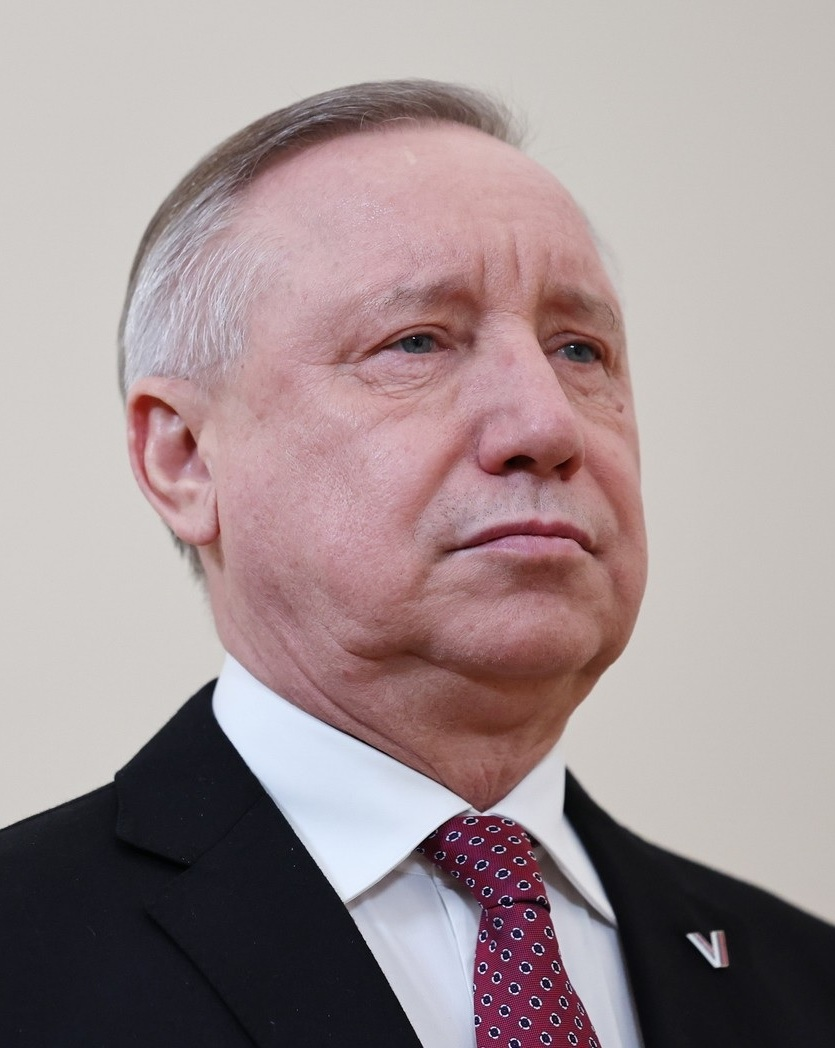
- Incumbent; Alexander Beglov since 18 September 2019
- Style: His Excellency; Mr. Governor
- Type: Governor
- Residence: Smolny Institute, Saint Petersburg
- Seat: Smolny Institute
- Appointer: Popular vote
- Term length: 5 years
- Constituting instrument: Charter of Saint Petersburg
- Precursor: Chairpersons of the Executive Committee
- Formation: 5 June 1996
- First holder: Vladimir Yakovlev
- Deputy: Deputy Governor
- Salary: 9.7 million rubles ($146,290)

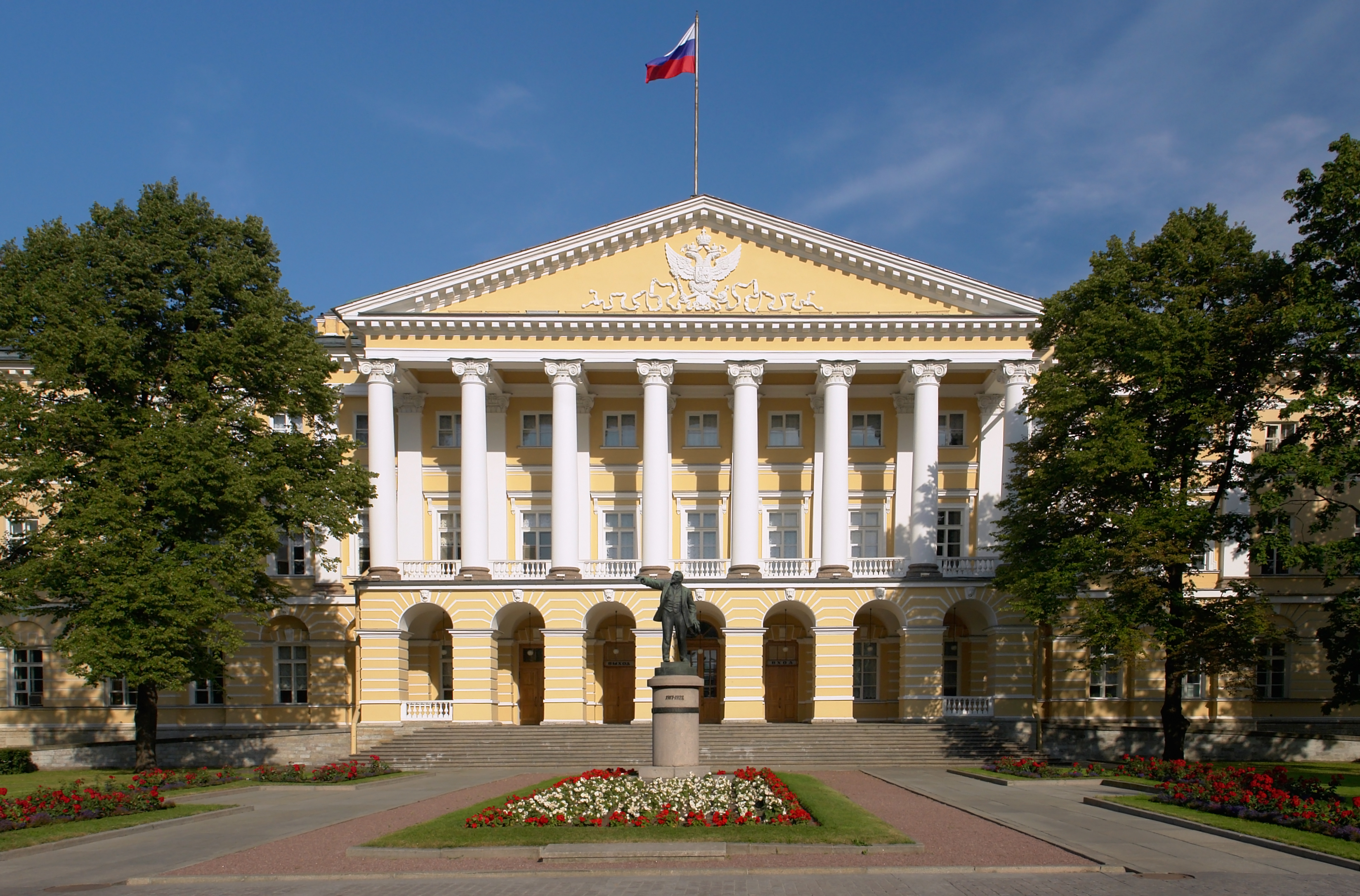
The Smolny Institute, The governor's office

The Governor of Saint Petersburg (Russian: Губернатор Санкт-Петербурга, romanized: Gubernator Sankt-Peterburga) is the head of the executive branch of Saint Petersburg City Administration. The governor's office administers all city services, public property, police and fire protection, most public agencies, and enforces all city and state laws within all districts of the City of Saint Petersburg. The governor's office is located in Smolny Institute and appoints many officials, including deputy governors and directors (heads of city departments).

== History ==
Under the Soviet regime, until 1991 the head of the city administration was called chairperson of the executive committee. Between 1991 and 1996, the head of the administration was called mayor after which they were called Governor. Between 1991 and 2006 the mayor/governor was elected by direct vote of city residents. Between 2004 and 2014, the governor was nominated by the President of Russia and approved (or disapproved) by the City Legislative Assembly, and since 2014 the governor has been elected by popular vote of city residents.

== List of heads of administration of Saint Petersburg ==
=== Chairpersons of the Executive Committee (1917–1991) ===
No.	Portrait	Name (Birth–Death)	Term of office			Political party	Ref.
No.	Portrait	Name (Birth–Death)	Took office	Left office	Time in office	Political party	Ref.
1		Nikolay Chkheidze (1864–1926)	12 March 1917	22 September 1917	194 days	Menshevik	
2		Leon Trotsky (1879–1940)	25 September 1917	26 December 1917	92 days	Bolshevik → Communist Party	
3		Grigory Zinoviev (1883–1936)	26 December 1917	2 August 1920	2 years, 220 days	Bolshevik → Communist Party	
In 1920, the Petrograd City Soviet and Petrograd Governorate Soviet were replaced by a joint council, chaired by Zinoviev.
—		Grigory Zinoviev (1883–1936)	2 August 1920	12 July 1926	5 years, 344 days	Communist Party	
—		Nikolay Komarov (1886–1937)	12 July 1926	7 January 1930	3 years, 179 days	Communist Party	
—		Ivan Kodatsky (1893–1937)	April 1930	13 December 1931	1 year, 256 days	Communist Party	
4		Ivan Kodatsky (1893–1937)	13 December 1931	January 1937	5 years, 19 days	Communist Party	
5		Vasily Shestakov (1891–1956)	January 1937	March 1937	59 days	Communist Party	
6		Aleksey Petrovsky (1889–1939)	September 1937	October 1938	1 year, 30 days	Communist Party	
7		Alexei Kosygin (1904–1980)	October 1938	6 January 1939	97 days	Communist Party	
8		Pyotr Popkov (1903–1950)	6 January 1939	9 March 1946	7 years, 62 days	Communist Party	
9		Pyotr Lazutin (1905–1950)	11 March 1946	22 February 1949	2 years, 348 days	Communist Party	
10		Pyotr Ladanov (1904–1989)	2 March 1949	June 1954	5 years, 92 days	Communist Party	
11		Nikolay Smirnov (1906–1962)	June 1954	17 June 1962	8 years, 16 days	Communist Party	
12		Vasily Isayev (1917–2008)	June 1962	August 1966	4 years, 61 days	Communist Party	
13		Aleksandr Sizov (1913–1972)	August 1966	December 1972	6 years, 122 days	Communist Party	
14		Vasily Kazakov (1927–2008)	January 1973	June 1976	3 years, 152 days	Communist Party	
15		Lev Zaykov (1923–2002)	June 1976	26 April 1983	6 years, 329 days	Communist Party	
16		Vladimir Khodyrev (1930–2024)	26 April 1983	13 June 1990	7 years, 48 days	Communist Party	
17		Aleksandr Shchelkanov (born 1939)	18 June 1990	28 June 1991	1 year, 10 days	Communist Party	

=== Governors of Saint Petersburg (1991–present) ===
No.	Portrait	Name (Birth–Death)	Term of office			Political party	Election	Ref.
No.	Portrait	Name (Birth–Death)	Took office	Left office	Time in office	Political party	Election	Ref.
— (Note: Mayor of Saint Petersburg)		Anatoly Sobchak (1937–2000)	26 June 1991	5 June 1996	4 years, 345 days	Independent (Note: In the 1993 Russian legislative election, Sobchak ran unsuccessfully as leading candidate on the Russian Democratic Reform Movement list.)	1991	
1		Vladimir Yakovlev (born 1944)	5 June 1996	16 June 2003	7 years, 11 days	Independent (Note: In 1999, Yakovlev co-founded the All Russia movement, later part of a larger Fatherland – All Russia electoral alliance.)	1996; 2000	
—		Alexander Beglov (born 1956)	16 June 2003	15 October 2003	121 days	United Russia	– (Note: Acting governor)	
2		Valentina Matviyenko (born 1949)	15 October 2003	22 August 2011	7 years, 311 days	Independent → United Russia	2003; 2006 (Note: Appointed by the president of Russia with the consent of the Legislative Assembly)	
—		Georgy Poltavchenko (born 1953)	22 August 2011	31 August 2011	7 years, 42 days	United Russia	–	
3		Georgy Poltavchenko (born 1953)	31 August 2011	5 June 2014	7 years, 42 days	United Russia	2011	
—		Georgy Poltavchenko (born 1953)	5 June 2014	24 September 2014	7 years, 42 days	United Russia	–	
(3)		Georgy Poltavchenko (born 1953)	24 September 2014	3 October 2018	7 years, 42 days	United Russia	2014	
—		Alexander Beglov (born 1956)	3 October 2018	18 September 2019	8 years, 43 days	United Russia	–	
4		Alexander Beglov (born 1956)	18 September 2019	Incumbent	8 years, 43 days	United Russia	2019; 2024	

== Latest election ==
Summary of the 6–8 September 2024 Saint Petersburg gubernatorial election results
Candidate	Party	Votes	%
Alexander Beglov (incumbent)	United Russia	895,307	59.80
Maksim Yakovlev	Liberal Democratic Party	274,516	18.34
Pavel Bragin	The Greens	176,467	11.79
Sergey Malinkovich	Communists of Russia	120,694	8.06
Valid votes		1,466,984	97.98
Blank ballots		30,185	2.02
Total		1,497,172	100.00
Turnout		1,497,172	37.50
Registered voters		3,992,070	100.00

== See also ==
- Mayor of Moscow
  - List of heads of Moscow government
- Governor of Sevastopol (Russia)
- Saint Petersburg City Administration
- Saint Petersburg Police
