= Charter of Saint Petersburg =

Charter of Saint Petersburg (Russian: Устав Санкт-Петербурга) is the basic law of the federal city of Saint Petersburg. It was adopted by the Legislative Assembly of Saint Petersburg, the city's unicameral parliament, on January 14, 1998.

== History ==
Charter of Saint Petersburg was developed and adopted by deputies of the Legislative Assembly of the first convocation (1994–1998). The document was adopted in the second vote by qualified majority in the minimum number of votes: 34 of 50 (8 votes against and 3 abstentions). Since the Charter in this edition significantly infringe upon the authority of the Governor of St. Petersburg and gave a certain imbalance in favor of the legislative branch power, the then Governor Vladimir Yakovlev, refused to sign it, which led to a serious political crisis. As a result of negotiation and compromise is January 28, 1998 has adopted a package of amendments in favor of the executive.

== Structure ==
St. Petersburg Charter consists of a preamble and 12 chapters:

- Chapter I. General Provisions
- Chapter II. Competences of St. Petersburg
- Chapter III. Basics territorial system of St. Petersburg
- Chapter IV. Fundamentals of organization of the government of St. Petersburg
- Chapter V. The Legislature St. Petersburg
- Chapter VI. Administration of St. Petersburg
- Chapter VII. The judiciary St. Petersburg
- Chapter VIII. Interaction authorities of St. Petersburg
- Chapter IX. Basis of local government in St. Petersburg
- Chapter X. The participation of residents of St. Petersburg in the exercise of power
- Chapter XI. Ownership of St. Petersburg
- Chapter XII. Final and transitional provisions
