= 2019 Saint Petersburg gubernatorial election =

Russian mayoral election

8 September 2019	2024 →
- Turnout: 29.90%
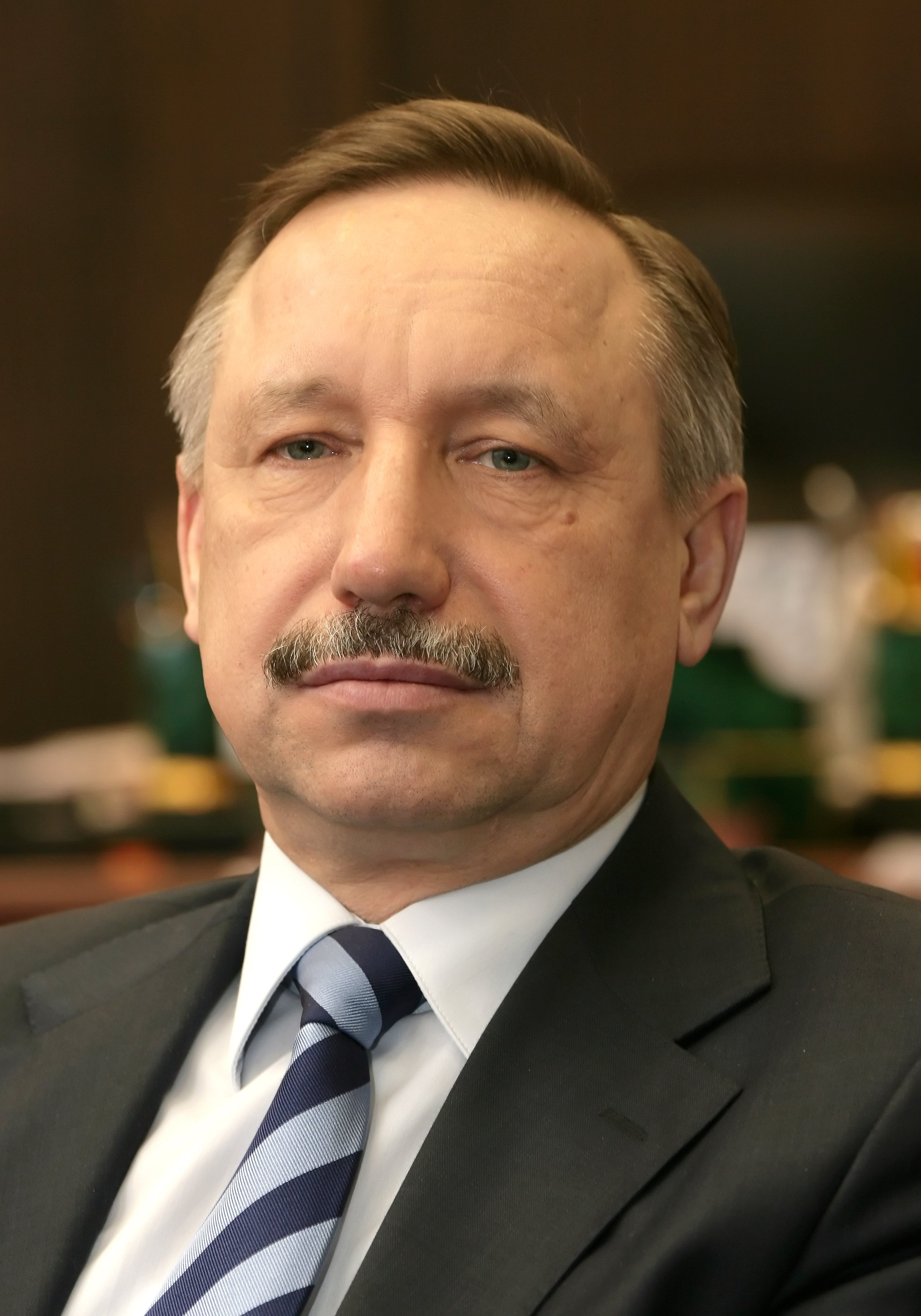

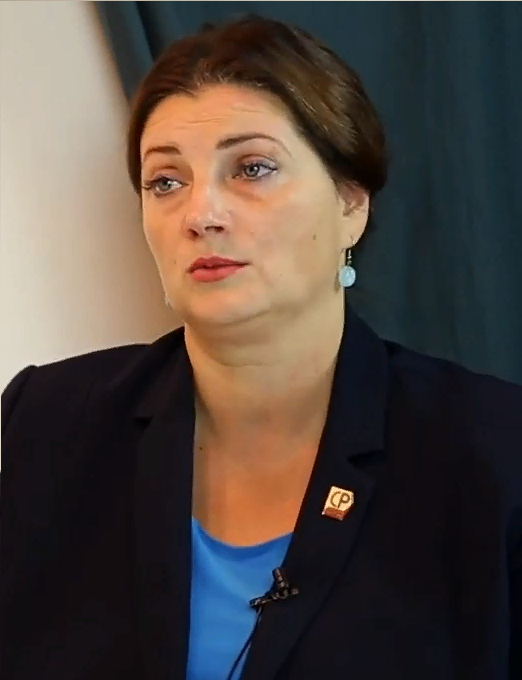

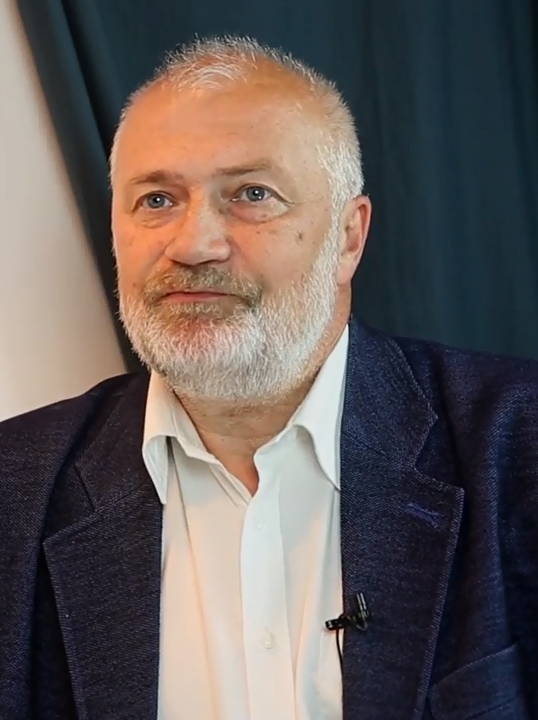
Candidate	Alexander Beglov	Nadezhda Tikhonova	Mikhail Amosov
Party	United Russia	A Just Russia	Civic Platform
Popular vote	734,903	192,114	182,797
Percentage	64.43%	16.84%	16.03%
- Beglov Amosov Digital plots
Acting Governor before election
Alexander Beglov
Independent
Elected Governor
Alexander Beglov
United Russia

The 2019 Saint Petersburg gubernatorial election was held on 8 September. The acting governor Alexander Beglov won, getting more than 60% of the votes.

Initially 28 candidates were declared, but finally only three were admitted and confirmed: Mikhail Amosov, Alexander Beglov, and Nadezhda Tikhonova.

== Background ==
Until October 2018, Georgy Poltavchenko was the Governor of Saint Petersburg, his term expiring in 2019. In August 2018, Poltavchenko announced that he would run in 2019, but on 3 October 2018 President Vladimir Putin proposed him to become Chairman of the Board of Directors of United Shipbuilding Corporation. After the resignation of Poltavchenko, Alexander Beglov was appointed as the Acting Governor.

== Declared candidates ==
At the stage of candidate nomination, 28 people were declared. Some of these were supported by the leading parties in Russia. So Vladimir Bortko, member of the State Duma, was nominated by the Communist Party of the Russian Federation; Mikhail Mashkovtsev, former governor of Kamchatka Oblast was recommended by the Communists of Russia while Marina Shishkina, member of the St. Petersburg Legislative Assembly, and Nadezhda Tikhonova got a support of A Just Russia party. Boris Vishnevsky, member of the St. Petersburg Legislative Assembly, was nominated by the democratic Yabloko party. The Liberal Democratic Party supported a candidacy of Oleg Kapitanov, member of the St. Petersburg Legislative Assembly. Mikhail Amosov was suggested by the Civic Platform, and the acting governor Beglov declared himself as independent.

Finally, only 3 candidates were admitted and confirmed their interest in participation: Amosov, Beglov and Tikhonova. Further 23 people were denied admission and 2 applicants (including Bortko) withdrew a candidacy.

During the pre-election discussions, other names were also mentioned as possible candidates but were not officially declared. Among these are Igor Artemyev, a head of the Federal Antimonopoly Service (Yabloko); Igor Albin, former vice governor of St. Petersburg, former Minister of Regional Development (endorsed Beglov) (United Russia); Krasimir Vranski, a public figure, head of the public organization "Beautiful Petersburg”; Maksim Shevchenko, Member of the Vladimir Oblast Legislative Assembly; Oksana Dmitriyeva, member of the St. Petersburg Legislative Assembly, former member of the State Duma, ex-Minister of Labor and Social Development (Party of Growth); Ksenia Sobchak, former First Daughter of St. Petersburg, 2018 presidential candidate (Party of Changes).

== Final candidates ==
Among the three final candidates, Mikhail Amosov was considered to be a conservative liberal while Nadezhda Tikhonova was seen as a member of the left.

Alexander Beglov was associated with the pro-Putin party United Russia despite his formal candidacy as an independent figure. Alexander Beglov was even before the election expected to win the election, with support from United Russia. However the election result still could not be completely predictable because the ruling party, United Russia, has steadily declined in popularity since the summer of 2018 when it approved the retirement age hike in the State Duma (the opposition parties and overwhelming majority of population were against such a change). Many ordinary Russians henceforth consider a relation of any politician to United Russia as a fact that could compromise their reputation, which is why some people thought that protest votes were a possibility.

== Results ==
The infobox below represents the result of election. In fact, a positive acceptance of previous achievements of Beglov was not overweighted by emotions related to the pension reform.

Candidate	Party	Votes	%
Alexander Beglov	United Russia	734,903	66.22
Nadezhda Tikhonova	A Just Russia	192,114	17.31
Mikhail Amosov	Civic Platform	182,797	16.47
Total		1,109,814	100.00
Valid votes		1,109,814	97.30
Invalid/blank votes		30,840	2.70
Total votes		1,140,654	100.00
Registered voters/turnout		3,814,877	29.90
Source: Decision of the St. Petersburg Electoral Commission dated September 11, 2019 No. 143-2 "On the results of the election of the highest official of St. Petersburg - the Governor of St. Petersburg on September 8, 2019"

These results were published on 11 September. From 18 September, Beglov is officially a governor of Saint-Petersburg.
