= Boris Vishnevsky =

Russian statesman and political scientist

- Борис Вишневский
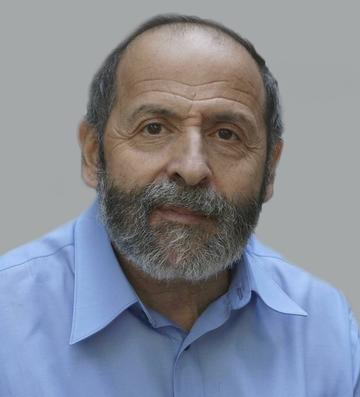
- Vishnevsky in 2020

Leader of the Yabloko faction in the Legislative Assembly of Saint Petersburg
- In office September 22, 2016 – September 19, 2021
- Preceded by: Grigory Yavlinsky
- Succeeded by: Aleksandr Shishlov

Deputy of the Legislative Assembly of Saint Petersburg
- Incumbent
- Assumed office December 4, 2011

Deputy of the Moskovsky District Council of Saint Petersburg
- In office 1990–1993

Personal details
- Party: Yabloko
- Spouse: Victoria Vladimirovna Rabotnova
- Children: 2
- Parents: Lazar Abelevich Krolik (father); Rimma Borisovna Vishnevskaya (mother)
- Occupation: Politician
- Awards: Medal "In Commemoration of the 300th Anniversary of Saint Petersburg"; Golden Pen of Russia Award (2010); Moscow Helsinki Group Award (2019)

Boris Lazarevich Vishnevsky (born 15 October 1955) is a Russian statesman, political scientist, journalist, public figure, publicist, politician, and opposition figure. He was the leader of the Yabloko faction in the Legislative Assembly of Saint Petersburg from September 22, 2016, to September 19, 2021.

In the past, Vishnevsky was a deputy of the Moskovsky District Council of St. Petersburg (1990–1993), chairman of the standing commission on self-government, and an observer for Novaya Gazeta (since 2001). He is a laureate of the Union of Journalists of Russia "Golden Pen of Russia" award. He teaches at Free University.

== Family ==
Vishnevsky's parents are Rimma Borisovna Vishnevskaya (1930–2019, a teacher at the Radio Technical College) and Lazar Abelevich Krolik (1930–2016, chief project engineer at the VNIPIEnergoprom Institute, engaged in the design of thermal power plants, in particular, he supervised the design of the Magadan (CHPP). As teenagers, they survived the blockade of Leningrad.

== Scientific and teaching activities ==
Vishnevsky graduated from the Leningrad Electrotechnical Institute named after Ulyanov (Lenin) with a degree in "Control theory" (1978), in 1978–1990 he worked at Leninetz Research and Production Association. He was engaged in mathematical modeling, information processing, and the management of complex systems. Candidate of Technical Sciences (1988, the topic of the dissertation is classified, but concerns the processing of information for aircraft), author of more than 100 scientific papers and six inventions.

In 1998, Vishnevsky graduated from the Moscow School of Political Studies. In 2002, he received his second higher education and graduated from the Saint Petersburg Institute of Management and Economics with a degree in State and Municipal Administration.

- In 1996–2003 – expert of the State Duma.
- In 1999–2000 – Director of Political Programs of the EPICenter-Saint Petersburg Foundation.
- In 2008–2012 – Associate Professor of the Department of Journalism of the Institute of Television, Business and Design.
- since 2013 – Professor of the Department of Political Science Herzen University.

Author of scientific publications on political science, research of the electoral process, local government, organization of state power.

== Political and social activities ==
- Since 1988 – an active participant in the democratic movement in Leningrad. He participated in the work of the Perestroika club, was a member of the Leningrad Popular Front and the Democratic Russia movement.
- In 1990–1993 – Deputy of the Moskovsky District Council, Chairman of the Standing Commission on Self-Government, member of the Presidium of the District Council.
- In 1995–2007 he worked as an assistant to the chairman of the Legislative Assembly of Saint Petersburg, an adviser to the first vice-governor of St. Petersburg Igor Artemyev, the head of a group of experts of the Yabloko faction (then the Democratic faction) in the Legislative Assembly, Chief Assistant to the Deputy of the Legislative Assembly Mikhail Amosov.

In 2006–2011, he participated in the successful campaign against the construction of the Gazprom tower in St. Petersburg, writing more than 150 articles against the construction.

Member of the International Society for Human Rights. Member of the St. Petersburg Center "Strategy". Member of the International PEN Club. Member of the All-Russian Society for the Protection of Monuments of History and Culture.

On December 4, 2011, he was elected a deputy of the Legislative Assembly of St. Petersburg from the Yabloko party. Before the elections to the Legislative Assembly, Boris Vishnevsky, like Grigory Yavlinsky, together with his party colleagues, signed an "agreement" with the townspeople. It contained a clause stating that if the faction passed to the Legislative Assembly, it would completely refuse official cars. The faction kept its word. This measure saved 900,000 rubles a month for the city budget.

In 2014, he secured the dismissal of the Head of the Committee for Youth Policy of St. Petersburg, Alexander Parkhomenko, due to the fact that he went to the parade on May 9 with a portrait of Joseph Stalin.

In 2014, he condemned the annexation of Crimea by Russia, calling it illegal, and signed a corresponding appeal. On December 13, 2014, at a meeting of the federal council of the Yabloko party, Vishnevsky advocated the unconditional return of Crimea to Ukraine, saying:

Crimea is not ours. It's stolen. The stolen must be returned. Without any explanation of why this is difficult and impossible to do. Imagine that in Russia, some kind of "Self-Defense of Primorye" speaking Chinese would take Vladivostok, referring to "the opinion of the population." The liberal approach should be the same in both cases: return the annexed. As for the opinion of "our citizens", we must understand that the court takes into account the opinion not of those who stole, but of those who were stolen from.

In 2014, he wrote an appeal to the prosecutor's office with a complaint against Andranik Migranyan, accusing him of publicly praising the Nazis.

In 2017, he opposed the transfer of Saint Isaac's Cathedral by the St. Petersburg authorities to the management of the Russian Orthodox Church.

In 2018, he criticized the idea of demolishing the SKK Petersburg, advocating for the preservation of the historical appearance. In the future, for a year and a half, he supported the idea of city activists to preserve this sports complex and recognize it as a regional architectural monument. He sent deputy inquiries and spoke at city discussions about the reconstruction or demolition of the complex until its collapse on January 31, 2020.

In 2019, he announced his intention to run for the post of Governor of St. Petersburg from the Yabloko party in the upcoming elections on September 8, 2019 and began collecting signatures from municipal deputies for nomination. However, he was not allowed in the end, as he did not collect enough signatures for registration.

On January 31, 2020, immediately after the demolition of the SKK "Petersburg", he condemned the actions of the contractor SKA-Arena, which also resulted in the death of a person. In February 2020, he demanded to terminate the city's concession agreement with the contractor and called for the restoration of the complex's appearance.

In March 2020, together with the deputies of the Legislative Assembly of St. Petersburg Marina Shishkina and Nadezhda Tikhonova, he filed a lawsuit against the KGIOP regarding the preservation of the archaeological heritage of Okhtinsky Cape.

On March 29, 2024, he was included by the Ministry of Justice of the Russian Federation in the register of foreign agents.

== Doubles of Boris Vishnevsky ==
Boris Lazarevich's rivals in the 2021 Legislative Assembly elections, Viktor Ivanovich Bykov and Alexei Gennadievich Shmelev, were spoiler candidates. They changed their names: one of them became Boris Ivanovich Vishnevsky, and the other – Boris Gennadievich Vishnevsky. In the photographs they submitted to the election commission, they are depicted with hair, a beard and a mustache like Boris Lazarevich's. They also changed their appearance: both grew beards, and Boris Ivanovich did not have bald patches before, while it is possible that corrected photographs were submitted to the election commission. On September 7, the St. Petersburg City Election Commission dismissed Boris Lazarevich's complaints that the ballots did not indicate the previous names of candidates Boris Ivanovich and Boris Gennadievich. The head of the CEC Ella Pamfilova called what was happening "a disgrace" and promised to propose amendments to the law after the elections, although the CEC does not have such powers.

== Party activity ==
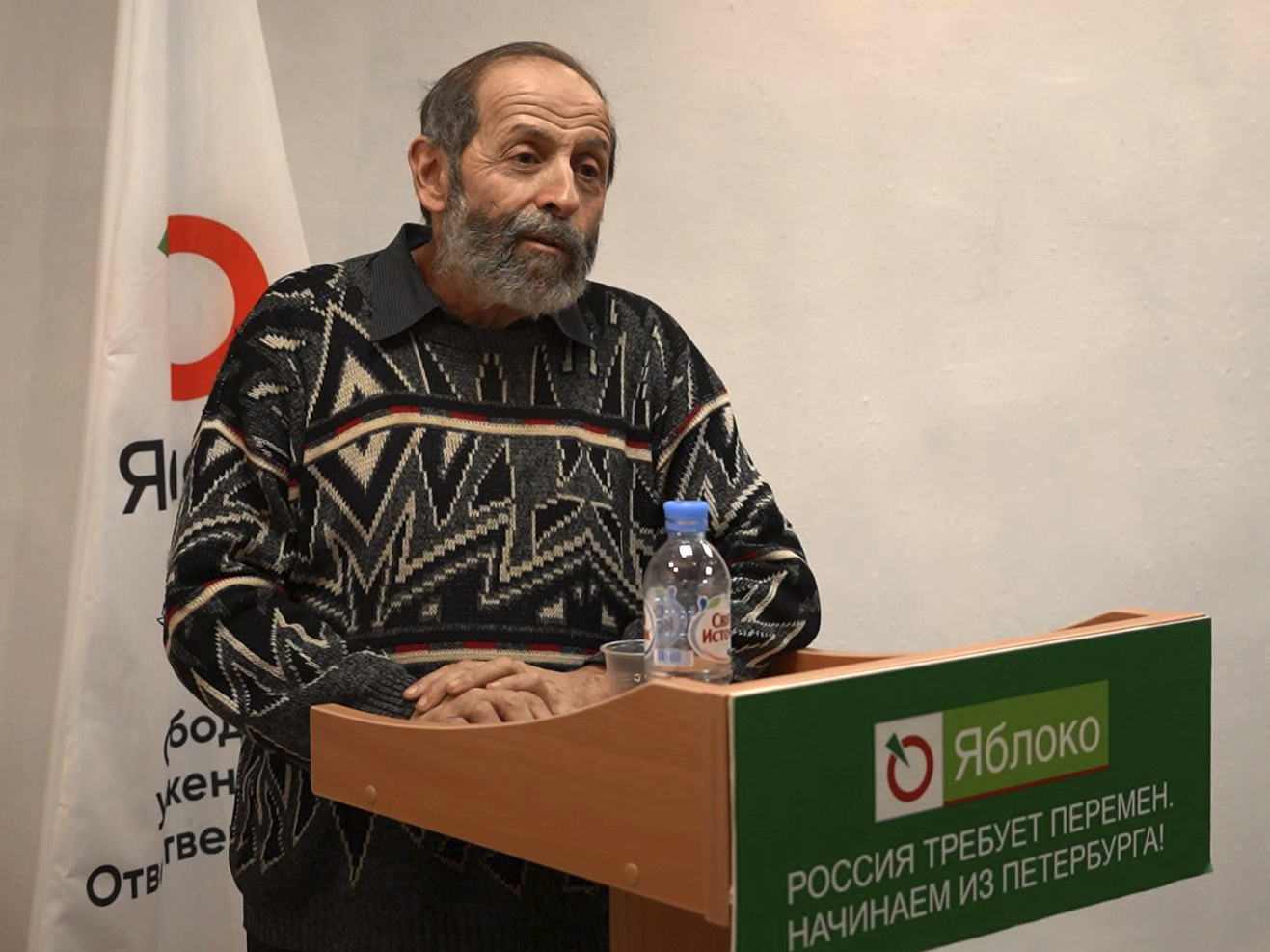
At a seminar at the office of the St. Petersburg Yabloko in 2018

Since 1994 – member of the Regional Party of the center (RPC), which in 1995 joined Yabloko as the St. Petersburg regional branch.

Since 1998 – member of the Political Council of the St. Petersburg branch of the RPC-YABLOKO, in 2001–2002 – Deputy Chairman of the RPC-YABLOKO for ideology. In 2000–2001 – Member of the Central Council of the YABLOKO Association, since December 2001 – Member of the Bureau of the Federal Council of the YABLOKO Party, since 2004 – Member of the YABLOKO Party Bureau. One of the authors of the party program.

On December 20, 2015, at the XVIII Congress of the Yabloko party, he was elected a member of the Federal Political Committee.

On December 15, 2019, at the XXI Congress of the Yabloko party, he was elected deputy chairman of the party.

Participated in all election campaigns from 1989 to 2011. In 1999, 2003, 2011, 2016 and 2021 he ran for the State Duma on the Yabloko list.

== Journalistic activity ==
Vishnevsky has published since 1990. He is a member of the Union of Journalists of Russia, author of over 6 thousand articles in Russian and St. Petersburg media. He is author of six books: "YABLOKO in St. Petersburg" (1999), "Russian Elite" (2000, co-authored with Victoria Rabotnova and Oleg Davydov), "Arkady and Boris Strugatsky: Double Star" (2003), "To Democracy and Back" (2004), "There were worse times" (2008), "No to the Tower!" (2011). Author of the article "Dislocated Souls and Clouded Vision".

He was granted Laureate of the Prize of the Union of Journalists of Russia "For Professional Skills" (2003), Laureate of the Union of Journalists Prize "Golden Pen of Russia" (2010) for publications on plans to build the Okhta Center tower in St. Petersburg. He was awarded with diplomas of the Andrei Sakharov Prize "For Journalism as an Act" Three times (2007–2009).

== Awards ==
- Medal "In Commemoration of the 300th Anniversary of Saint Petersburg"
- Diploma of Honor of the Legislative Assembly of St. Petersburg (December 2, 2009) – for outstanding contribution to the development of parliamentarism, raising the legal culture of residents of St. Petersburg and in connection with the 15th anniversary of the Legislative Assembly of St. Petersburg.
- "Crystal Snail" from the European University at Saint Petersburg (2018)
- Diploma "The Best St. Petersburg Politician of the Year" from the Youth Movement "Vesna" (2018)
- Laureate of the Moscow Helsinki Group Prizes for Human Rights Activities in Russia for his work in protecting the social rights and interests of local communities (2019).
- Winner in the "Person of the Year" nomination of the online publication Fontanka.ru award (2021)
