= Vladimir Yakovlev (politician) =

Russian politician

- Владимир Яковлев
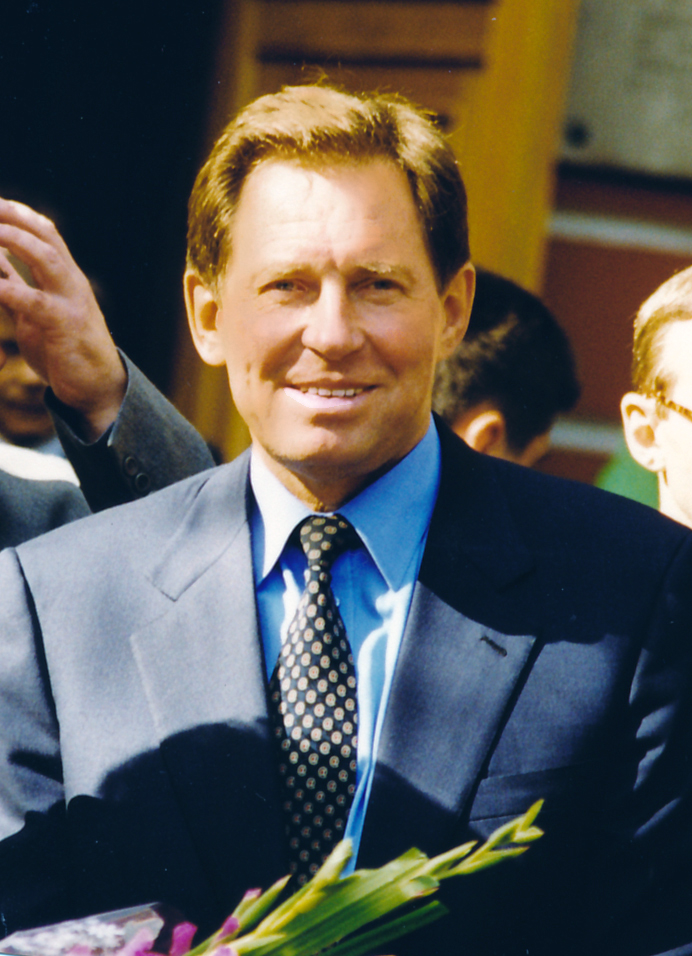
- Yakovlev in 1999

2nd Presidential Envoy to the Southern Federal District
- In office 9 March 2004 – 13 September 2004
- President: Vladimir Putin
- Preceded by: Viktor Kazantsev
- Succeeded by: Dmitry Kozak

1st Governor of Saint Petersburg
- In office 2 June 1996 – 16 June 2003
- Preceded by: Office created; Anatoly Sobchak (as Mayor of Saint Petersburg)
- Succeeded by: Alexander Beglov (acting); Valentina Matviyenko

Personal details
- Born: 25 November 1944 (age 81) Olyokminsk, Russian SFSR, Soviet Union
- Spouse: Marina Aleksandrovna
- Children: Igor Vladimirovich Yakovlev
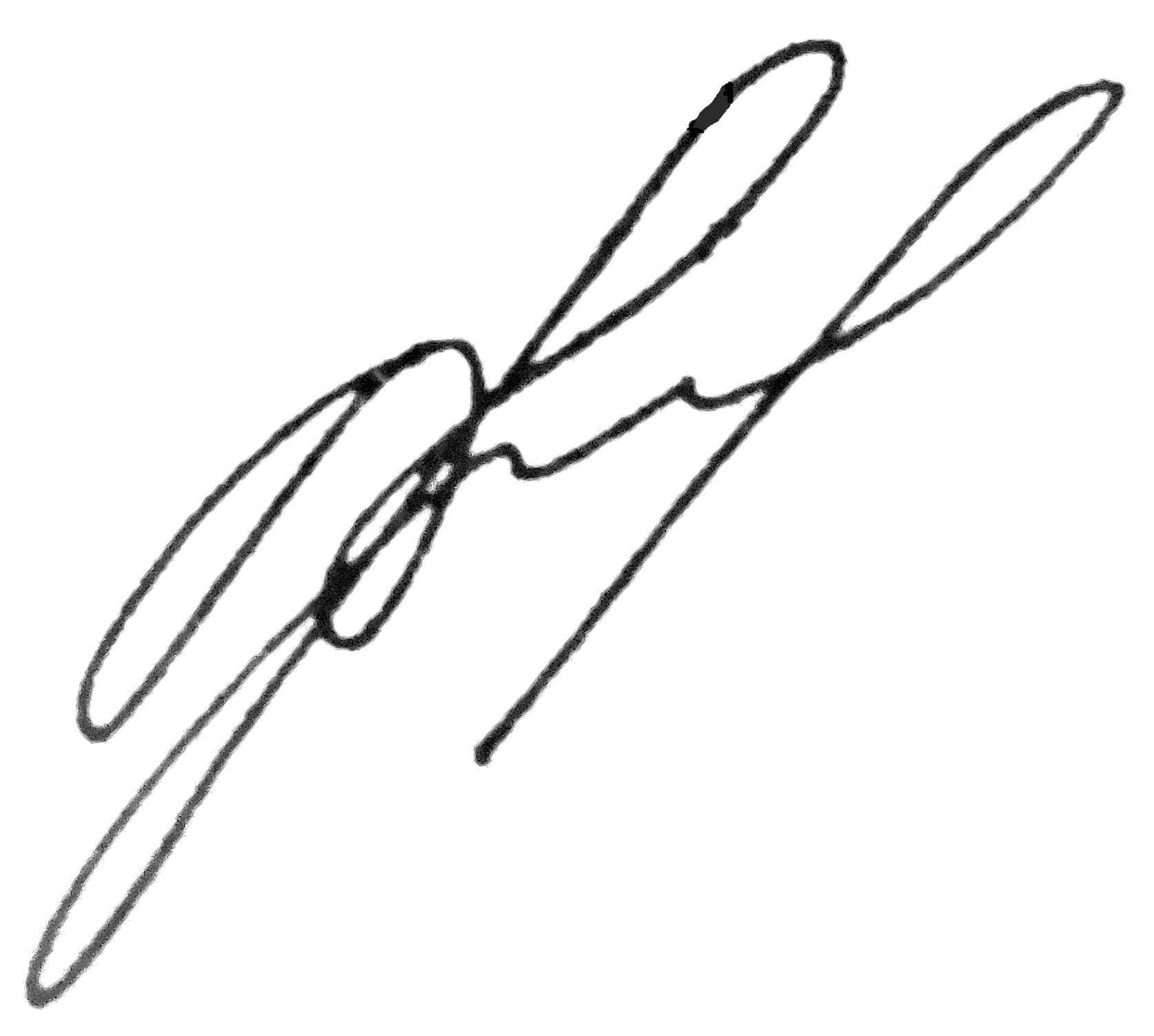
- Signature

Vladimir Anatolyevich Yakovlev (Russian: Владимир Анатольевич Яковлев, IPA: [vlɐˈdʲimʲɪr ɐnɐˈtolʲjɪvʲɪtɕ ˈjakəvlʲɪf]; born November 25, 1944) is a former Russian politician who served as the Governor of Saint Petersburg from 1996 to 2003.

== Biography ==
Yakovlev is an ethnic Ingrian Finn according to his mother's bloodline. He is a candidate of technical sciences, a doctor of economics, a professor of the department of urban economy at Peter the Great St.Petersburg Polytechnic University, an honorary doctor of St. Petersburg State University of Economics and Finance, and an academician of the International Academy of Engineering.

During 1996–2003, he was the Governor of Saint Petersburg.

During 2003–2004, prior to the Beslan school hostage crisis, he was Presidential Plenipotentiary Envoy to the Southern Federal District. From 13 September 2004 until 24 September 2007, he was Russia's Minister for Regional Development in Mikhail Fradkov's Second Cabinet.

28 April 2009 Yakovlev was elected as the president of the Russian Union of Builders and still holds this position as in July 2024.

== See also ==
- Saint Petersburg City Administration

Political offices
Preceded by Anatoly Sobchak	Governor of Saint Petersburg; 1996 - 2003	Succeeded by Alexander Beglov
Preceded by Viktor Kazantsev	Presidential Envoy to the Southern Federal District; March 9 – September 13, 2004	Succeeded by Dmitry Kozak
