= Georgy Poltavchenko =

Russian politician

- Георгий Полтавченко
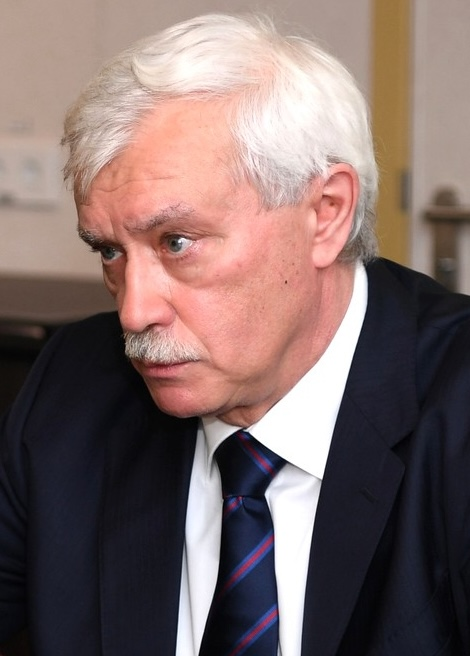
- Poltavchenko in 2020

Governor of Saint Petersburg
- In office 22 August 2011 – 3 October 2018
- Preceded by: Valentina Matvienko
- Succeeded by: Alexander Beglov

1st Plenipotentiary Representative in the Central Federal District
- In office 18 May 2000 – 31 August 2011
- Succeeded by: Andrey Popov (acting)

Personal details
- Born: Georgy Sergeevich Poltavchenko; 24 February 1953 (age 73) Baku, Azerbaijan SSR, Soviet Union (now Baku, Azerbaijan)
- Party: Independent (1991-present)
- Other political affiliations: Communist Party (1975-1991)
- Spouse: Yekaterina Leonidovna Poltavchenko
- Children: Aleksey Poltavchenko (b. 1985)
- Education: Saint Petersburg State University of Aerospace Instrumentation
- Profession: Politician

Georgy Sergeyevich Poltavchenko (Russian: Гео́ргий Серге́евич Полта́вченко, IPA: [ɡʲɪˈorɡʲɪj sʲɪrˈɡʲejɪvʲɪtɕ pɐlˈtaftɕɪnkə]; born on 24 February 1953) is a Russian politician. He has the federal state civilian service rank of 1st class Active State Councillor of the Russian Federation.

He became Governor of Saint Petersburg in 2011. On 3 October 2018, Russian president Vladimir Putin replaced him by Alexander Beglov on an interim basis until the 2019 city election. Previously, he served as the Presidential Envoy to the Central Federal District.

== Life ==
He was born in Azerbaijan in 1953; his father was of Ukrainian descent. He studied at Leningrad Aviation Instrument-Making Institute. After graduation he worked at Leninets Research and Production Association and at a district Komsomol (Young Communists' League) committee in Leningrad. He began service in the KGB in 1979. From 1980 to 1990, he occupied various posts in the KGB, ultimately becoming chief of department, Vyborg directorate, regional department of KGB in Leningrad and the Leningrad region. Georgy was deputy of the Leningrad Regional Council from 1990 to 1993, deputy of Leningrad Regional Council. He was then chief of St. Petersburg directorate, Federal Tax Police from 1993 to 1999. He ran for the Leningrad city council unsuccessfully in 1998. From 1999 to 2000, he was plenipotentiary representative of the Russian president to Leningrad Oblast.

== Political career ==
=== Governor of Saint Petersburg ===
Poltavchenko served as Governor of St. Petersburg from 31 August 2011 to 3 October 2018.

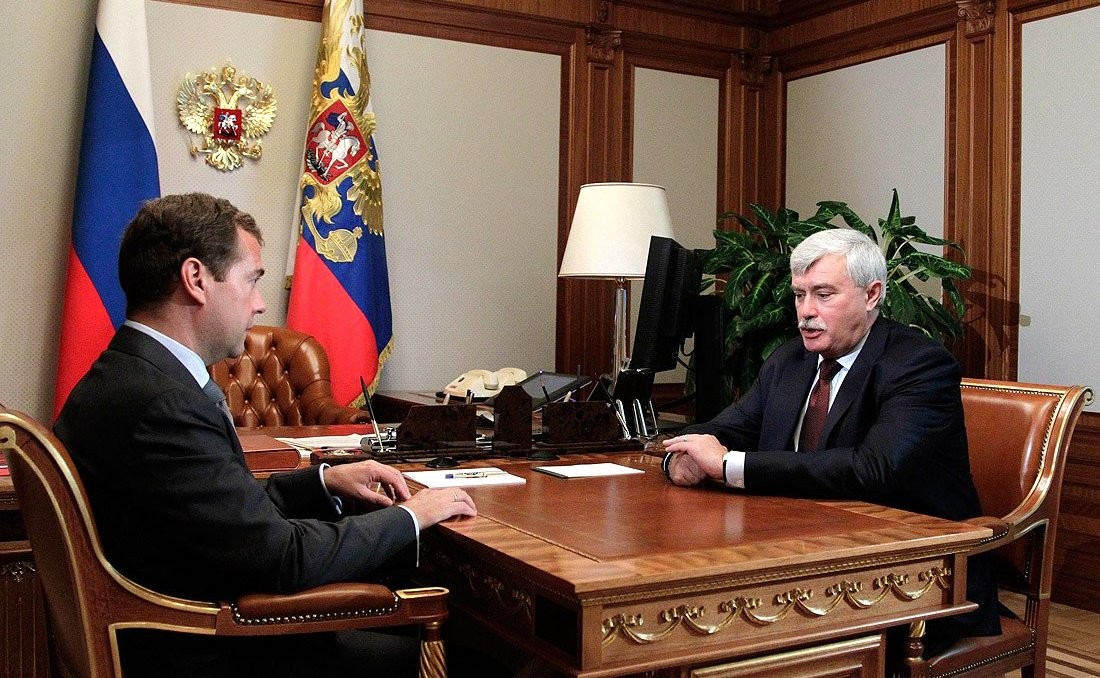
Russian president Dmitry Medvedev and Georgy Poltavchenko, 30 August 2011

On 22 August 2011, Georgy Poltavchenko was appointed acting governor of St. Petersburg. On 27 August 2011, the United Russia party supported Poltavchenko's candidacy for the post of governor of St. Petersburg. On 30 August, President Dmitry Medvedev approved Poltavchenko's candidacy as governor of St. Petersburg.

On 31 August 2011, the Legislative Assembly of St. Petersburg was endowed with the powers of the governor of St. Petersburg. 37 deputies supported his candidacy, while five abstained from voting, and none voted against it. On the same day, he took office as governor of St. Petersburg. He retained his membership in the Security Council in his new position.

From 28 July 2012 to 22 February 2013, Poltavchenko was a Member of the Presidium of the State Council of the Russian Federation.

In the early elections of the governor of St. Petersburg in 2014, Poltavchenko won 79.3% of the vote and retained his position. Poltavchenko used the Strategy for the Economic and Social Development of St. Petersburg until 2030, adopted in May 2014, as his election program. At the same time, critics noted that the elections were virtually uncontested since the leading opposition candidate, Oksana Dmitriyeva, a representative of the A Just Russia party, could not overcome the municipal filter. In this regard, the A Just Russia and Yabloko parties announced their non-recognition of the election results and the legitimacy of the elected governor.

In June 2016, Poltavchenko signed a decree on the erection of the Akhmad Kadyrov Bridge in St. Petersburg.

In December 2016, Poltavchenko transferred St. Isaac's Cathedral to the Russian Orthodox Church. Currently, the transfer process of the cathedral is frozen.

During Poltavchenko's term in St. Petersburg, five stations of the St. Petersburg metro were opened, and the city's highest number of churches in recent history was built.

One of the main reforms for which the citizens of St. Petersburg are grateful to Poltavchenko is the rejection of reagents on the roads in the winter. The streets of the northern capital were no longer sprinkled with salt, which allowed the city to maintain its grand appearance and remain snow-white throughout the winter. The reagents were replaced by granite chips: they do not corrode shoes and are much cheaper for the city. Petersburgers note that winter in the city has become much brighter and more elegant. In 2021, the reagents returned to the city streets due to an abnormally snowy winter.

Poltavchenko solved the issue of heating supply, which warmed the houses of St. Petersburg. According to the old regulations, waiting until the air temperature rose above 8 °C for five days was necessary. Now, heating is supplied to houses according to the weather.

== Controversy ==
=== LGBT Dispute ===
In March 2012, Poltavchenko drew the ire of the LGBT community in Russia after he approved a controversial law penalizing the propaganda of homosexuality. In retaliation, the LGBT community in Russia sent letters to the United States, the European Union, Australia and Canada asking them to ban entry for city officials behind the controversial gay propaganda ban.

=== Plagiarism ===
In May 2013, according to examination of his doctoral thesis made by Dissernet, Poltavchenko was accused of plagiarism: an overwhelming part of the text had been copy-pasted from several other doctoral theses and books.

== Awards ==
Russian

- Russia: Order "For Merit to the Fatherland", 3rd class (2008)
- Russia: Order "For Merit to the Fatherland", 4th class (2003)
- Russia: Order of Alexander Nevsky (2013)

Dynastic orders

- (Russia) Russian Imperial Family: Order of Saint Anna, 1st class (2013)

Preceded by Valentina Matviyenko	Governor of Saint Petersburg; 2011–2018	Succeeded by Alexander Beglov (acting)
