= Alexander Beglov =

Russian politician (born 1956)

- Александр Беглов
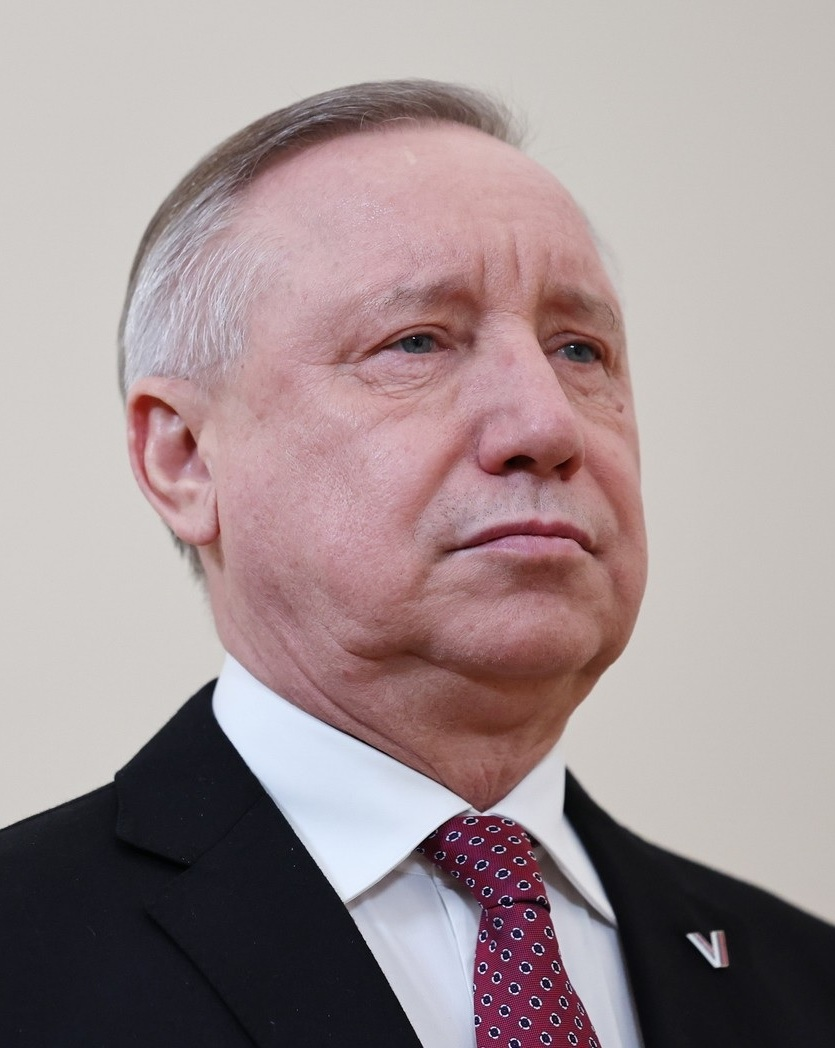
- Beglov in 2026

Governor of Saint Petersburg
- Incumbent
- Assumed office 18 September 2019
- President: Vladimir Putin
- Preceded by: Georgy Poltavchenko

Presidential Envoy to the Northwestern Federal District
- In office 25 December 2017 – 3 October 2018
- Preceded by: Nikolay Tsukanov
- Succeeded by: Aleksandr Gutsan

Presidential Envoy to the Central Federal District
- In office 23 May 2012 – 25 December 2017
- Preceded by: Oleg Govorun
- Succeeded by: Alexey Gordeyev

Personal details
- Born: 19 May 1956 (age 70) Baku, Azerbaijan SSR, Soviet Union
- Party: CPSU (before 1991); United Russia
- Spouse: Natalia Beglova
- Children: 3
- Website: Instagram page

Alexander Dmitriyevich Beglov (Russian: Алекса́ндр Дми́триевич Бегло́в; pronounced [ɐlʲɪkˈsandr ˈdmʲitrʲɪjɪvʲɪdʑ bʲɪˈɡlof], born 19 May 1956) is a Russian politician who has been the governor of Saint Petersburg from 18 September 2019.

He has the federal state civilian service rank of 1st class Active State Councillor of the Russian Federation.. In the 2019 Saint Petersburg gubernatorial election, Beglov won with 64.43% of the votes.

== Early life ==
Beglov was born in Baku on 19 May 1956. In 1983, he graduated from Saint-Petersburg State University of Architecture and Civil Engineering with a degree in Industrial and Civil Engineering, and in 2003, the North-West Academy of Public Administration.

His wife chairs the Civil Registration Department within the St. Petersburg City Administration. His daughter is head of the Legal Culture Committee of St. Petersburg.

== Career ==
From 1976 to 1978, he served in the USSR Armed Forces.

From 1979 to 1985, he worked in engineering and management positions in construction organizations in Leningrad.

From 1985 to 1988 – Head of the Department of Construction and Building Materials Industry of the Lensovet Executive Committee.

From 1989 to 1990 – Head of the Social and Economic Department of the Leningrad Regional Committee CPSU. According to media reports, Beglov oversaw the housing development of the Kupchino, Rybatskoye, Lake Dolgoe microdistricts, the construction of the Aluminum Structures Plant, the Belayia Mel city urban wastewater treatment plant, the Olginsky wastewater treatment plant and the water pumping station in Rybatsky. In addition, Beglov supervised the construction of structures in different regions of USSR's Russia in the aftermath of the 1988 earthquake in Armenia.

From 1990 to 1991 he was deputy head of the capital construction department of the executive committee of the Leningrad Council.

From 1991 to 1997 he served as chief engineer and co-owner of the German-Russian joint venture Melazel. The company had partnerships with the Committee on Foreign Economic Relations of St. Petersburg, which was headed by Vladimir Putin (at the same time, "Melazel" was re-registered as "Olympia-2000"). According to media reports, Beglov acted as co-founder of the Aero Record, Ecotech and Baltikstroy enterprises, the Styk production and transport company, and the Business Partner publishing house.

In 1994 he defended his thesis on the topic "Stability of reinforced concrete elements from the plane of bending", candidate of technical sciences.

From 1997 to 1999 he was a Senior Researcher at the Department of Theoretical Mechanics, doctoral student Saint-Petersburg State University of Architecture and Civil Engineering.

From 1999 to 2002 he was the head of the administration of the Kurortny Administrative District of St. Petersburg. He initiated the reconstruction of Freedom Square in Sestroretsk, monuments to Peter the Great and to the designer of the standard-issue 30 caliber rifle, Sergei Ivanovich Mosin, as well as the fountain "Girl with a fish".

From 2002 to 2003 he was Vice-Governor of St. Petersburg and Head of the Office of the Administration of St. Petersburg. According to observers, this appointment was a compromise by the governor of the city Vladimir Yakovlev and the plenipotentiary representative of the Russian president in the North-West Federal District (NWFD), Viktor Cherkesov. It was alleged that Sergei Sviridov, deputy plenipotentiary representative for cadres, advanced Beglov's nomination. The media noted that the legislative assembly approved the new vice-governor only the second time.

In 2003 he graduated from North-West Academy of Public Administration.

On 21 May 2003 he became a member of the United Russia party. On 9 June 2003 he became secretary of the political council of the St. Petersburg regional branch of the United Russia party (replacing Yuri Solonin); The initiator of his election to this post was the head of the Central Executive Committee of the ER Yury Volkov. On 28 April 2004 he was re-elected secretary of the regional political council.

In June 2003 Vladimir Yakovlev prematurely resigned as governor. Beglov served as acting governor for three months before the elections. In the fall of 2003, he was nominated by the United Russia party as a candidate for deputy of the State Duma of the fourth convocation on the party's federal list (No. 1 in the regional group "Petersburg"). On 7 December 2003, he was elected to the State Duma and refused the mandate.

From 2003 to 2004 he served as First Deputy Plenipotentiary Representative in the Northwestern Federal District.

In May 2004 he became a presidential aide and head of the Presidential control department. In November 2004, at the V Congress of United Russia, he was elected to the party's supreme council. In October 2005, Beglov became a member of the presidential council for the implementation of priority national projects and demographic policy, and in July 2006 he became a member of the presidium of the council. In December 2005, speaking at a meeting with the heads of the subjects of the Russian Federation within the Ural Federal District, Beglov said that the governors would be personally responsible for the implementation of priority projects.

On 24 July 2004 he departed the post of secretary of the political council of the St. Petersburg regional branch of United Russia, remaining a member of the political council (the new secretary of the political council – Vadim Tyulpanov).

From 12 May 2008 – 23 May 2012 he served as Deputy Head of the Presidential Administration of Russia. The post of the head of the administration was taken by former Deputy Prime Minister and Head of the Government, Sergey Naryshkin.

At the end of July 2008 Beglov replaced Viktor Ivanov as chairman of the board of directors of Almaz-Antei.

On 12 January 2009 he chaired the Council under the President of the Russian Federation on the Affairs of the Cossacks.

In September 2010 the case against Yuri Luzhkov was dismissed. Beglova was named among the main contenders for the mayor of Moscow.

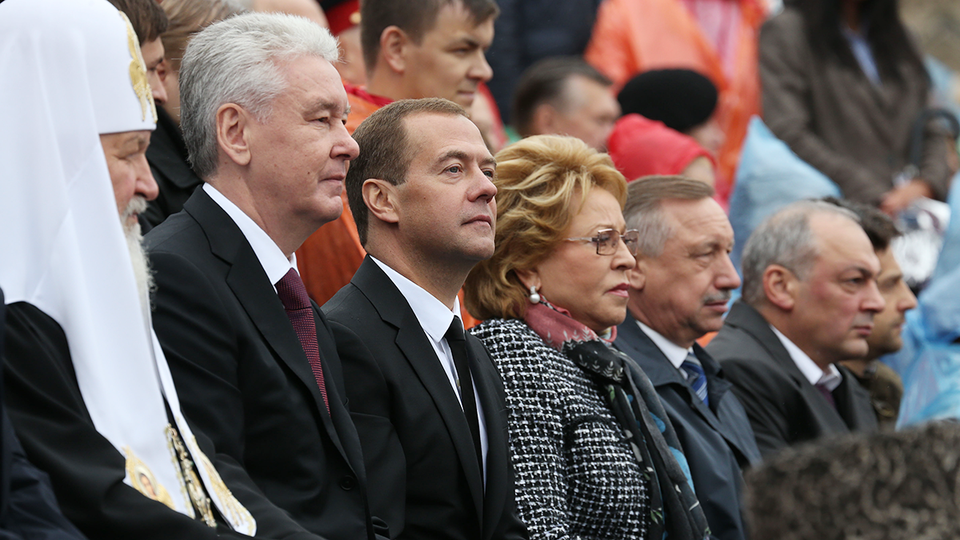
Beglov with Patriarch Kirill, Sergey Sobyanin, Dmitry Medvedev, Valentina Matviyenko and other prominent figures of Putin's government, 5 September 2015

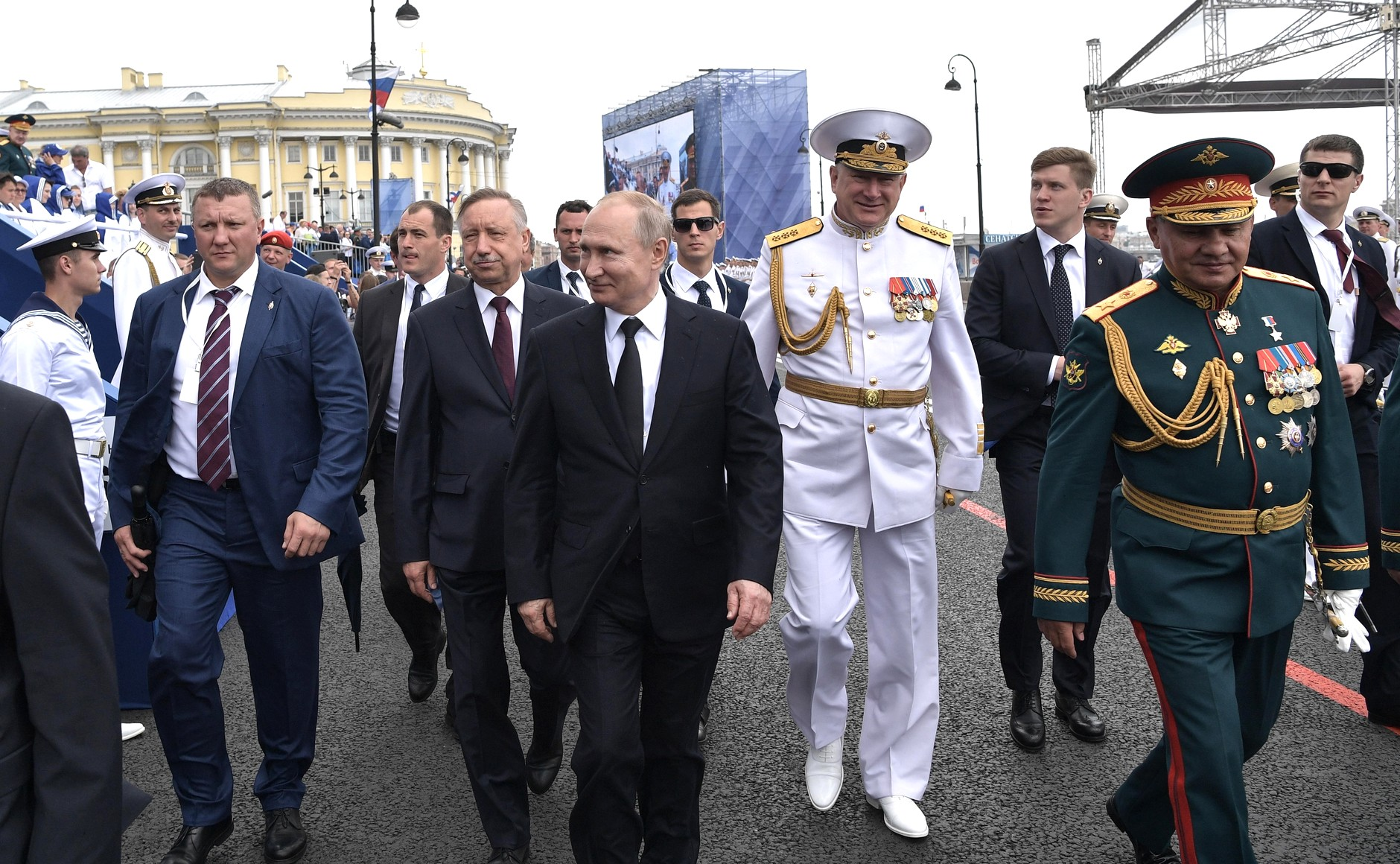
Beglov with Russian President Vladimir Putin and Defense Minister Sergei Shoigu, 28 July 2019

In June 2011 Beglov was considered as the main candidate for governor of St. Petersburg, after Valentina Matvienko left for work in Federation Council.

In 2012 Beglov presented his doctoral dissertation on "Management of the production of agricultural products in Cossack communities as a potential for sustainable socio-economic development of regions".

On 23 May 2012, Putin appointed Beglov Presidential Plenipotentiary to Russia in Central Federal District. On 25 December 2017, a Decree of the President of Russia, appointing Beglov as Plenipotentiary Representative of the President Russia in North-West Federal District.

On 3 October 2018 Beglov was appointed as a Governor of Saint Petersburg. In September 2019 he won the gubernatorial election (with a result of over 60% votes leaving the other candidates far behind) and assumed the office on 18 September 2019.

He clashed with Wagner Group head Yevgeniy Prigozhin in November 2022, when his officials refused a permit for an office in Saint Petersburg. Prigozhin accused Beglov of "financially supporting Ukrainian nationalists” and "betraying Russia" and demanded his resignation as governor.

About the Russian invasion of Ukraine, he has explained that "There's no need to explain what values we're defending to these guys who, instead of two bathrooms in schools (one for girls and one for boys), have seen three bathrooms: one for girls, one for boys, and one for gender-neutral people".

== Awards ==
- 2006, 2012, 2021 - Order "For Merit to the Fatherland", II, III and IV degree
- 2006 - Certificate of Honor of the Government of the Russian Federation
- 2019 - Order of Friendship (South Ossetia)
- 2004 - Honored Builder of the Russian Federation
- 2011 - Order of Holy Prince Daniel of Moscow I degree
- Order of St. Sergius of Radonezh I degree

=== Sanctions ===
He was sanctioned by Canada under the Special Economic Measures Act (S.C. 1992, c. 17) in relation to the Russian invasion of Ukraine for Grave Breach of International Peace and Security, and by the UK government in 2022 in relation to the Russo-Ukrainian War.

In response to the 2022 Russian invasion of Ukraine, on 6 April 2022 the Office of Foreign Assets Control of the United States Department of the Treasury added Beglov to its list of persons sanctioned pursuant to Executive Order 14024.

== Footnotes ==
Political offices
Preceded by Vladimir Yakovlev	Governor of Saint Petersburg; Acting; 2003	Succeeded by Valentina Matviyenko
Preceded by Georgy Poltavchenko	Governor of Saint Petersburg; 2019–present	Incumbent
