= Putinism =

Political system in Russia under Vladimir Putin

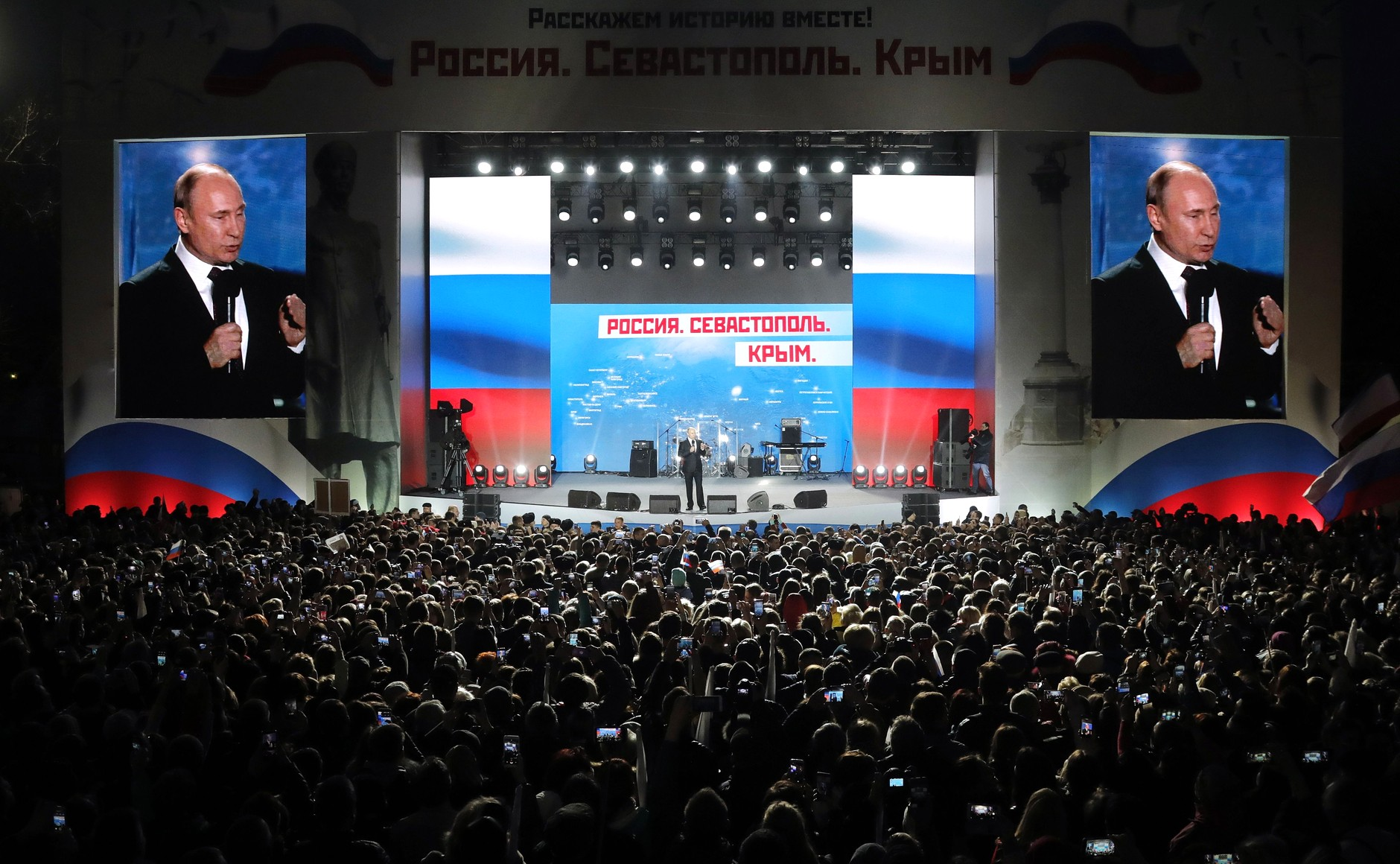
Putin at the rally "Russia. Sevastopol. Crimea", dedicated to the fourth anniversary of the Russian annexation of Crimea, 2018

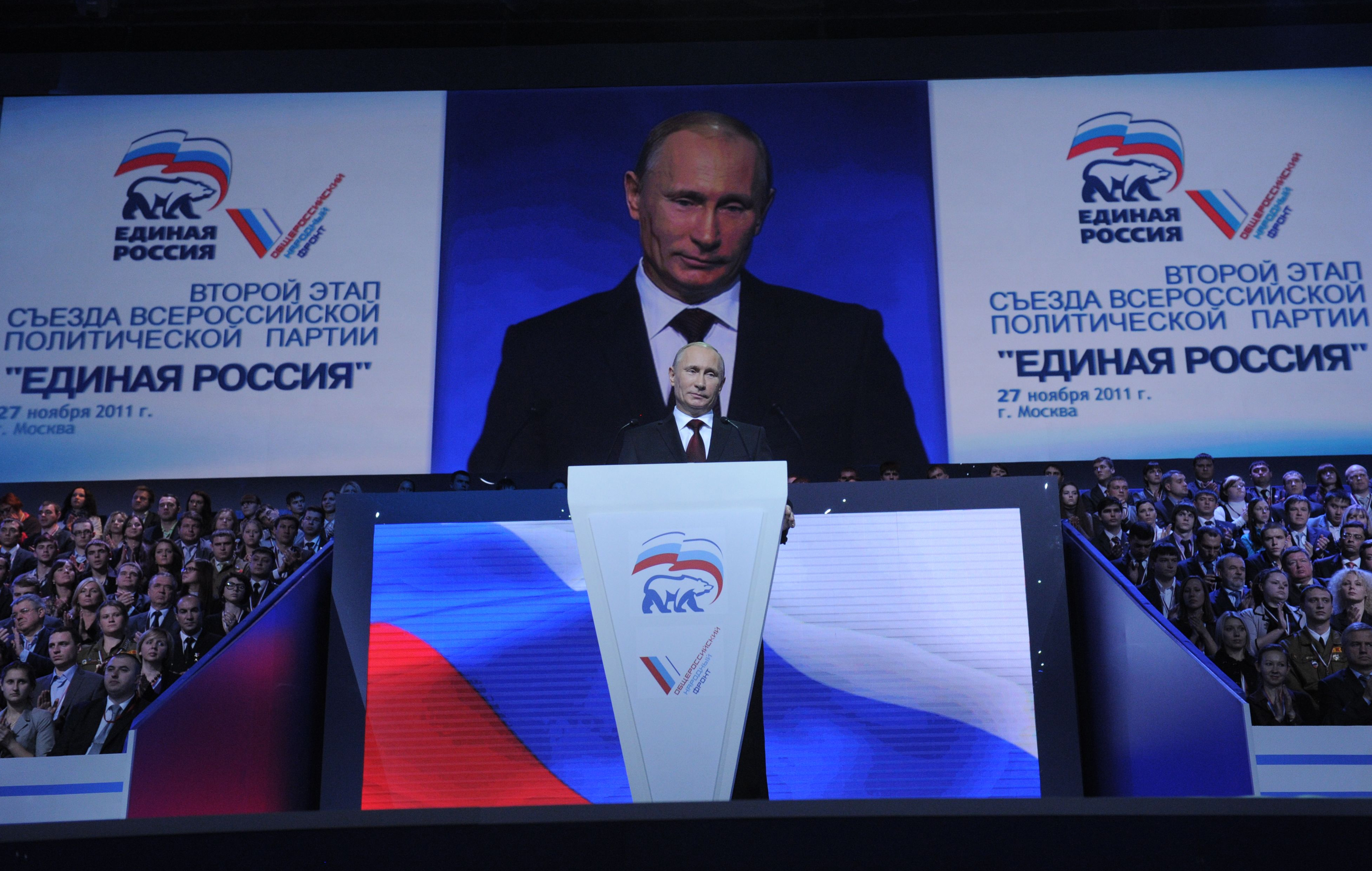
Vladimir Putin at the party congress of United Russia in 2011

Putinism (Russian: путинизм, romanized: putinizm) is the social, political, and economic system, and the ideology formed in Russia during the political leadership of Vladimir Putin. In the course of his rule, Putin has consolidated an authoritarian system characterized by concentration of power in the hands of Putin and elite groups loyal to him. Its ideology has been reliant on statism, Russian nationalism and imperialism, and illiberalism. Arnold Beichman wrote in 2007 "Putinism in the 21st century has become as significant a watchword as Stalinism was in the 20th." Its relation to fascism is a topic of debate, with various authors noting the similarities of Putinism to fascism.

Putin's governance has been analyzed in different terms: as the state 'privatized' in the 1990s becoming a corporation managed by Putin's close associates and friends who gradually became a leading group of Russian oligarchs and "seized control over the financial, media and administrative resources of the Russian state"; as a takeover over the state by "Chekists", the former secret police and intelligence officers who restricted democratic freedoms and human rights, turning Russia into an "FSB state"; and also as a "mafia state" and kleptocracy. The key actors of the regime have been pointed out as Putin's "cronies", many of whom he established ties with when serving in the KGB. A Novaya Gazeta journalist claimed in 2004 that the majority from them were "siloviks", current and former "people with shoulder marks", coming from a total of 22 governmental enforcement agencies, the majority of them being the Federal Security Service (FSB), Ministry of Internal Affairs of Russia, Armed Forces of Russia, and National Guard of Russia - or people affiliated with the "siloviki". The terms illiberal democracy and illiberalism have also been applied to Putinism.

Mass de-politicization has been described as an important element of Putinism's social course. Mass social involvement being discouraged, politics are reduced to "pure management" left to those who are in power, free from interference by the masses, according to some experts. On the other hand, at least certain nationalist mobilization has been present in Putinism, especially of 2022, created through aggressive indoctrination and encouraging groupings of people; but while Putin still organizes mass rallies of his supporters, the feeling of connection is more principally created through television propaganda and online spaces, where the mobilization is often chanelled.

== Terminology ==
Putinism was first used in the article by Andrey Piontkovsky published on 11 January 2000 in Sovetskaya Rossiya, and placed on the Yabloko website on the same day. He characterized Putinism as "the highest and final stage of bandit capitalism in Russia, the stage where, as one half-forgotten classic said, the bourgeoisie throws the flag of the democratic freedoms and the human rights overboard; and also as a war, 'consolidation' of the nation on the ground of hatred against some ethnic group, attack on freedom of speech and information brainwashing, isolation from the outside world and further economic degradation".

== Characteristics ==
Sociologists, economists, and political scientists emphasize different features of the system. M. Urnov and V. Kasamara established among political scientists "direct signs of the departure of the current political system of Russia from the basic principles of competition policy".

=== Characteristics of Putinism highlighted by publicists and journalists ===
- Authoritarianism;
- Personality cult of Putin as a "national hero", through glorification in the media;
- Strong presidential power, strengthened even in comparison with the era of Boris Yeltsin;
- Strong state control over property;
- "sovereign democracy", i.e. a system where Putin works with the "oligarchs created by chaotic, free-market, crony capitalism", who in turn show "absolute fealty";
- Elements of nepotism (cooperative Ozero);
- Reliance on siloviki (people from several dozen security agencies, many of whom worked with Putin before he came to power);
- Selective application of justice, arbitrary application of the law ("Everything is for the friends, the law is for the enemies");
- Relatively liberal but non-transparent financial and tax policies;
- "manual control" mode, a weak technical government that does not have any political weight, with real control of the country from the presidential administration;
- Utmost secrecy of power and backstage making of key decisions;
- "conservative resistance" to the Western "decadence" of irreligion, "same-sex marriage, radical feminism, homosexuality, mass immigration", that is being globalized "under the cover of democracy and human rights";
- Embrace of the values of orthodox Christianity against liberal cosmopolitanism but also support for other anti-liberal, hard right authoritarians outside of Russia;
- Using the claim of protecting "our common Fatherland, Great Rus", as a "spiritual cover for ... kleptocracy";
- Authorities' dislike of freedom to express their opinion, censorship;
  Russian President Putin with religious leaders of Russia, 2015. Putin has promoted religious traditionalism and the rejection of some Western liberal principles, such as toleration of homosexuality.
- Strategic relations with The Holy Synod of the Russian Orthodox Church, protecting the property interests of the church, and a policy of promoting clericalization of society;
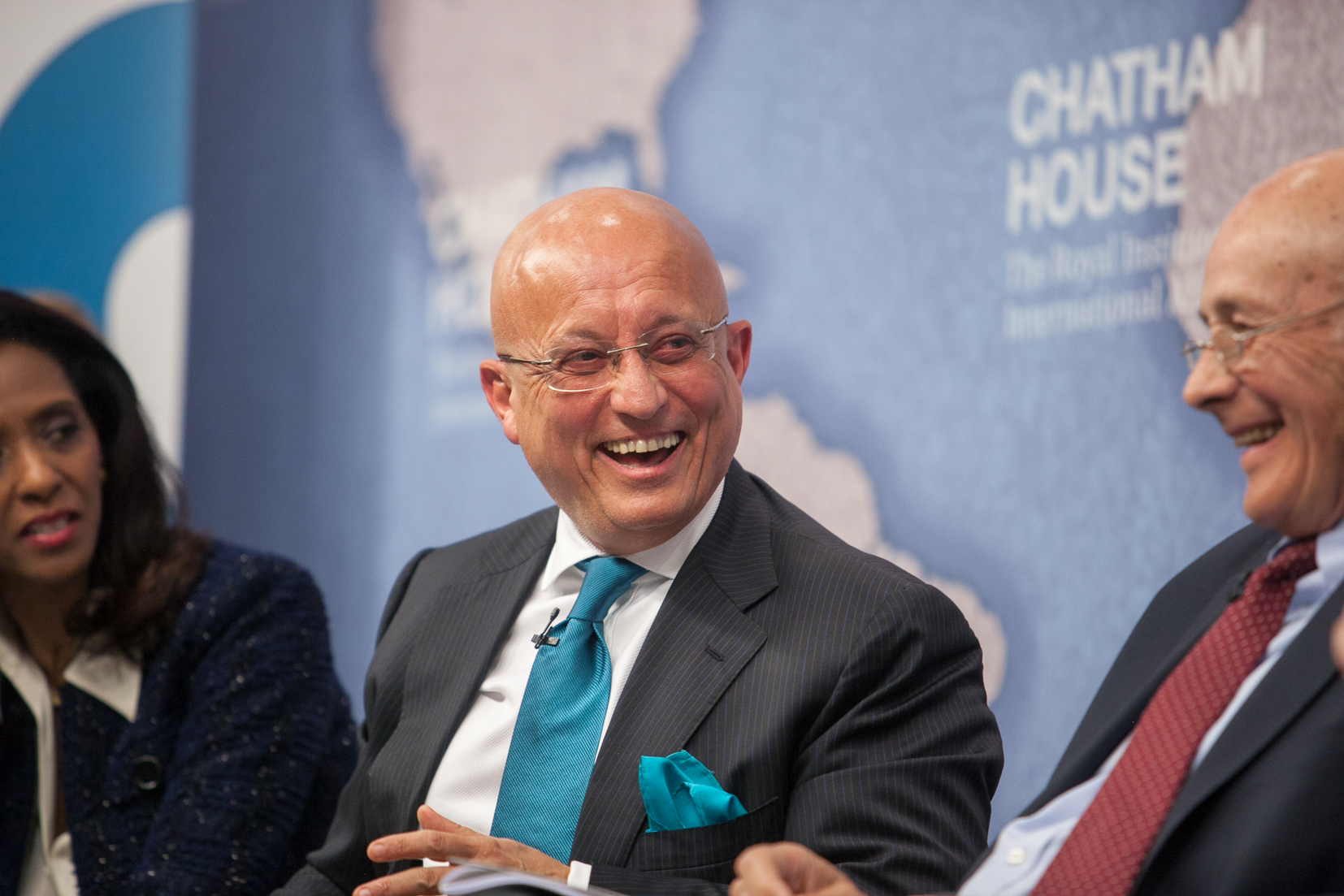
  Sergey Karaganov, who is considered close to Putin, formulated many of the core ideas that led to Russia's invasion of Ukraine.
- Eurasianism that posits that Russian civilization does not belong in the "European" or "Asian" categories but instead to the geopolitical concept of Eurasia, therefore making Russia a standalone civilization;
- All-Russian variant of ultranationalism;
- In the international arena, Putinism is characterized by nostalgia for Soviet times and a desire to regain the situation before 1989 when the Soviet Union competed on a strong footing with United States in international affairs. Energy is used as an instrument of international politics (so-called "pipeline diplomacy");
  - In response to the Russo-Ukrainian war, Putinism has been characterised by Western politicians as "authoritarianism, ... imperialism, ... ethno-nationalism."

=== Characteristics of Putinism highlighted by political scientists ===
- Centralization, strong presidential power, weakening of the political influence of regional elites and big business;
- Establishment of direct or indirect state control over the main television channels of the country, censorship;
- The ever-increasing use of the "administrative resource" (fraud) in elections at the regional and federal levels;
- The actual elimination of the system of separation of powers, the establishment of control over the judicial system;
- Non-public style of political behavior;
- Monopolization of political power in the hands of the president;
- Priority of state interests over the interests of the individual, restriction of the rights of citizens, reprisals against civil society;
- Creating an image of a "besieged fortress", equating opposition activities with hostility, and ousting it from the political field;
- Putin's personality cult, the embodiment of state succession in it after a serious injury from the collapse of the Soviet Union;
- Bureaucratic authoritarianism, the presence of the ruling party merged with the bureaucratic apparatus;
- State corporativism;
- Strong state control over property;
- Aggressive foreign policy (jingoism);
- Focus on order and conservative values;
- Ideology of national greatness;
- Anti-Western sentiment.

=== Silovik influence ===
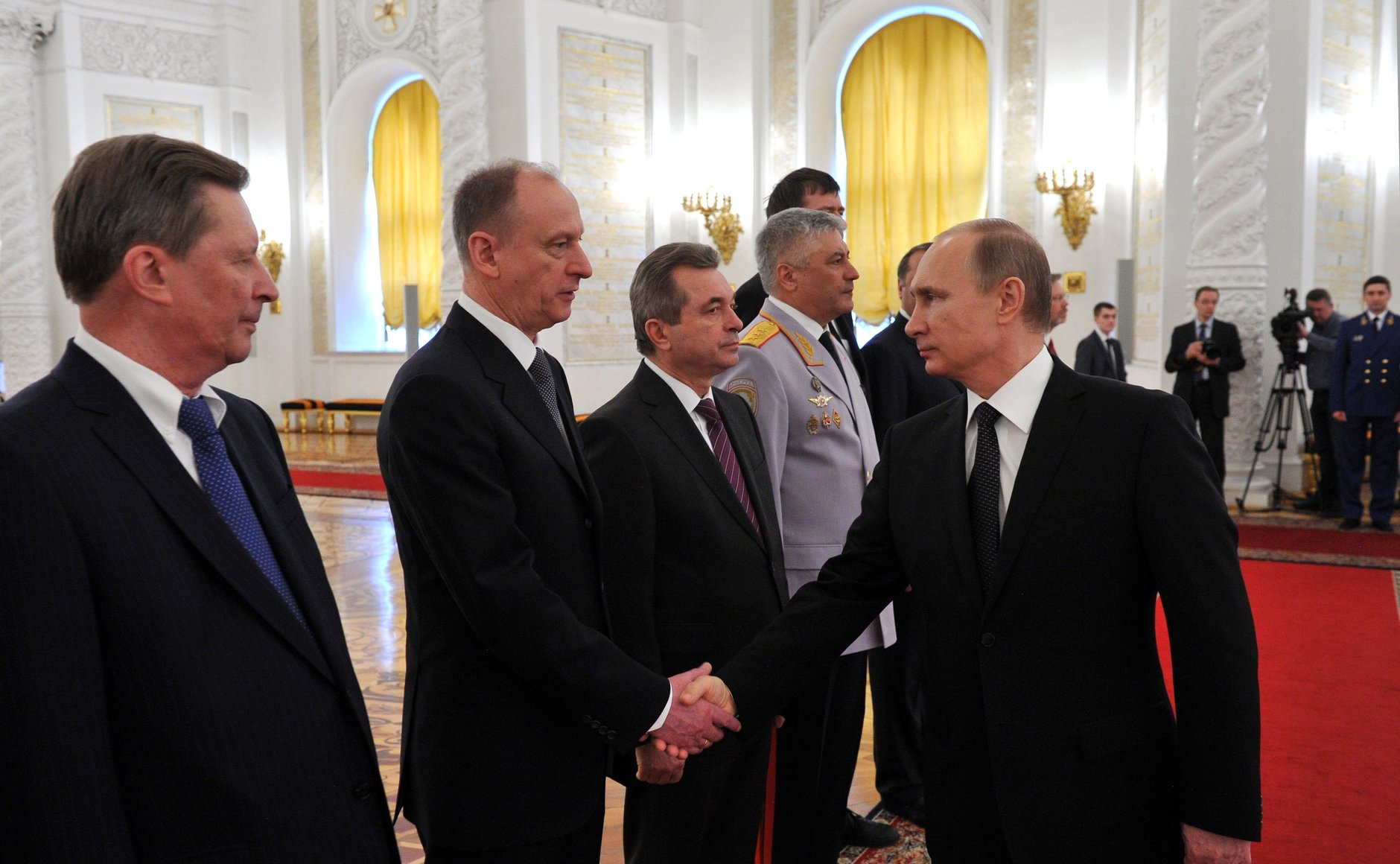
Nikolai Patrushev (second left) and Sergei Ivanov with Putin, 8 April 2015

A sociological investigation unveiling the phenomena was done in 2004 by Olga Kryshtanovskaya, who determined the proportion of siloviks in the Russian political elite to be 25%. In Putin's "inner circle" which constitutes about 20 people, the amount of siloviks rises to 58%, and fades to 18–20% in Parliament and 34% in the Government. According to Kryshtanovskaya, there was no capture of power as Kremlin bureaucracy has called siloviks in order to "restore order". The process of siloviks coming into power allegedly started in 1996, Boris Yeltsin's second term. "Not personally Yeltsin, but the whole elite wished to stop the revolutionary process and consolidate power."

When silovik Vladimir Putin was appointed prime minister in 1999, the process was boosted. According to Kryshtanovskaya, "Yes, Putin has brought siloviks with him. But that's not enough to understand the situation. Here's also an objective aspect: the whole political class wished them to come. They were called for service... There was a need of a strong arm, capable from point of view of the elite to establish order in the country."

Kryshtanovskaya has also noted that there were people who had worked in structures "affiliated" with the KGB/FSB. Structures usually considered as such are the Soviet Ministry of Foreign Affairs, Governmental Communications Commission, Ministry of Foreign Trade, Press Agency News and others. "The itself work in such agencies doesn't involve necessary contacts with special services, but makes you think about it." Summing up numbers of official and "affiliated" siloviks she got an estimate of 77% of such in the power.

Putin's chief national security adviser, Nikolai Patrushev, who believed that the West has been in an undeclared war with Russia for years, was a leading figure behind Russia's updated national security strategy, published in May 2021. It stated that Russia may use "forceful methods" to "thwart or avert unfriendly actions that threaten the sovereignty and territorial integrity of the Russian Federation".

=== 2020 amendments to the Russian Constitution ===
Following a referendum, with Putin's signing an executive order on 3 July 2020 to officially insert the amendments into the Russian Constitution, they took effect on 4 July 2020. Vladimir Pastukhov, a Russian political scientist, advocate and honorary senior research associate of the University College London's School of Slavonic and East European Studies, and Alexander Podrabinek, a Soviet dissident, journalist and Russian human rights defender, state that Russia has been taking on the characteristics of a totalitarianism as a result of the constitutional amendments. This is reflected in incremental but steady and aggressive process of the seizing of full control over public and private life, and de facto criminalization of any opposition and dissidence.

== Classification of administration ==
=== Intelligence state ===
According to former Securitate general Ion Mihai Pacepa, "In the Soviet Union, the KGB was a state within a state. Now former KGB officers are running the state. They have custody of the country's 6,000 nuclear weapons, entrusted to the KGB in the 1950s, and they now also manage the strategic oil industry renationalized by Putin. The KGB successor, rechristened FSB, still has the right to electronically monitor the population, control political groups, search homes and businesses, infiltrate the federal government, create its own front enterprises, investigate cases, and run its own prison system. The Soviet Union had one KGB officer for every 428 citizens. Putin's Russia has one FSB-ist for every 297 citizens."

"Under Russian Federation President and former career foreign intelligence officer Vladimir Putin, an "FSB State" composed of chekists has been established and is consolidating its hold on the country. Its closest partners are organized criminals. In a world marked by a globalized economy and information infrastructure, and with transnational terrorism groups utilizing all available means to achieve their goals and further their interests, Russian intelligence collaboration with these elements is potentially disastrous", said politologist Julie Anderson.

Former KGB officer Konstantin Preobrazhenskiy shares similar ideas. When asked "How many people in Russia work in FSB?", he replied: "Whole country. FSB owns everything, including Russian Army and even own Church, the Russian Orthodox Church... Putin managed to create new social system in Russia".

"Vladimir Putin's Russia is a new phenomenon in Europe: a state defined and dominated by former and active-duty security and intelligence officers. Not even fascist Italy, Nazi Germany, or the Soviet Union – all undoubtedly much worse creations than Russia – were as top-heavy with intelligence talent", said intelligence expert Reuel Marc Gerecht.

=== Corporation-state ===
Andrei Illarionov considers the political system in Russia as a variety of corporatism. According to Illarionov, a former advisor of Vladimir Putin, this is a new socio-political order, "distinct from any seen in our country before". He said that members of the Corporation of Intelligence Service Collaborators took over the entire body of state power, follow an omerta-like behavior code, and "are given instruments conferring power over others – membership "perks", such as the right to carry and use weapons".

According to Illarionov, this "Corporation has seized key government agencies – the Tax Service, Ministry of Defense, Ministry of Foreign Affairs, Parliament, and the government-controlled mass media – which are now used to advance the interests of [Corporation] members. Through these agencies, every significant resource of the country – security/intelligence, political, economic, informational and financial – is being monopolized in the hands of Corporation members".

Members of the Corporation created an isolated caste. A former KGB general said that "a Chekist is a breed... A good KGB heritage—a father or grandfather, say, who worked for the service—is highly valued by today's siloviki. Marriages between siloviki clans are also encouraged."

=== Single-party bureaucratic state ===
Russian politician Boris Nemtsov and activist Vladimir Kara-Murza defined Putinism in 2004 as "a one party system, censorship, a puppet parliament, ending of an independent judiciary, firm centralization of power and finances, and hypertrophied role of special services and bureaucracy, in particular in relation to business".

=== State gangsterism ===
Political analyst Andrei Piontkovsky considers Putinism as "the highest and culminating stage of bandit capitalism in Russia". He believes that "Russia is not corrupt. Corruption is what happens in all countries when businessmen offer officials large bribes for favors. Today's Russia is unique. The businessmen, the politicians, and the bureaucrats are the same people. They have privatized the country's wealth and taken control of its financial flows." Russian-American journalist Masha Gessen has also described Russia as a "mafia state".

Such views are shared by politologist Julie Anderson who said the same person can be a Russian intelligence officer, an organized criminal, and a businessman. She also cited former CIA director James Woolsey who said: "I have been particularly concerned for some years, beginning during my tenure, with the interpenetration of Russian organized crime, Russian intelligence and law enforcement, and Russian business. I have often illustrated this point with the following hypothetical: If you should chance to strike up a conversation with an articulate, English-speaking Russian in, say, the restaurant of one of the luxury hotels along Lake Geneva, and he is wearing a $3,000 suit and a pair of Gucci loafers, and he tells you that he is an executive of a Russian trading company and wants to talk to you about a joint venture, then there are four possibilities. He may be what he says he is. He may be a Russian intelligence officer working under commercial cover. He may be part of a Russian organized crime group. But the really interesting possibility is that he may be all three and that none of those three institutions have any problem with the arrangement."

According to political analyst Dmitri Glinski, "The idea of Russia, Inc.--or better, Russia, Ltd.--derives from the Russian brand of libertarian anarchism viewing the state as just another private armed gang claiming special rights on the basis of its unusual power." "This is a state conceived as a "stationary bandit" imposing stability by eliminating the roving bandits of the previous era." In April 2006, the effective privatization of the customs sphere infuriated Putin himself, where businessmen and officials "merged in ecstasy".

== Ideology ==
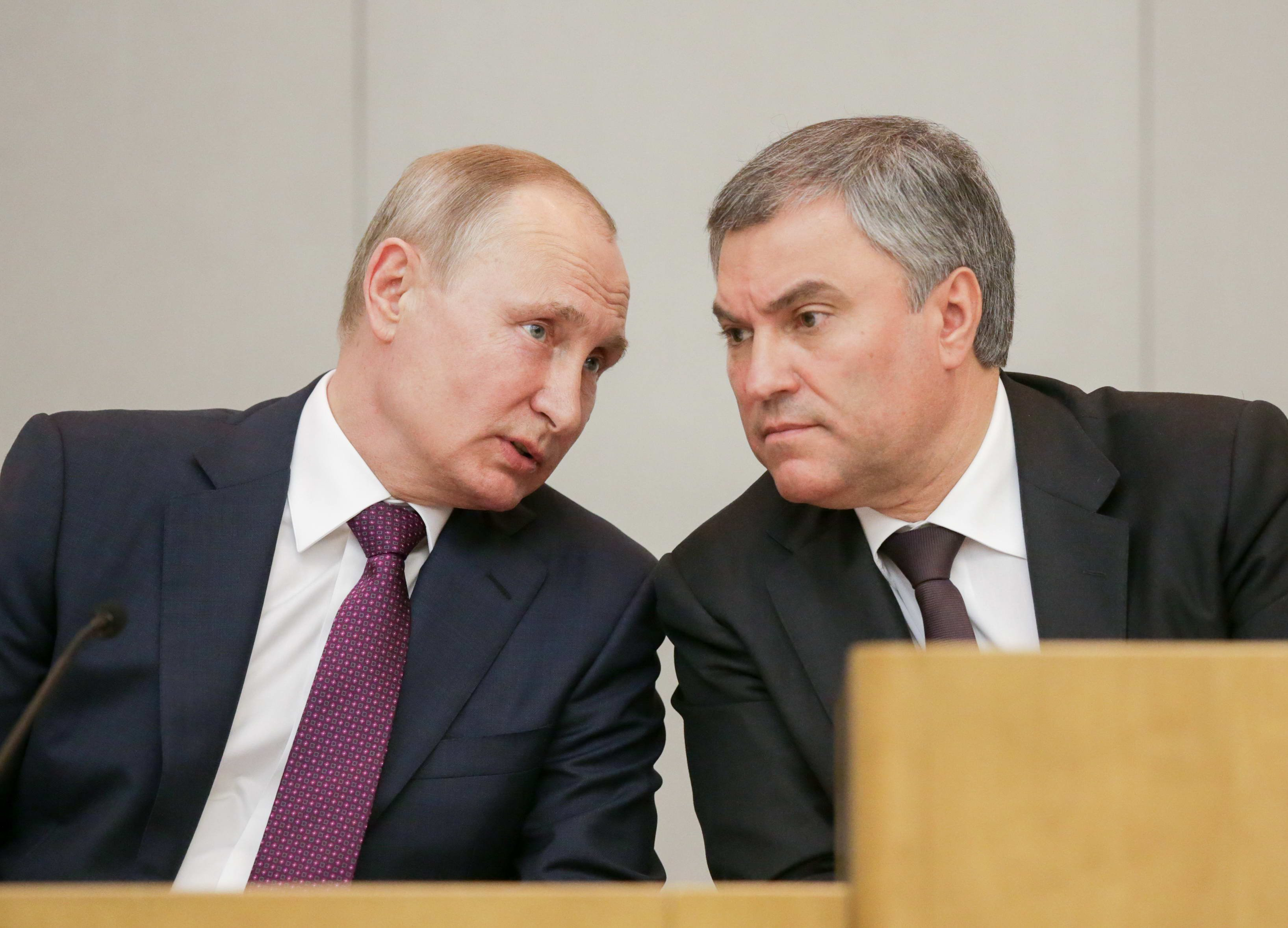
Putin's deputy chief of staff, Vyacheslav Volodin, stated in 2014, "If there is Putin, there is Russia. If there is no Putin, there is no Russia!"

Analysts have described Russia's state ideology under Putin as nationalist and neo-imperialist. Andrey Kolesnikov describes Putin's regime since his third term as melding nationalist imperialism with conservative Orthodoxy and authoritarian aspects of Stalinism.

Politologist Irina Pavlova said that Chekists are not merely a corporation of people united to expropriate financial assets. They have long-standing political objectives of transforming Moscow into the Third Rome and anti-American ideology of containing the United States. Columnist George Will emphasized the nationalistic nature of Putinism. He said that "Putinism is becoming a toxic brew of nationalism directed against neighboring nations, and populist envy, backed by assaults of state power, directed against private wealth. Putinism is national socialism without the demonic element of its pioneer ...". According to Illarionov, the ideology of chekists is Nashism ("ours-ism"), the selective application of rights".

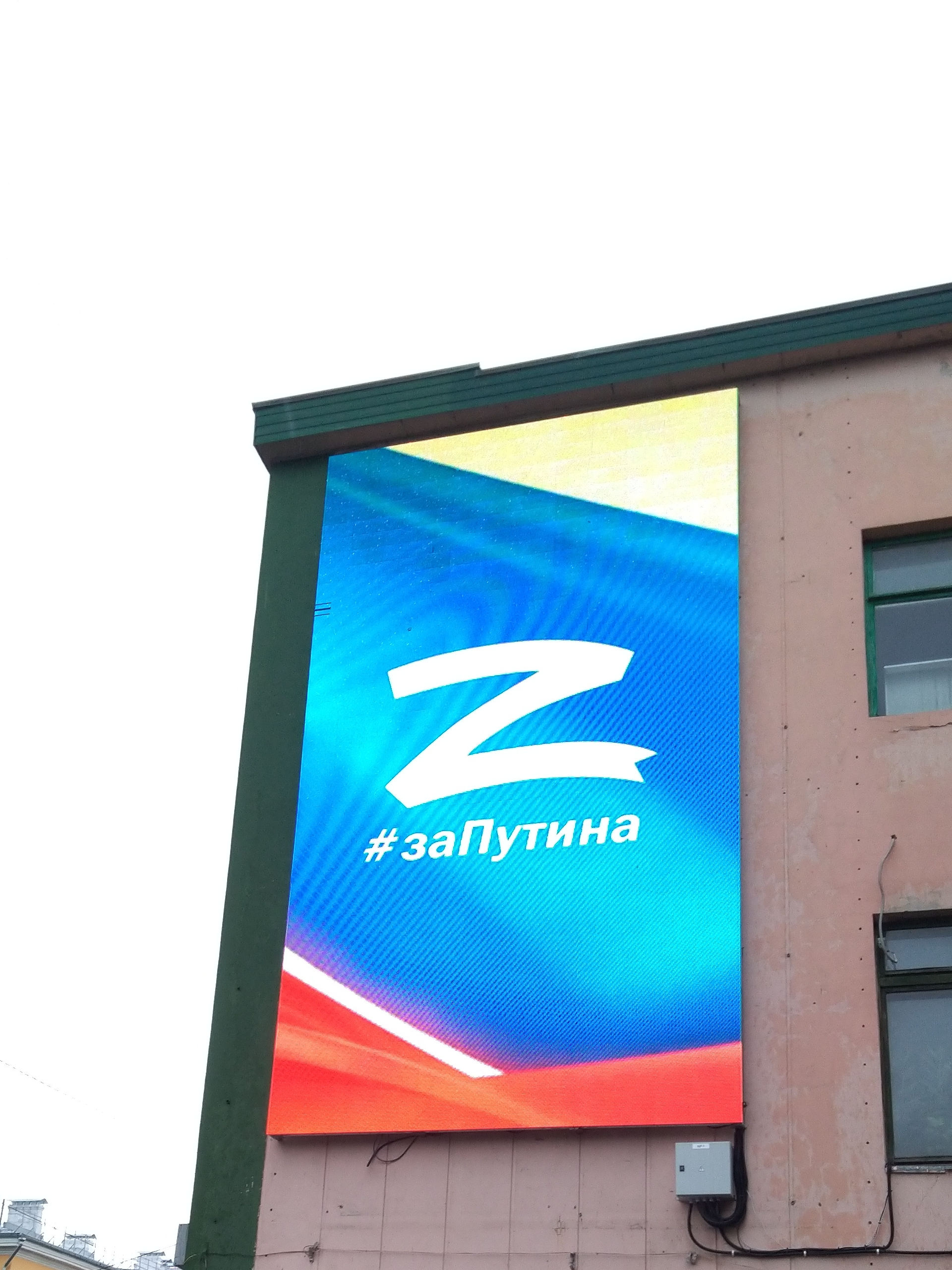
Z symbol on a billboard in Ryazan with the hashtag #заПутина (lit. '#forPutin')

In February 2021, Putin linked his own personal thought and ideology to that of Lev Gumilyov, stating that he too believed in 'passionarity', the rise and fall of societies as described by this theory and specifically that Russia was a nation 'has not yet attained its highest point', with an 'infinite genetic code'.

According to Michael Hirsh, a senior correspondent at Foreign Policy:

Graham and other Russia experts said it is a mistake to view Putin merely as an angry former KGB apparatchik upset at the fall of the Soviet Union and NATO's encroachment after the Cold War, as he is often portrayed by Western commentators. Putin, himself, made this clear in his Feb. 21 speech, when he disavowed the Soviet legacy, inveighing against the mistakes made by former leaders Vladimir Lenin and Joseph Stalin to grant Ukraine even partial autonomy. ... Putin is rather a messianic Russian nationalist and Eurasianist whose constant invocation of history going back to Kievan Rus, however specious, is the best explanation for his view that Ukraine must be part of Russia's sphere of influence, experts say. In his essay last July, Putin even suggested that the formation of a separate, democratic Ukrainian nation "is comparable in its consequences to the use of weapons of mass destruction against us."

=== Illiberalism ===
Such authors as Marlene Laruelle define Putinism as one of the cases of illiberalism, an "ideological universe" which would become represented by such figures as Donald Trump (Trumpism) in the US amd Viktor Orban (Orbanism) in Hungary. Illiberalism is a backlash against contemporary global liberalism, political and cultural above all, and progressivism; illiberalism opposes them from the standpoint of majoritarian nation-state and authoritarian principles to establish a national cultural homogeneous community. Other elements have been victimization of nation and concentration of power within the figure of a charismatic 'Caesarist' or personalist leader who represents the 'authentic' national community to be restored, assertion of national sovereignty and of "national interests" over international norms. All these have been applied to Putinism. Laruelle notes that while Putinists never used the term illiberal like Orban did, the latter's concept of illiberal is similar to the one of "Sovereign democracy" propagated by Putin's ideologue Vladislav Surkov.

Laruelle believes that "Russia has been an incredibly productive ideological laboratory for illiberal ideas since the 1990s, for several reasons linked to the collapse of the Soviet Union" and a "precursor" to the current Western (and not only) illiberal movements. She says that for the Western European rightists, Russia and later Hungary were the successful models of illiberalism they could base their platforms on.

=== Anti-Americanism ===
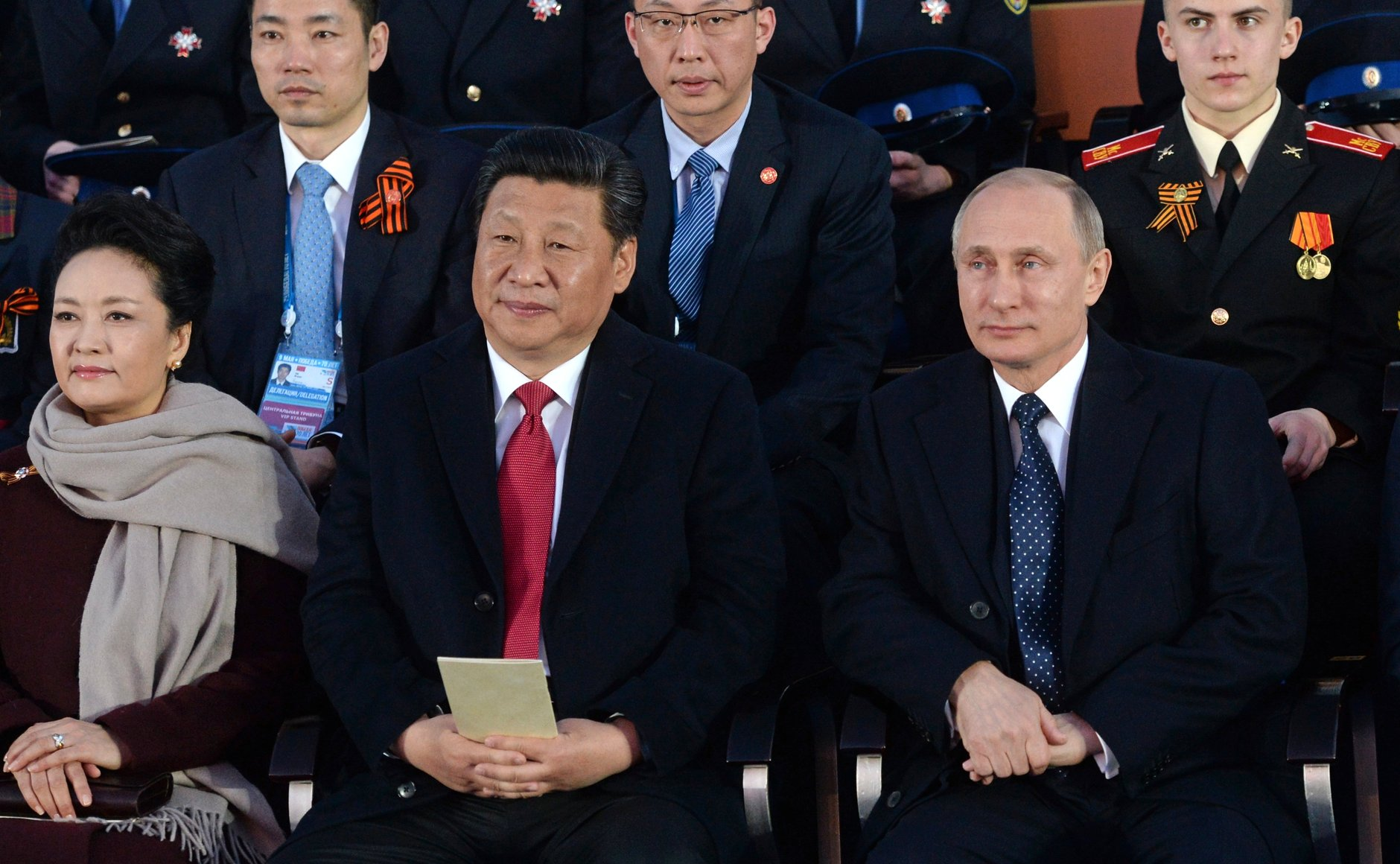
Putin with Chinese leader Xi Jinping during Xi's state visit to Moscow, May 2015

In response to the growing anti-Americanism after the Russo-Georgian War in the Russian intellectual-political class, the director of the Institute of Globalization and Social Movements, Boris Kagarlitsky, said, "Ironically, one of the dominant trends here is that we are anti-American because we want to be exactly like America. We are angry that Americans are allowed to invade minor nations and we are not." In recent Russian polls, the United States and its allies have consistently topped the list of Russia's greatest enemies. However, survey results published by the Levada-Center indicate that, as of August 2018, Russians increasingly viewed the United States positively following the Russia–U.S. summit in Helsinki in July 2018. According to the Pew Research Center, "57% of Russians ages 18 to 29 see the U.S. favorably, compared with only 15% of Russians ages 50 and older."

According to Moscow Carnegie Center Director Dmitri Trenin, anti-Americanism in Russia is becoming the basis for official patriotism. Further researcher states that the Russian ruling elite have stopped pretending that it follows the West and cherishes its declared values. Now, Moscow openly states that its values are not completely common with modern Western values in such fields as democracy, human rights, national sovereignty, role of government, the church, and the nature of family. Putin's Russia has formed alliances with anti-American regimes in non-Western countries such as China and Iran. According to some Russian experts, anti-American sentiments are driven largely by domestic political climate and has little relationship to US foreign policy.

=== Putinism and fascism ===
==== Arguments against calling Putinism fascism ====
In 2022, Radio Free Europe/Radio Liberty took an interview from experts on fascism who responded that Putin's Russia is not fascist. Although they note the existence of some similarities between Putinism and fascism, such as revanchism and "hypermasculine authority", they argue that Putin's Russia lacks the mass mobilization and the revolutionary nationalism which were fundamental characteristics of fascist movements. Additionally, they said that it doesn't seek "transcendence" to create a "new man" like fascist movements did. Instead, Putin's Russia has been generally described as reactionary and authoritarian conservative. Oxford historian Roger Griffin who belongs to the "new consensus" direction of fascism studies (see details on Fascism#Definitions) compared Putin's Russia to World War II-era Japan, saying that like Putin's Russia, it "emulated fascism in many ways, but it was not fascist"; he said that Putin as a reactionary wants "to recreate a modified version of the Soviet Union" as opposed to a "revolutionary" "new order" and a new system and works similarly to Viktor Orban's 'illiberal' Hungary. American historian Stanley G. Payne, also a "new consensus" representative, argued that Putin's political system is "more a revival of the creed of Tsar Nicholas I in the 19th century that emphasized 'Orthodoxy, autocracy, and nationality' than one resembling the revolutionary, modernizing regimes of Hitler and Mussolini", though he admitted that Russia "forms the nearest analogue to fascism found in a major country since that time."

He argued that fascist regimes, imbued with revolutionary ideas and seeking to implement changes which would push society into a new order, relied on the mobilization of the masses of the population and their active participation in politics in order to implement these changes. Putinism, on the other hand, is counter-revolutionary, it strictly opposes any social reforms and social mobilization and it aims to de-politicize society, which it sees as a threat to its existence. The mass social involvement of the population is discouraged, the exercise of politics is reduced to "pure management" which is left to those who are in power, free from the interference of the masses. In exchange for the population's non-involvement in politics, Putinism's social contract offers economic development and an important amount of freedom in private life, "bread and entertainment". According to Sheri Berman, Hitler and Mussolini both came to power through a "very large mass movement" and in front of people, their images as the leaders of the masses and their images as leaders who felt "a sort of direct connection to them stuck in the minds of the people", while Putin's regime "is not a mass regime that came to power or operates on the basis of mass mobilization", on the contrary, Putin "came up as an apparatchik" and has not built "a dynamic and charismatic movement in the fascist style", preferring to see his people de-mobilized and usually best remembered "sitting alone at the end of the table".

==== Arguments in favour ====
On the other hand, Russia has been increasingly called fascist since 2014 and especially since 2022.

The historians Timothy Snyder and Alexander J. Motyl were among the first major voices to do so in the 2010s. Snyder and other authors note that during speeches which he has made on various occasions, Vladimir Putin has quoted the fascist ultranationalist white émigré Russian philosopher Ivan Ilyin, who is a major ideological inspiration for him, according to some observers. Aleksandr Dugin, a formerly marginal contemporary apologist for Eurasianism and conservative revolution, whose views are close to Fascism, has become a semi-official philosopher of the Putin regime and headed 2023 establishment the Ivan Ilyin Higher School of Politics at the Russian State University for the Humanities. Russian journalist Andrei Malgin compared Putin's desire to restore a "lost" empire and his support for the church and "traditional values" to the policies of Italian fascist leader Benito Mussolini. Russian political scientist Andrey Piontkovsky argues that the ideology of Rashism is in many ways similar to German fascism (Nazism), while the speeches of President Vladimir Putin reflect similar ideas to those of Adolf Hitler. Van Herpen compares in detail what he considers as similarities between Putin's regime and that of Weimar Germany and Mussolini's Italy, indicating the presence of strong fascist elements in Putin's Russia. However, he argues that these elements are tempered by other elements that show a resemblance with the Bonapartism from Napoleon III's France and the post-modern populism of Silvio Berlusconi, creating a hybrid system which he calls 'Fascism-lite'. According to Van Herpen, although 'Putinism' has a softer face than Mussolinian Fascism, it still contains a hard core of ultra-nationalism, militarism, and neo-imperialism.

In 2010, Peter Sucia, an American historian and a contributor to The National Interest, was one of the first publicists to explicitly describe Putin as a leader who is sincerely convinced that his fascist values are righteous. Sucia wrote: "Some historians and economists have noted that fascism is actually an anti-Marxist form of socialism, especially as it favors class collaboration and supports the concept of nationalism — the latter being something that Marxists could never support. A diehard Marxist leader wouldn't get on a plane and fly halfway around the world to try and win support for the Olympics to be hosted in his country, even his hometown. But a tried and true Fascist might do so."

After 2022, the trend to define Putinism as a contemporary form of fascism has grown, with the invasion of Ukraine alalyzed through fascistic or fascist objectives. The historian Jason Stanley said that Russia was the "closest state to fascism since Nazi Germany and Italy... in Russia, it is even tougher than in Italy, with all this Russian ultranationalism. Fascist parties and movements exist always and everywhere. The question is whether the government creates the conditions for them to have a decisive influence. Putin succeeded." Snyder in materials after 2022 other than citing Ilyin and describing aggressive authoritarian imperial nationalism also added the "cult of unreason", through which Putin and his propaganda apply the category of fascism to his enemies:

Fascists calling other people ‘fascists’ is fascism taken to its illogical extreme as a cult of unreason. It is a final point where hate speech inverts reality and propaganda is pure insistence. It is the apogee of will over thought. Calling others fascists while being a fascist is the essential Putinist practice... I have called it 'schizo-fascism.' Ukrainians simply call it 'Ruscism.'

The line of certain authors is based on linking the contemporary 'illiberal' movements to fascism. Stanley compared Putin's rhetoric to the one of Viktor Orban who installed an authoritarian regime in Hungary; he analyzed Putin's rhetoric as appealing to the perceived national humiliation that has to be avenged through the restoration of greatness; such rhetoric finds success in economically devastated countries like Germany after World War I or Russia after the 1990s. He said that Putin was "closer to Hitler than to Brezhnev", comparing Putin's rhetoric on Ukrainians to the one of Hitler on Jews, "the only difference is that for the Germans, everything was based on race, while the basis of Russian fascism is language and culture. And now we know that linguistic and cultural nationalism can also lead to genocide." The historian Ruth Ben-Ghiat calls Snyder's arguments regarding Putin published in 2022 convincing and here connects Putinism to Trumpism in the US and Orbanism in Hungary, citing Robert O. Paxton, whose approach led to him labelling Trumpism fascist. Paxton gave a more simple definition of fascism than Griffin, as above all "obsessive preoccupation with community decline," "humiliation, or victimhood," and "cults of unity combined with violence, ethnic cleansing, destruction and national rebirth, energy, and purity" driven by "nationalist militants" working with traditional elites using "redemptive violence and without ethical or legal restraints towards the goals of internal cleansing and external expansion." Ben-Ghiat writes that contemporary 'fascism' works differently, in the West bases itself in electoral democratic systems and "Fascism could now become "post-fascism," as Fini called it." The term post-fascism is used by the historian Enzo Traverso, who in his book The New Faces of Fascism defined post-fascism as a global phenomenon "simultaneously similar to and different from classical fascism of the twentieth century": post-fascism in the cases of Putin and Bolsonaro is similar in its mobilization around "nationalism, authoritarianism, and a specific idea of “national regeneration”", but different in lacking the "utopian" dimension of fascism shaped by the industrial age and revolutionary communism and grows on neoliberal capitalism, presenting a conservative reaction to liberalism.

Other authors, however, cite not only Paxton with his approach, but also Griffin insisting on the 'revolutionary' dimension of fascism. Both Griffin and Paxton make an emphasis on fascism striving for war as the "rebirth" of the nation through violent purification of the self and the "Other." Authors led by Ian Garner and Taras Kuzio wrote in a collection in a series edited by Andreas Umland cited both Paxton and Griffin's palingenetic ultranationalism in their analysis of Putinism. According to them, the invasion of Ukraine was a decisive point in the fascization of Putinism which presented it as the beginning of the "revolutionary transformation" of Russia and the world, with it playing the role Griffin and Paxton gave it: it marks the restoration of the greatness of the Russian state, the cleansing of 'anti-national' elements, and the decaying liberal world order becoming replaced with "multipolar world." They also note that Putinism as the 21st century movement is defined by TV and online communications. Similarly to how "European fascists in the twenty-first century turn to simulacra and digital platforms to spread the idea that they defend Europe's true Christian civilisation by ‘shaping the chaotic mass with force, awakening people to a historic mission, stopping multiculturalism and violently annihilating the foreign within," Putinism prefers TV and the internet to create a feeling of connection between its atomized masses.

=== Putinism and Russian ethnic nationalism ===
Professing its own vision of Russian nationalism, primarily based on a predominantly civil understanding of Russian national identity, Putinism has been challenged by the alternative form of Russian nationalism based on ethnic roots. Ethnic nationalists are critical of Putin's immigration policy, which allows migration of millions of people from post-Soviet Central Asia and Caucasus to Russia's traditionally Slavic heartland. Highlighting his stance on "Russia for Russians" slogan in a 2003 television broadcast, Putin said the people who act upon such slogan are "either idiots or provocateurs" who want to weaken the Russian Federation, which he framed as multi-ethnic and multi-cultural country. The law against "extremism" being adopted in 2002 has resulted in closures of many prominent nationalist organizations in Russia, including the Movement Against Illegal Immigration and the Slavic Union.

According to Robert Horvath of La Trobe University, during the 1990s, when Russia saw waves of racist violence and Putin became president in 2000, his regime exploited this threat to introduce anti-extremism legislation that was also used to target pro-democracy and left-wing activists. The Kremlin's "managed nationalism" would "co-opt and mobilise radical nationalist militants" to fight against the opposition. Afterward, the violent radical nationalists got jailed while others flourished to promote pro-Putin Russian nationalism. On 25 December 2022, in a TV interview, Putin, apparently for the first time, openly declared that Russia's goal—territorially "to unite the Russian people" (the Russians as ethnic group).

=== Putinism and the Western far-right ===
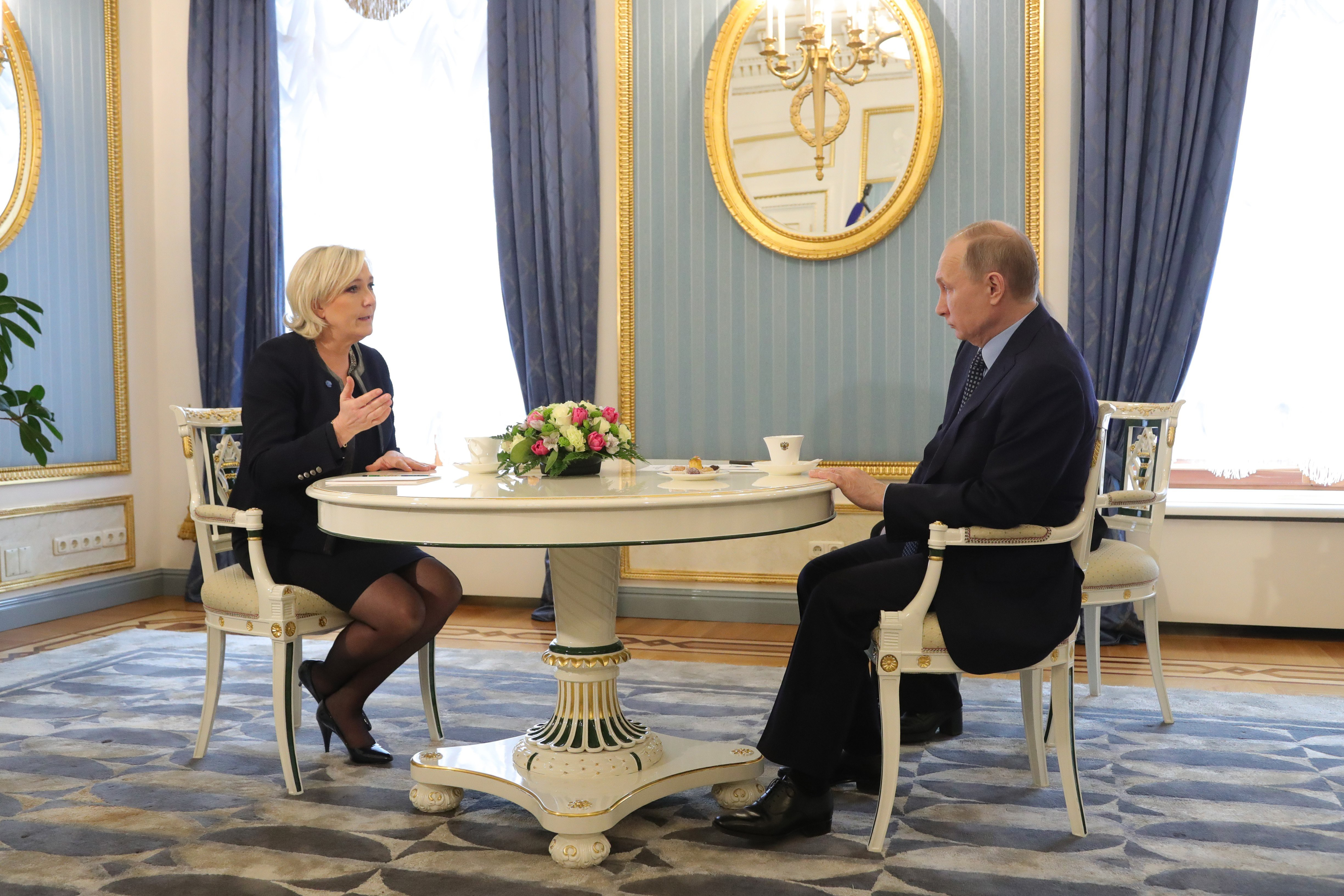
Putin and Marine Le Pen in Moscow, 24 March 2017

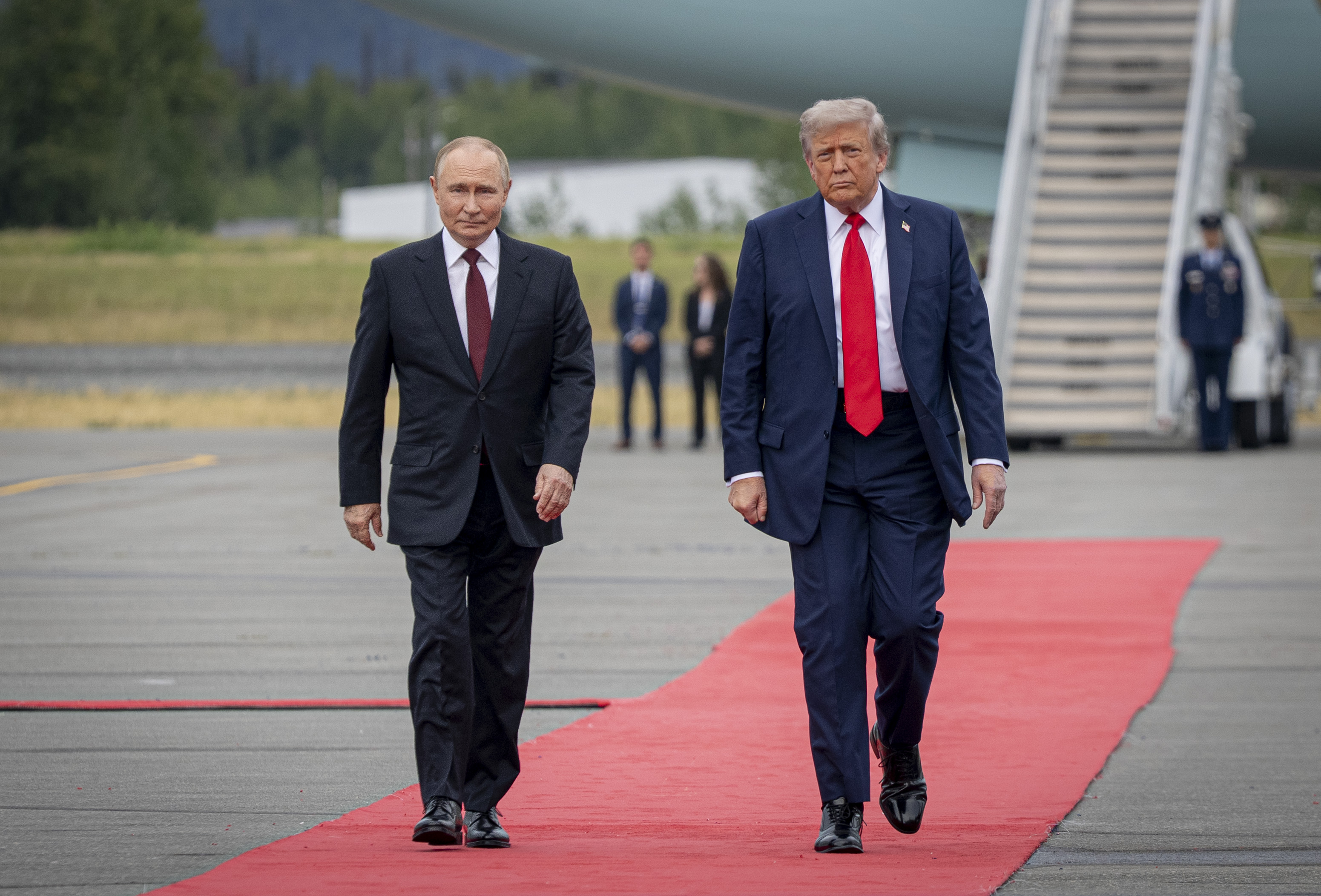
Putin and Donald Trump in Alaska, 15 August 2025

A number of far-right politicians and parties in the European Union have been linked with Putin, including Marine Le Pen, Matteo Salvini, and parts of the Alternative for Germany. Putinism has also received support from a number of American far-right figures. Some populists started to distance themselves from Putin after the Russian invasion of Ukraine.

Richard Shorten of the University of Birmingham has stated that Putin "has been appealing, not just for extreme 'manosphere' white supremacists, but also for more 'mainstream' western reactionaries attracted by an unapologetic social conservatism." Jason Stanley of Yale University argued that Putin was "the leader of Russian Christian nationalism" and "has come to view himself as the global leader of Christian nationalism, and is increasingly regarded as such by Christian nationalists around the world."

== Relation to communism ==
=== Putinism and communism ===
In December 2018, Putin said that "restoration of socialism in Russia is impossible", but stressed that "certain elements of socialization of economy and social sphere are possible". He stated that the restoration of socialism "is always related to expenditures and, eventually, an economic dead end".

In October 2021, while criticizing the modern "Western agenda", he likened it to that of the Bolsheviks for being based on the advocacy of the "so-called social progress". He criticized the Bolshevik efforts, based on "dogmas of Marx and Engels", to change not just political and economic customs, but also "the very notion of human morality and the foundations of a healthy society". He criticized the Bolsheviks for masquerading as "progress" the "destruction of age-old values, religion and relations between people, up to and including the total rejection of family, encouragement to inform on loved ones", and said that these patterns were repeated in the modern West. He also said: "In a number of Western countries, the debate over men's and women's rights has turned into a perfect phantasmagoria. Look, beware of going where the Bolsheviks once planned to go – not only communalising chickens, but also communalising women. One more step and you will be there" (see Glass of water theory).

Putin's "on conducting a special military operation" speech has been seen as anti-Bolshevik, in particular for his denunciation of Leninist principles regarding national policy. However, in his interview to the TV Rain, Russian political scientist Vladimir Pastukhov argued that Putin's regime is based on what he called Russian understanding of communism, what he considered as clinging to Soviet tradition and eclectically uniting Russian nationalist and left-wing ideas, saying that its "missionary ideology of world domination" draws on the Marxist concept of world revolution, even likening Putinism to Trotskyism in this regard.

=== Characterization of Putinism as neo-Stalinism ===
In May 2000, The Guardian wrote: "When a band of former Soviet dissidents declared in February that Putinism was nothing short of modernised Stalinism, they were widely dismissed as hysterical prophets of doom. 'Authoritarianism is growing harsher, society is being militarised, the military budget is increasing,' they warned, before calling on the West to 're-examine its attitude towards the Kremlin leadership, to cease indulging it in its barbaric actions, its dismantlement of democracy and suppression of human rights.' In the light of Putin's actions during his first days in power, their warnings have gained an uneasy new resonance".

In February 2007, Arnold Beichman, a conservative research fellow at the Hoover Institution, wrote in The Washington Times that "Putinism in the 21st century has become as significant a watchword as Stalinism was in the 20th". Also in 2007, Lionel Beehner, formerly a senior writer for the Council on Foreign Relations, maintained that on Putin's watch nostalgia for Stalin had grown even among young Russians and Russians' neo-Stalinism manifesting itself in several ways.

In February 2007, responding to a listener's assertion that "Putin had steered the country to Stalinism" and "all entrepreneurs" were being jailed in Russia, the Russian opposition radio host Yevgeniya Albats said: "Come on, this is not true; there is no Stalinism, no concentration camps—thankfully". She went on to say that if citizens of the country would not be critical of what was occurring around them, referring to the "orchestrated, or genuine" calls for the "tsar to stay on", that "could blaze the trail for very ugly things and a very tough regime in our country".

=== Putinism and neo-Sovietism ===
Neo-Sovietism, sometimes known as neo-Bolshevism, is the Soviet Union-style of policy decisions in some post-Soviet states, as well as a political movement of reviving the Soviet Union in the modern world or to reviving specific aspects of Soviet life based on the nostalgia for the Soviet Union. Some commentators have said that current Russian President Vladimir Putin holds many neo-Soviet views, especially concerning law and order and military strategic defense. According to Pamela Druckerman of The New York Times, an element of neo-Sovietism is that "the government manages civil society, political life and the media".

The first politically controversial step made by Putin, then the FSB Director, was restoring in June 1999 a memorial plaque to former Soviet leader and KGB director Yuri Andropov on the facade of the building, where the KGB had been headquartered.

In late 2000, Putin submitted a bill to the State Duma to use the Soviet national anthem as the new Russian national anthem. The Duma voted in favor. The music remained identical, but new lyrics were written by the same author who wrote the Soviet lyrics.

In September 2003, Putin was quoted as saying: "The Soviet Union is a very complicated page in the history of our peoples. It was heroic and constructive, and it was also tragic. But it is a page that has been turned. It's over, the boat has sailed. Now we need to think about the present and the future of our peoples".

In February 2004, Putin said: "It is my deep conviction that the dissolution of the Soviet Union was a national tragedy on a massive scale. I think the ordinary citizens of the former Soviet Union and the citizens in the post-Soviet space, the CIS countries, have gained nothing from it. On the contrary, people have been faced with a host of problems." He went on to say, "Incidentally, at that period, too, opinions varied, including among the leaders of the Union republics. For example, Nursultan Nazarbayev was categorically opposed to the dissolution of the Soviet Union and he said so openly proposing various formulas for preserving the state within the common borders. But, I repeat, all that is in the past. Today we should look at the situation in which we live. One cannot keep looking back and fretting about it: we should look forward".

In April 2005, during his formal address to Russia's Parliament, President Putin said: "Above all, we should acknowledge that the collapse of the Soviet Union was a major geopolitical disaster of the century. As for the Russian nation, it became a genuine drama. Tens of millions of our co-citizens and compatriots found themselves outside Russian territory. Moreover, the epidemic of disintegration infected Russia itself".

In December 2007, Putin said in the interview to the Time magazine: "Russia is an ancient country with historical, profound traditions and a very powerful moral foundation. And this foundation is a love for the Motherland and patriotism. Patriotism in the best sense of that word. Incidentally, I think that to a certain extent, to a significant extent, this is also attributable to the American people".

In August 2008, The Economist claimed: "Russia today is ruled by the KGB elite, has a Soviet anthem, servile media, corrupt courts and a rubber-stamping parliament. A new history textbook proclaims that the Soviet Union, although not a democracy, was 'an example for millions of people around the world of the best and fairest society'".

In November 2008, International Herald Tribune stated:

The Kremlin in the Putin era has often sought to maintain as much sway over the portrayal of history as over the governance of the country. In seeking to restore Russia's standing, Putin and other officials have stoked a nationalism that glorifies Soviet triumphs while playing down or even whitewashing the system's horrors. As a result, throughout Russia, many archives detailing killings, persecution and other such acts committed by the Soviet authorities have become increasingly off-limits. The role of the security services seems especially delicate, perhaps because Putin is a former KGB agent who headed the agency's successor, the FSB, in the late 1990s.

Putin has an amicable relationship with Gennady Zyuganov, the leader of Communist Party of the Russian Federation (KPRF). Roger Boyes considers Putin more of a latter-day Leonid Brezhnev than a clone of Stalin. In August 2014, he rejected Vladimir Zhirinovsky's proposal to return the Imperial flag and anthem. On 30 October 2017, Putin opened the Wall of Grief, the first Russian memorial dedicated to the victims of Stalinist repressions. It was seen as a gesture towards the Russian intelligentsia.

=== Putinism and the Western left ===
Some hardline Western socialists have been seen as supporting Putin during the war in Ukraine. According to the National Post, as after the collapse of the Soviet Union no socialist state has managed to fully replace it as a socialist rallying point, many hardliners adopted a negative approach to politics defined by the opposition to the United States. Identifying America as the "imperialist core", they have supported the anti-American regimes around the globe under the slogan of "anti-imperialism", including Putin's regime in Russia. This support for Putin exacerbated in the 2010s as Russia regained the strength to challenge American hegemony and was seen as heir to the Soviet legacy, despite the fact that it had transformed into a kleptocracy. It has been also noted that these segments of the international pro-Soviet left have distaste towards the post-Soviet Eastern Europeans states which Putin's Russia has engaged in conflicts with because these countries rejected the Soviet rule as "colonial". National Post identified Canadian Green Party eco-socialist Dimitri Lascaris as one of the representatives of this "pro-Russian socialism".

Some magazine editors claimed Jean-Luc Mélenchon "supported Russia" and was sympathetic towards Vladimir Putin. Notably, the journalist Nicolas Hénin said that Mélenchon is "on the left of the political spectrum, but is an advocate for the Kremlin leader", with Hénin quoting how Mélenchon is the "political victim number one" after the murder of the Russian opposition leader Boris Nemtsov. Cécile Vaissié, author of The Kremlin Networks, considers Jean-Luc Mélenchon as "one of those that approve of Putin", and Yannick Jadot of EELV said that the "pro-Russia" stance is "contrary to any environment thinking".

Mélenchon mocked accusations of support for Putin, saying that it is unlikely that an "eco-socialist" would support Putin, and when attacked by Benoît Hamon on the topic of Putin, he stated: "I am not bound in any way to Mr. Putin. I am absolutely fighting his policy, and if I were Russian, I would not vote for his party, but for the Russian Left Front whose leader is in prison." However, Mélenchon believes Putin was legitimately elected and thus deserves appropriate respect for his position. Mélenchon declared opposition to Putin's domestic policy and notes his friend of the Russian Left Front, Sergey Udaltsov, is imprisoned in Russia.

Before Russia's invasion of Ukraine, Sahra Wagenknecht was a prominent defender of Russia and its President Vladimir Putin, arguing that while the United States were trying to "conjure up" an invasion of Ukraine, "Russia has in fact no interest in marching into Ukraine". After Russia launched a large-scale invasion of Ukraine on 24 February 2022, Wagenknecht said that her judgment had been wrong. Wagenknecht opposed sanctions against Russia over the 2022 invasion, and, in a speech in September 2022, accused the German government of "launching an unprecedented economic war against our most important energy supplier". Before the war, over half of Germany's gas was supplied by Russia. In May, The Left had voted in favor of economic sanctions against Russia. Her speech was applauded by The Left party leadership and by the far-right Alternative for Germany. Her speech prompted the resignation of two high-profile party members.

On 10 February 2023, Wagenknecht and Alice Schwarzer started collecting signatures for their Manifest für Frieden (lit. 'Manifesto for peace') on Change.org. It called for negotiations with Russia and a halt to arms deliveries to Ukraine. By the end of the month it had received 700,000 signatures. A rally for peace with Wagenknecht and Schwarzer on 25 February was also attended by far-right groups, and was said to have appealed to the Querfront.

The Slovak political party Smer holds Russophilic and Eurosceptic stances on foreign policy; however, it claims to support Slovakia's membership in the European Union and NATO. The party expresses strong anti-Western, especially anti-American sentiment, often spreading Russian propaganda narratives.

Regarding the Russo-Ukrainian War, Smer calls for an end to military aid to Ukraine as well as to sanctions against Russia. It interprets the Russian invasion of Ukraine as a proxy war between the US and Russia, with the latter "dealing with threats to its national interests". The party declares that the conflict was provoked in 2014 by "the extermination of citizens of Russian nationality by Ukrainian fascists".

== Relationship with history ==
A number of commentators have remarked on the importance of history in the views and actions of Vladimir Putin, with several stating themes of Russian irredentism and historical revisionism. Fredrik Logevall of Harvard University has stated that "In a way, I think history is what drives him." Oliver Bullough of the Institute for War and Peace Reporting has argued that Putin's "two core aims" was to restore stability and put an end to revolutions in Russia and to return Russia to a status of a great power.

=== Mongol Golden Horde ===
In his speech in November 2023, Putin stated that the Mongol-Tatar yoke resulting from the Mongol invasion of Kievan Rus' was better for the Russian people than Western domination, saying: "Alexander Nevsky received a jarlyk [permission] from the khans of the Golden Horde to rule as a prince, primarily so that he could effectively resist the invasion of the West." According to Putin, the decision to submit to the Tatar khans preserved "the Russian people - and later all the peoples living on the territory of our country."

=== Russian Empire ===
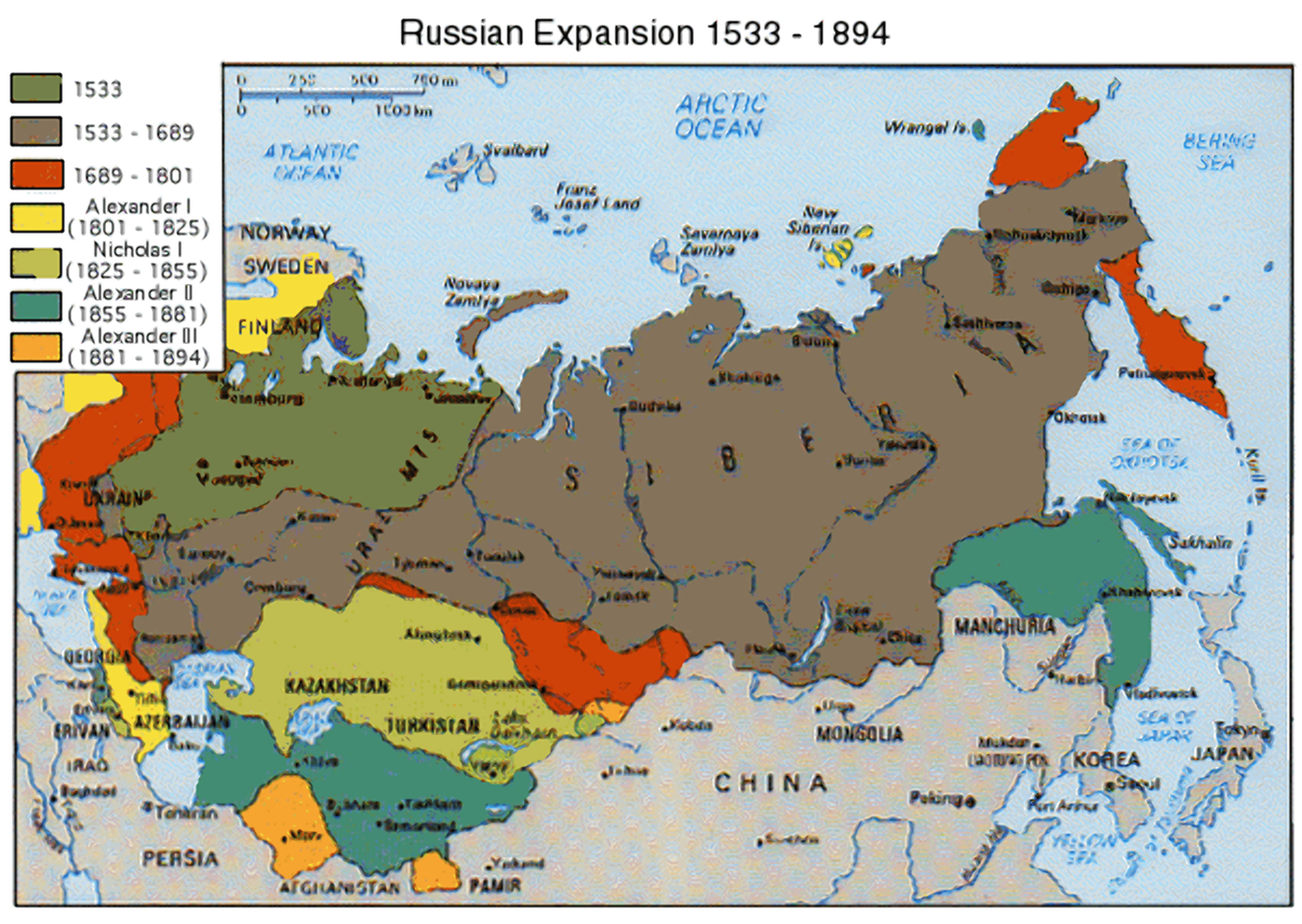
Russian expansion in Eurasia between 1533 and 1894

Some commentators have described Putin as wishing to restore the Russian Empire. James Krapfl of McGill University has suggested that Putin may be in part inspired by Catherine the Great, stating that "parallels with Putin's strategy are striking." On 9 June 2022, on the 350th anniversary of the birth of Peter the Great, Putin described the land that had been conquered by Peter in the Great Northern War against Sweden as land being returned to Russia. He also compared the task facing Russia today to that of Peter's.

Several commentators have also described Putinism as in part an attempt to revive the Russian Empire's doctrine of "Orthodoxy, Autocracy, and Nationality". Faith Hillis of the University of Chicago has argued that Putin "wants to reconstitute the Russian Empire and its guiding ideologies, which were orthodoxy, autocracy and nationality—except now, under the power of a very sophisticated police state." A 2014 paper in the Journal of Eurasian Studies compares Putin to Emperor Nicholas I, under whose reign the doctrine was instituted, arguing that "Putin has emphasized patriotism, power, and statism to justify centralization of power and authoritarian policies. Putin's policies and rhetoric are strong analogs to those of Nicholas."

=== Soviet Union ===
Richard Shorten of the University of Birmingham has stated that "what Putin retains from the Soviet era is not its utopianism but its late-period security obsession." Tom Parfitt of The Guardian has said that, according to Richard Sakwa, Putin's Soviet patriotism "had little to do with promoting communist values and more to do with besting the enemies surrounding the motherland."

=== Collapse of the Soviet Union ===
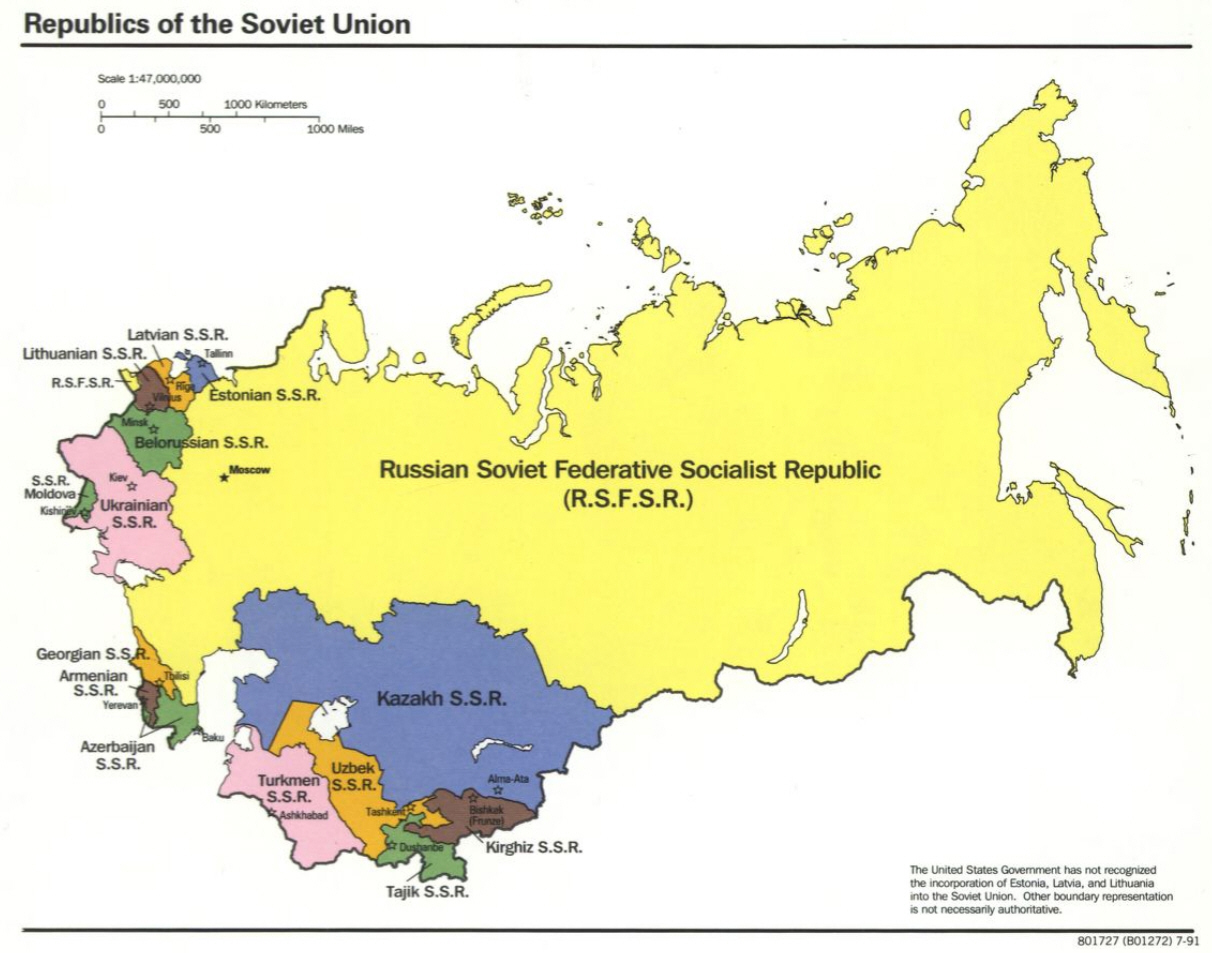
Republics of the Soviet Union in 1991

Putin has made a number of comments referring to the dissolution of the Soviet Union in 1991, often blaming it on the creation of federal republics for national minorities within the Soviet Union and on the reforms brought by Mikhail Gorbachev in the late-1980s. In 2005, he referred to it as "the greatest geopolitical catastrophe of the century". In a documentary released in 2021, he referred to it as "a disintegration of historical Russia under the name of the Soviet Union." In his 2022 "Address concerning the events in Ukraine", he referred to it as the "collapse of the historical Russia". He has also said: "Anyone who doesn't regret the passing of the Soviet Union has no heart. Anyone who wants it restored has no brains." On several occasions, Putin has blamed Communist leader Vladimir Lenin for the collapse of the Soviet Union, arguing that his favourable policies toward national minorities in the Soviet Union contributed to destabilize Russia; in his 2022 speech about Ukraine, Putin went so far to state that "modern Ukraine was entirely created by Russia or, to be more precise, by Bolshevik, Communist Russia."

Some commentators have argued these statements show that he wishes to restore the Soviet Union. After the Russian invasion of Ukraine begun, U.S. President Joe Biden stated that Putin "wants to, in fact, reestablish the former Soviet Union. That's what this is about." That claim has been disputed by many commentators. Mario Kessler of the Centre for Contemporary History has stated that Putin is rather "taking up the imperial desires of tsarist Russia" and that "Lenin's internationalism and Putin's Great Russian chauvinism are, indeed, incompatible". Cihan Tugal of the University of California, Berkeley has described Putin's view of history as one "where Ukraine and the other nations of the USSR are communist artefacts, and only Russia is real and natural". Naomi Klein has argued that Putin has been motivated in part by "a desire to overcome the shame of punishing economic shock therapy imposed on Russia at the end of the Cold War".
