= Noon Against Putin =

Protest against Vladimir Putin in the 2024 Russian presidential election

Noon against Putin Полдень против Путина
- Part of Russian opposition protest rallies and anti-war protests in Russia (2022–present)
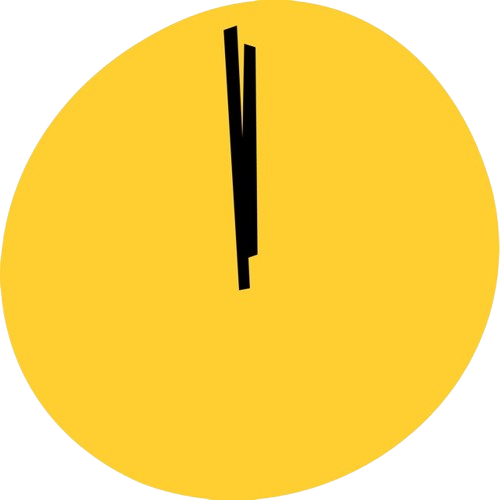
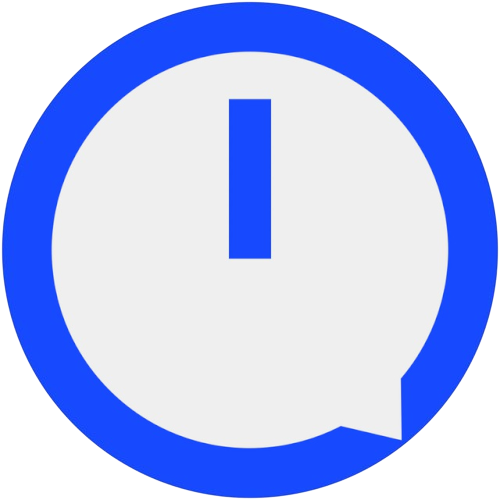
- Logos used by action organizers
- Date: 17 March 2024 at 12:00 local time
- Location: Multiple countries worldwide, including Russia
- Caused by: Opposition to the authority of Vladimir Putin
- Goals: Disruption of the 2024 Russian presidential election; Resignation of Vladimir Putin
- Methods: Protest vote, spoilt vote

Parties
Russian opposition	Government of Russia

Lead figures
Yulia Navalnaya; Mikhail Khodorkovsky; Leonid Volkov; Dmitry Gudkov; Yulia Galyamina; Mikhail Lobanov; Arseny Vesnin; Sergey Guriev; Anastasia Shevchenko; Vladimir Milov; Leonid Gozman; Abbas Gallyamov; Vladimir Pastukhov; Stanislav Belkovsky; Olga Romanova; Alexander Morozov; Alexey Venediktov; Tikhon Dzyadko; Ekaterina Kotrikadze; Ilya Shablinsky; Dmitry Oreshkin; Ilya Shepelin; Dmitry Kolezev; Lyubov Sobol; Ekaterina Schulmann; Yekaterina Duntsova; Marat Gelman; Mitya Aleshkovsky; Viktor Shenderovich; Evgeny Kiselyov; Vladimir Kara-Murza; Lev Ponomarev; Maxim Katz	(Russia) Vladimir Putin

Casualties
- Arrested: More than 75 in Russia

"Noon Against Putin" (Russian: Полдень против Путина, romanized: Polden protiv Putina) was a peaceful protest on 17 March of the 2024 Russian presidential election, where voters who do not support Vladimir Putin came en masse to polling stations at noon and vote against Putin or spoil the ballot. The protest has been described by the Novaya Gazeta as "Navalny's political testament" as it was the last political statement by prominent Russian opposition leader Alexei Navalny prior to his death.

== Background ==
=== Initiation ===
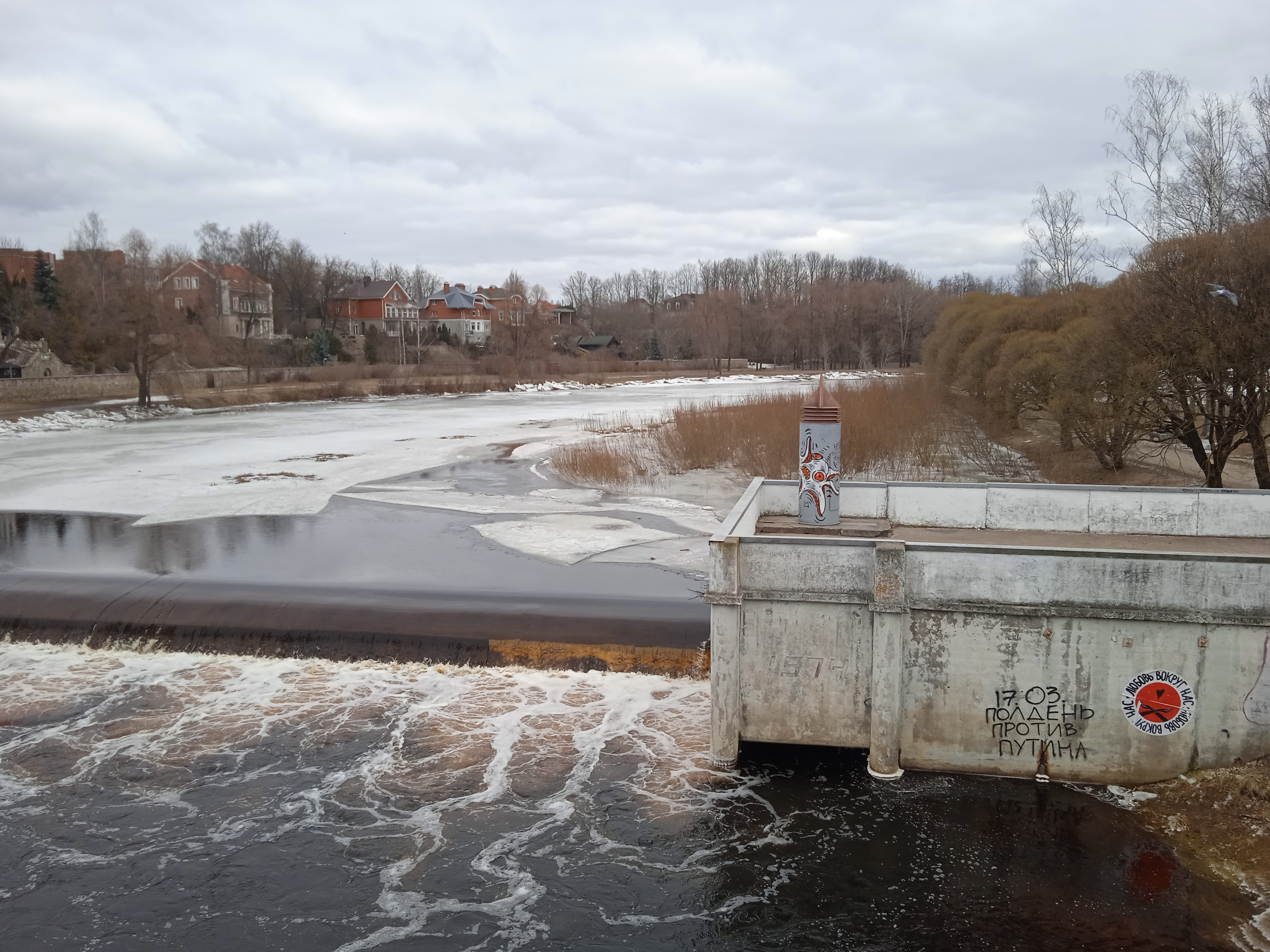
Noon against Putin, graffiti in Pskov

The author of the "Noon against Putin" action was politician Maxim Reznik.

In January 2024, Alexei Navalny called on Russians to take part in this event. Navalny's last political statement was a call to support "Noon Against Putin". In 14 January 2024, participants on the talk show "What to do?" on the independent Russian channel TV Rain proposed this unified strategy for the elections. One participant, economist Sergei Guriev, noted that the election would feature "no candidates who are better or worse [than Putin], but only one very bad candidate". Maxim Katz added that "for the first time in a long time, the entire opposition had a common goal – to campaign for a vote against Putin". Ivan Zhdanov shared the same opinion, noting on 8 February that Putin wants to divide people, and this action aims to unite people against Putin.

Initially, the Anti-Corruption Foundation considered the idea to be weak, but when they calculated and realized that with the number of 2058 polling stations in only one city, Moscow, if at least half a million people simultaneously come to the rally, then this will be 250 like-minded people for each of the polling stations – a lot of people at each site.

The action was also supported by Mikhail Khodorkovsky, Dmitry Gudkov, Yulia Galyamina, Mikhail Lobanov, Arseny Vesnin, Sergey Guriev, Anastasia Shevchenko, Vladimir Milov, Leonid Gozman, Abbas Gallyamov, Vladimir Pastukhov, Stanislav Belkovsky, Olga Romanova, Alexander Morozov, Alexey Venediktov, Tikhon Dzyadko, Ekaterina Kotrikadze, Ilya Shablinsky, Dmitry Oreshkin, Ilya Shepelin, Dmitry Kolezev, Lyubov Sobol, Ekaterina Shulman, Ekaterina Duntsova, Marat Gelman, Mitya Aleshkovsky, Viktor Shenderovich, Evgeny Kiselyov, Vladimir Kara-Murza, Lev Ponomarev and other public figures.

According to the author of the action:

This action is about the unity of the place and time of our protest against Putin. That is, objective parameters on which there is no need to argue and which the authorities cannot change... This is not an election – this is a "special election operation". Why does Putin need it? To prove the unity of the Fuhrer and the nation: there is Putin – there is Russia. It is important for him to confirm once again this thesis, which many already believe. Our task is to show that everything is exactly the opposite... Therefore, it is important for us to show ourselves and the world that there are many of us. So this noon should be everywhere: in Kaliningrad, Vladivostok, St. Petersburg, in the Nile Valley and on the top of Everest. This will be a Russian afternoon where Russians must demonstrate their attitude towards Putin. And doing it on site is safe and legal.

Alexey Navalny described the action as a safe and legal way to express his protest. Alexei Navalny also spoke about safety for those participating, since at this time the turnout is already high and there are a lot of voters, "and it is simply impossible to single out those who vote 'against'".

Political scientist Abbas Gallyamov on 1 February 2024, agreeing that this is a performance, but, in his opinion, with a sufficient number of participants, "the Russian security forces and bureaucrats, the West, and Ukraine will see that Putin is not as legitimate as everyone thought". A similar idea was expressed by Dmitry Kolezev.

According to a Radio Liberty study conducted on 5 February 2024, the initiative is actively discussed on social networks. Leonid Volkov notes that it is especially important to support the initiative in large cities. Sergei Boyko reminds that when collecting signatures, the idea of showing the mass scale of the protest has already worked before. Dmitry Gudkov believes that the 2024 elections should be treated as "Putin's special election operation", and although Putin will get more than 80% support, "the opposition needs to jointly show the artificiality of Putin’s result."

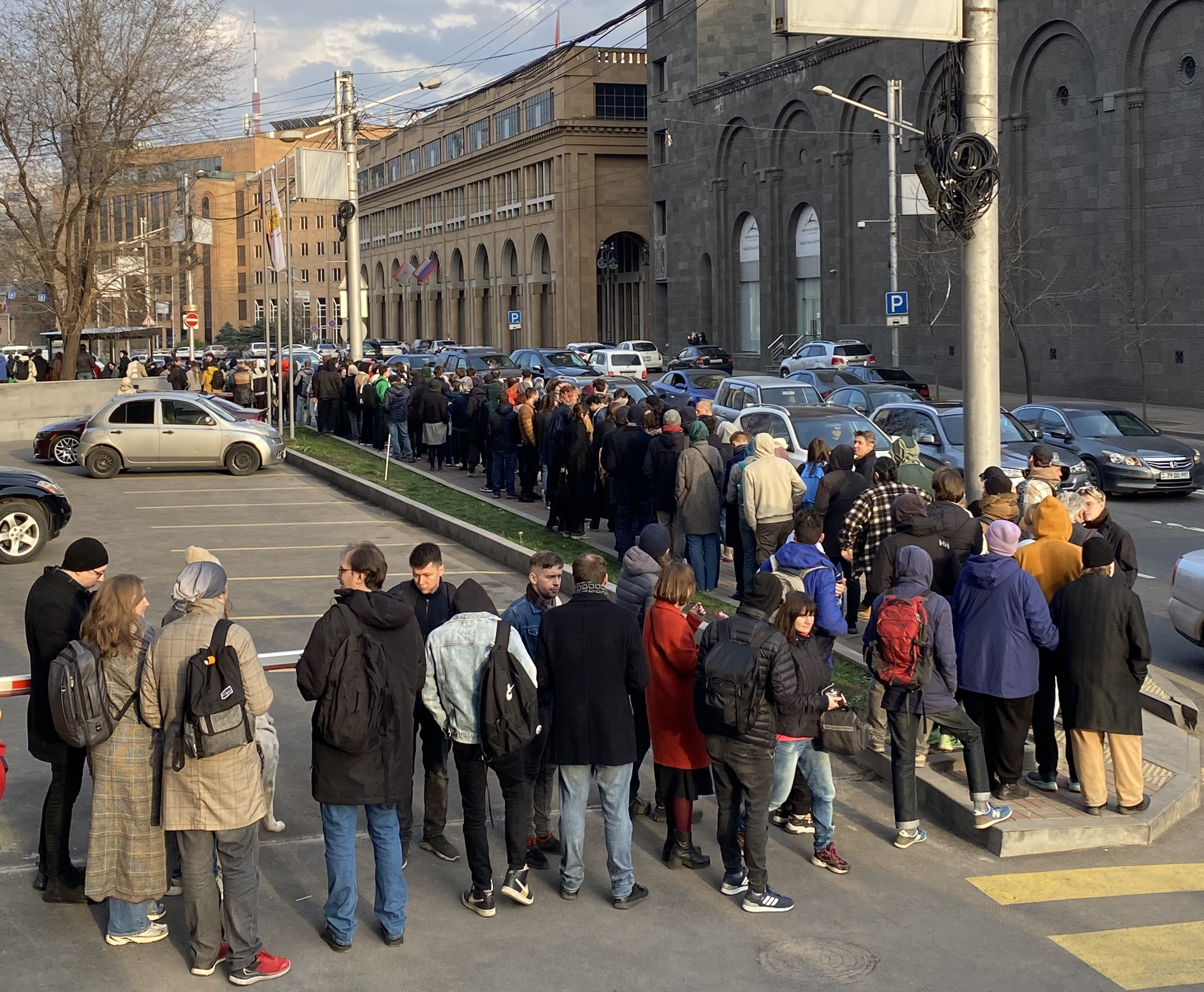
Russians in exile outside the Russian embassy in Yerevan, Armenia as part of the "Noon Against Putin" protest.

On 28 February, the manifesto of the civil movement "Peace. Progress. Human Rights", was prepared by human rights activist Lev Ponomarev and his colleagues. Among other things, the manifesto calls for making the "Noon against Putin" action truly mass-scale: "Only mass participation gives a chance to influence the situation. So let's ensure that the whole of Russia stands in line at the polling stations, and the whole world sees it." The authors of the text called on the opposition to overcome differences and strengthen common action. "The task of the opposition in these weeks is to be with the Russians, to offer them relatively safe options for action, to maximize their voice, to agitate the doubters", the manifesto says.

On 3 March, Kirill Martynov, in an interview with Idel.Realii (a news outlet associated with Radio Liberty), noted that he considered the action good and believed that it was necessary to participate in it. He was echoed by the head of the Watch, Evgeny Kochegin, who believes that the main thing is to fulfill Navalny's last will.

== Opposition from the authorities ==
On 2 February, authorities threatened Yulia Galyamina with criminal charges for organizing the protest.

On 2 March 2024, Roskomnadzor blocked the campaign's website, vpolden.org. As of writing, within Russia, it is only accessible through VPNs or anonymizers.

Former Legislative Assembly deputy Sergei Gulyaev shared information that Roskomnadzor sent a notice demanding that Gulyaev's video with a statement about the action be removed from the YouTube service.

On 3 March 2024, the authorities of several Russian cities decided to hold Maslenitsa festivities at the same time as the "Noon against Putin" protest. This has drawn comparisons to the Shashlik Live music festival, held amid the 2019 Moscow protests.

On 27 February 2024, Latvian Minister of Justice Inese Lībiņa-Egnere expressed her opinion that Russians living in Latvia planning to attend the election "essentially support" Russia's invasion of Ukraine. On 11 March 2024, the Chief of the State police Armands Ruks warned that Russian citizens visiting the Russian embassy to vote during 15–17 March would undergo police screenings; those found to be illegal immigrants might be deported.

On 14 March 2024, the Moscow Prosecutor's Office released a press statement, stating that it considered organizing and/or participating in "mass events" involving "simultaneous arrival at polling stations" illegal, in a veiled reference to the campaign.

== See also ==
- Boycott of Russia and Belarus
- Reactions to the Russian invasion of Ukraine
