= Pastukhov =

Pastukhov, feminine:Pastukhova is a Russian surname. Notable people with the surname include:

- Nikolai Pastukhov (1923–2014), Soviet and Russian actor
- Vladimir Pastukhov (born 1963), Russian political scientist, lawyer, and honorary professor
- Yaroslav Pastukhov (born 1990), Ukrainian-born Canadian author, former prisoner, drug smuggler, and music editor
