= Lobach =

Lobach may refer to:

- Lobach (Eschbach), a river of North Rhine-Westphalia, Germany
- a district of Bevern, Lower Saxony, Germany
- Lobach (surname), a surname
