= Life and Technology of the Future =

- Original title: Жизнь и техника будущего
- Language: Russian
- Publisher: Moskvskiy rabochiy
- Publication date: 1928

Life and Technology of the Future (Russian: Жизнь и техника будущего) was an anthology of Utopian material published in the Soviet Union in 1928.

The first part consisted of translations and reprints from Plato, Thomas Campanella, Claude Henri de Saint-Simon, Etienne Cabet, Robert Owen, Charles Fourier and Alexander Bogdanov.

The second part consisted of contemporaneous articles by:

- Boris Lobach-Zhuchenko, marine engineer, arrested in July 1927, released 1933 and died of natural causes 1938.
- Pavel Blokhin
- Alexander Chayanov, an agrarian economist, subsequently arrested first in 1930.
- Aleksandr Yakovlevich Orlov, astronomer contributed “Astronomic Utopias” in which he discussed the potential living on Mars and the Moon and provided a sketch of what he thought an engine for interplanetary travel might look like.
- Nikolai Melik-Pashaev
- Aron Zalkind (1888–1936), a psychologist. He was accused of "Menshevist-idealistic eclecticism" in 1931. He was later obliged to recant his Freudian views.
