= Aleksandr Orlov (astronomer) =

Russian astronomer (1880–1954)

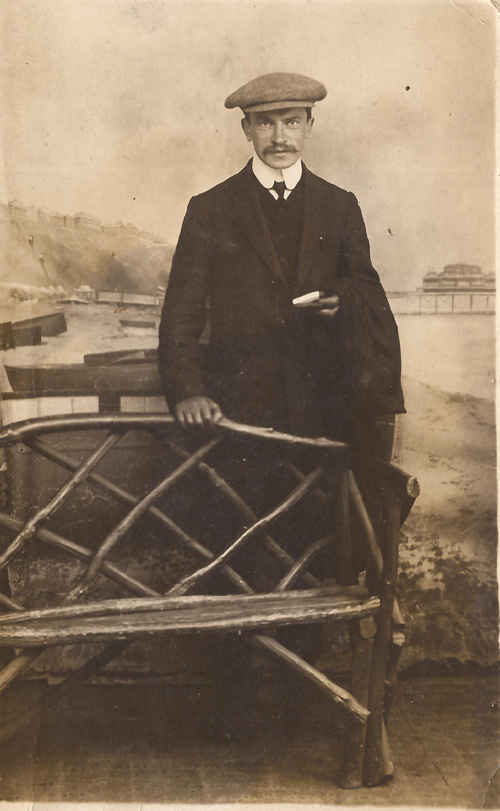
- Aleksandr Orlov in 1912
- Born: Aleksandr Yakovlevich Orlov; 6 April 1880; Smolensk, Russian Empire
- Died: 28 January 1954 (aged 73); Kyiv, Ukrainian SSR, Soviet Union
- Scientific career
- Academic advisors: Carl Charlier; Emil Wiechert

Aleksandr Yakovlevich Orlov (Russian: Александр Яковлевич Орлов; 6 April 1880, Smolensk – 28 January 1954, Kyiv) was an astronomer and pioneer of geodynamics.

Orlov studied at Saint Petersburg University, graduating with distinction in 1902. He subsequently developed his scientific background through study at the University of Paris, at the Lund University under Carl Charlier then at the University of Göttingen under with Emil Wiechert.

In 1927, Orlov was elected a corresponding member of the Academy of Sciences of the Soviet Union; in 1934-38 he was a professor of astronomy at the P. K. Sternberg Astronomical Institute in Moscow. From 1938 to 1951, he again headed the Poltava Observatory, and in 1939 he became a member of the Academy of Sciences of the Ukrainian SSR. He contributed the essay “Astronomic Utopias” to the 1928 book Life and Technology of the Future in which he discussed the possibility of settling on Mars and the Moon.

Orlov played a major role in the creation of the Main Astronomical Observatory of the National Academy of Sciences of Ukraine, based in Golosseevo outside Kyiv. He was appointed as the first director in 1944, a position he held until 1948, and again from 1951 to 1952.
