= The Twelve Sexual Commandments of the Revolutionary Proletariat =

1924 work by Aron Zalkind

The Twelve Sexual Commandments of the Revolutionary Proletariat (Russian: Двенадцать половых заповедей революционного пролетариата) was an influential work by the Soviet psychologist Aron Zalkind, published in 1924. It was devoted to the issues of streamlining the personal lives of men and women in the USSR on the basis of class and proletarian ethics. The prevalent doctrine prior to its publication was the Glass of water theory, which was heavily criticized by Zalkind. The Commandments effectively replaced it in the official Soviet ideology.

== Content ==
1. There must be no premature development of sexual life among the proletariat.
2. Sexual abstinence is necessary before marriage, and marriage should be only made in a state of full social and biological maturity (that is, 20-25 years).
3. Sexual intercourse is only the final completion of deep comprehensive sympathy and affection for the object of sexual love.
4. Sexual intercourse must only be the final link in the chain of deep and complex experiences that bind lovers at the moment.
5. Sexual intercourse should not be repeated frequently.
6. The sexual object must not be changed often. There must be less sexual variety.
7. Love must be monogamous and monoandrous (one wife, one husband).
8. In every sexual intercourse, one must always remember the possibility of the conception of a child and, in general, be mindful of offspring.
9. Sexual selection must be built along the line of class, that is, the revolutionary-proletarian expediency. Elements of flirtation, courtship, coquetry, and other methods of specifically sexual conquest should not be introduced into love relationships.
10. There must be no jealousy. Sexual love life, built on mutual respect, equality, deep ideological closeness, and mutual trust cannot allow lies, suspicion, or jealousy.
11. There should be no sexual perversions.
12. The class, in the interests of revolutionary expediency, has the right to interfere in the sexual life of its members. The sexual must be subordinate to the class in everything, not interfering with the latter in any way, serving it in everything.

== History ==
A. B. Zalkind attached great importance to the sexual question in issues of the hygiene of party work. He believed that modern man in everyday life suffers from sexual fetishism, which should be overcome with the help of science and that sex should be returned to the right track: "It is necessary that the collective is more attracted to itself than to a love partner." It was in this way that The Twelve Sexual Commandments of the Revolutionary Proletariat were born. The general meaning of these sexual commandments was to ensure that the energy of the proletariat, as an integral class, was not wasted on sexual relations that are useless for its historical mission.

== Literature ==
- Zalkind, Aron Borisovich (1924). The Twelve Sexual Commandments of the Revolutionary Proletariat. Moscow: Ya. M. Sverdlov Communist University.
- Sytnik, Irina Gennadievna (2006). Women question in the policy of the state and its solution in the South Urals: 1918-1930 (Thesis). Orenburg: Orenburg State Pedagogical University. p. 194.

== See also ==
- Glass of water theory
