= Lobachev =

Lobachev (feminine: Lobacheva), sometimes transliterated Lobačev, is an East Slavic surname. Notable people with the surname include:

- Irina Lobacheva (born 1973), Russian ice dancer
- Leonid Lobachev (born 1966), Belarusian weightlifter
- Đorđe Lobačev (1909–2002)), Serbian and Russian comics artist

== See also ==
- Lobach (surname)
- Lobachevsky
