= Lobach (surname) =

Lobach is a surname with multiple etymologies.

As an East Slavic surname (Cyrillic: Лобач), it is typically transliterated Lobach in English-speaking countries but may also appear as Lobač (scholarly or Czech-style transliteration), Lobatch (French-style), Lobatsch (German-style) and Lobacz (Polish-style).

Lobach also has other origins including German Löbach and Norwegian Løbach. Both are unrelated to the East Slavic surname.

== People ==
- Anastasia Lobach (born 1987), Belarusian handball player
- Boris Lobach-Zhuchenko (1875–1938), Russian scientist and writer
- Marina Lobatch (born 1970), Soviet-Belarusian rhythmic gymnast
- Rebecca M. Lobach (1996–2025), American military officer who perished in the 2025 Potomac River mid-air collision
- Tatiana Lobach (born 1974), Russian politician

== See also ==
- Lobachev
- Lobachevsky
