= Glass of water theory =

Doctrine in communism

The glass of water theory is a doctrine asserting that in a communist society, satisfying sexual desires and love will be as simple and unimportant as drinking a glass of water. The theory is commonly associated with Alexandra Kollontai, although such characterization ignores the complexity of her theoretical work. Anatoly Lunacharsky criticized the theory in his article "On Everyday Life: Young People and the 'Glass of Water' Theory". The theory's place in the Soviet ideological framework was later replaced by The Twelve Sexual Commandments of the Revolutionary Proletariat by Aron Zalkind.

1929 is considered the year of the end of the Bolshevik sexual revolution and the theory of the glass of water as its basis. However, several researchers in the history of the sexual revolution in the USSR argue that the sexual revolution formally ended in 1935 with the enactment of a law criminalizing pornography.
