= Dmitry Oreshkin =

Soviet and Russian political scientist (born 1953)

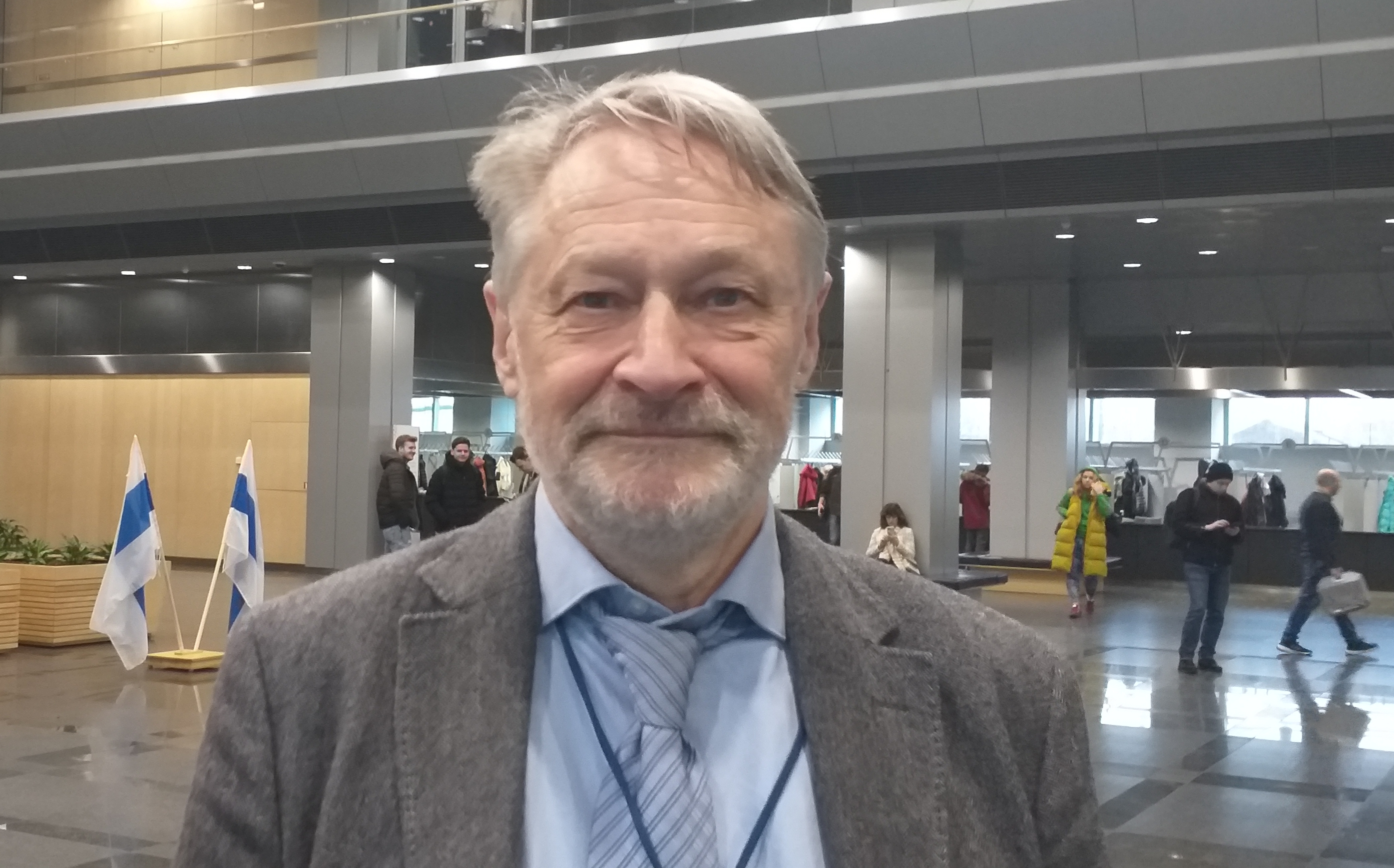
Dmitry Oreshkin in 2023

Dmitry Borisovich Oreshkin (Russian: Дмитрий Борисович Орешкин; born 27 June 1953) is a Soviet and Russian political scientist and political geographer.

He was born in Moscow. He graduated from special school No. 49 in Moscow in 1970, the Faculty of Geography of Moscow State University in 1975, and received a Ph.D. from the Institute of Geography of the Academy of Sciences of the Soviet Union in 1979 (his thesis was on ancient continental glaciations).

In 1993, together with Andrem Skvortsov and Alexander Belyaev, he set up the analytical group "Mercator" (Mercator Group). It was said that using the money earned from a documentary about the Aral Sea disaster, the group bought an Intel 80286 PC computer in 1993 and began drawing electronic maps showing the results of the elections, the growth of crime, environmental crises and vodka consumption by region.

The group has been producing electronic maps for TV since 1994. Collaborated with the Results Yevgeny Kiselyov, NTV, in 1995–1996 he served at the regional Department of JSC Russia's Public television (ORT). He makes live maps weather forecast for Meteo-TV. Engaged in computer simulation for leading news TV channels of Russia.

The Mercator group provided at the invitation of the Central Election Commission some analytical support and displayed the process and results of Russian Legislative and President Elections. It also made an electronic atlas of crisis situations for the Security Council of Russia.

In the 2001 he was named Rambler Man of the year in the category Cities and regions.

In 2007, he ran for the State Duma from Union of Right Forces.

June 2, 2012 he spoke at a rally on Bolotnaya square.

April 1, 2014 in his blog on the radio Echo of Moscow website, he strongly criticized Russia for its foreign policy towards Ukraine, saying that: "An Ambitious story began with a promise to return Ukraine (whole thing!) in the sphere of influence of Moscow, embedding it into the Customs Union and the Eurasian system of values. This is the maximum program. It obviously failed. It is the turn of the program-at least — to take under the wing of at least the Eastern Ukraine along with Crimea Today... ambitions declined: we hear passionate speeches about "our" Kharkiv and Donbas; less about Odesa. Kyiv for 10 years slowly migrated to the West, the natural consequence of the greater attraction of the European system of values in comparison with Patriotic tales of the Corporation."
