= Abbas Gallyamov =

Russian political scientist and commentator

- Аббас Галлямов
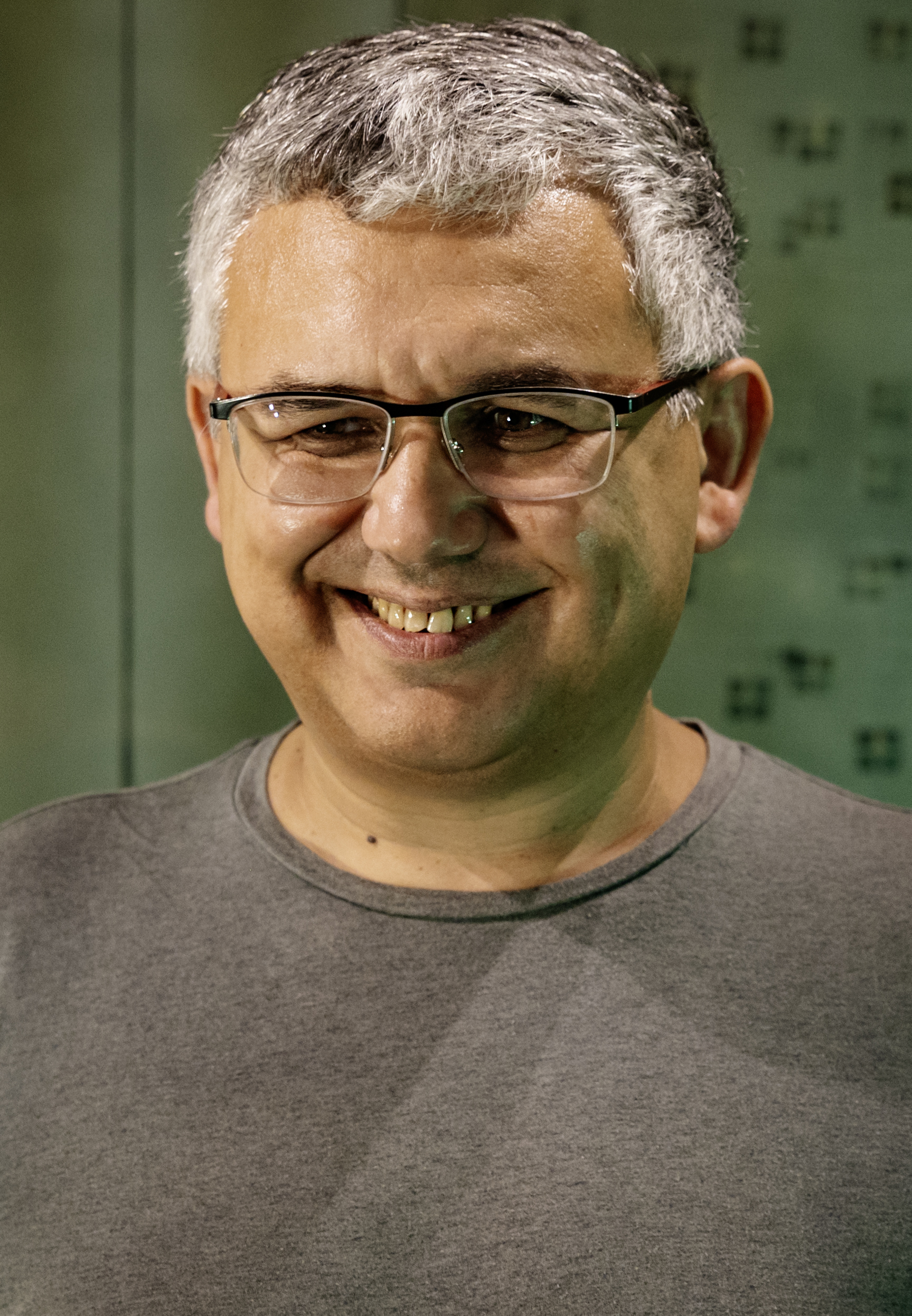
- Gallyamov in 2024
- Born: Abbas Radikovich Gallyamov; 30 May 1972 (age 54); Chelyabinsk, Russian SFSR, Soviet Union
- Education: Bashkir State Pedagogical Institute; Russian Presidential Academy of Public Administration
- Occupations: Political scientist, campaign manager, speechwriter, political commentator, opinion journalist

Abbas Radikovich Gallyamov (Russian: Аббас Радикович Галлямов, Bashkir: Аббас Радик улы Галләмов; born 30 May 1972) is a Russian political scientist and opinion journalist of Bashkir origin. He is known for being Vladimir Putin's speechwriter during the latter's premiership between 2008 and 2010.

== Early life ==
An ethnic Bashkir, he was born in 1972 in Chelyabinsk. In 1995, he graduated from the Bashkir State Pedagogical Institute in Ufa, and in 2001, from the Russian Presidential Academy of Public Administration. He holds a Candidate of Sciences degree (Ph.D. equivalent) in political science, with a thesis titled "The Leader and the Leader’s Image in the Modern Political Process: Problems of Conceptualization and Mediatization".

== In government ==
From 2001 to 2002, he served as head of the press service for the political party Union of Right Forces. Between 2002 and 2008, he was Deputy Plenipotentiary Envoy of the Republic of Bashkortostan to the President of Russia.

From 2008 to 2010, he worked in the Department for Preparing Public Addresses of the Russian Government, drafting speeches for then-Prime Minister Vladimir Putin.

In 2010, Gallyamov returned to Bashkortostan, where until 2014 he served as Deputy Head of the Administration of the President of Bashkortostan, Rustem Khamitov.

== Post-government ==
In July 2017, he joined the Public Chamber of Krasnogorsk, Moscow Oblast.

As a campaign manager, he participated in regional election campaigns and was a member of the Academic-Expert Council of Russia's Central Election Commission from 2018 to 2019.

In 2020, he joined the expert council of the New People political party.

Gallyamov’s political commentary has been published in Vedomosti, Forbes, and Republic. Currently, he works as a political commentator, frequently appearing on Russian-language online media platforms and providing commentary for various international outlets. He maintains his own Telegram channel.

In early 2022, Gallyamov relocated to Israel.

On 30 September 2022, he published a report titled "The 'Successor' Project: Prospects, Conditions, and Candidates", examining the issue of power transition in Russia.

On February 10, 2023, the Russian justice ministry added Gallyamov to its "foreign agents" list.

In March 2023, the Russian internal ministry placed him on a wanted list. Around the same time, it was reported that the Investigative Committee of Russia had opened a criminal case against him under the article on "discrediting the Russian Armed Forces". Media sources suggested this was linked to his April 2022 interview with the YouTube channel Groschi (a project of the Ukrainian TV network 1+1), in which he discussed the Bucha massacre and the Kramatorsk railway station attack. On 29 July 2024, Gallyamov was convicted in absentia and sentenced to eight years in prison.
