= Aron Zalkind =

Soviet psychologist (1888–1936)

Aron Borissovich Zalkind (Russian: Аро́н Бори́сович За́лкинд; 17 June 1888 – July 1936) was a Soviet psychologist, paedologist and psychoanalyst.

== Life ==
He was born in Kharkiv, and became a student of Vladimir Serbsky. Before World War I he developed an interest in the theories of Alfred Adler.

After the October Revolution, Zalkind worked for the People's Commissariat for Education where was involved in the development of communist pedagogy.

In August 1928, Zalkind was the chairman of the Interdepartmental Planning Pedological Commission under the People's Commissariat of Education; in the same year a new journal was founded, Zalkind was appointed to the position of the first editor-in-chief of the Pedology journal.

Originally trained as a psychoanalyst, Zalkind was involved in an attempt to promote "Freudism" as an interpretation of psychoanalysis compatible with Marxism-Leninism. When this proved politically impossible, he became an advocate of paedology and when he took over as Director of the Psychological Institute of Moscow it was renamed the Institute of Psychology, Paedology and Industrial Psychology.

At the end of 1931, he was accused of "Menshevik-idealistic eclecticism", and was also subjected for his Freudianism and "perversions at work"; Zalkind publicly admitted the fallacy of his scientific and social work, in particular in the field of psychoanalysis and Freudianism. Nevertheless, in December 1931, Zalkind was removed from the post of director of the Institute of Psychology, Pedology and Psychotechnics and from removed from his position as editor of the Pedology journal.

In July 1936, he died on the street from a heart attack after a meeting at which his scientific and administrative activities were criticized. There have also been claims about Zalkind committing suicide..

He was buried at the Novodevichy Cemetery.

== Works ==
His most famous text was The Twelve Sexual Commandments of the Revolutionary Proletariat (1925). Here Zalkind argues for sexual abstinence and a monogamous relationship between the man and woman.

In 1928 with Ernst Kolman he edited Life and Technology of the Future: Social and Scientific-Technical Utopias, an anthology of various historic utopian texts supplemented by six texts written by the contemporary Soviet intellectuals. Whereas the first five of these depict non-political technocratic utopias, the sixth, by Zalkind, entitled "The Psychology of the Future Man (Socio-Psychological Study)" was more critical: Zalkind criticised previous utopian writers for their inability to realise their utopias, something which could at that time be overcome, he claimed, thanks to the scientific nature of Marxism-Leninism. He then described a future where social environment would be transformed by a "mature Communist" ideology: human body function would alter, women would give birth to children less frequently and would experience easier pregnancies; sexuality would be less "spontaneous" both physically and emotionally. Personal physical instincts would become social instincts; people succumb less frequently to physical and mental exhaustion. However the bodies of future humanity would be smaller and finer, while their life expectancy would be almost infinite.

In 1930 Zalkind wrote a hostile preface to Sigmund Freud's The Future of an Illusion, which was the last of Freud's works to be translated into Russian in the Soviet Era.
