= Arnold Beichman =

American author (1913–2010)

- Born: May 17, 1913; New York City, US
- Died: February 16, 2010 (aged 96); Pasadena, California, US
- Education: Columbia University (BA, MA, PhD)
- Occupations: Author, scholar, anti-communist polemicist

Arnold Beichman (May 17, 1913 – February 17, 2010) was an author, scholar, and a critic of communism. At the time of his death, he was a Hoover Institution research fellow and a columnist for The Washington Times.

== Life and career ==
Beichman was born on New York City's Lower East Side, in Manhattan, in a family of Ukrainian-Jewish immigrants from Ukraine. He received a B.A. from Columbia University in 1934, after which he succeeded his friend, Arthur Lelyveld, as editor-in-chief of the Columbia Daily Spectator.

Beichman spent many years in journalism, working for the New York Herald Tribune, PM, Newsweek, and others. He returned to Columbia in his 50s to receive his M.A. and Ph.D. in political science, in 1967 and 1973, respectively.

He gave his name to "Beichman's Law," which states: "With the single exception of the American Revolution, the aftermath of all revolutions from 1789 on only worsened the human condition." His Jewish father, Solomon Beichman, was unhappy because he wanted Arnold to be a rabbi.

The Cold War International History Project at the Woodrow Wilson International Center for Scholars was in part funded by Beichman's donations.

== Publications ==
Books

- The "Other" State Department: The United States Mission to the United Nations — Its Role in the Making of Foreign Policy (1968)
- Nine Lies About America (1972)

Foreword by Tom Wolfe.

- Andropov: New Challenge to the West (1983)

Introduction by Robert Conquest.

- Herman Wouk: The Novelist as Social Historian (1984)
- The Long Pretense: Soviet Treaty Diplomacy from Lenin to Gorbachev (1991)

Foreword by William F. Buckley, Jr.

- Anti-American Myths: Their Causes and Consequences (1992)

Foreword by Tom Wolfe.

Books edited

- CNN's Cold War Documentary: Issues and Controversy (2000)

With Robert Conquest, John Lewis Gaddis and Richard Pipes.

Articles

- "Socialism: Dead or Alive? A Roundtable." The American Enterprise, July 1995, pp. 28–35.

With David Horowitz, John O'Sullivan, Eric Breindel and Mark Falcoff.

- "The Lesser Evil." The Washington Post, November 4, 2004.
