= Boris Lobach-Zhuchenko =

- Born: July 6, 1875
- Died: May 28, 1938 (aged 62)
- Education: Saint Petersburg State Institute of Technology

Boris Mikhailovich Lobach-Zhuchenko (6 July 1875 - May 28, 1938, Tarusa) was a scientist, marine engineer and naval writer from the Russian Empire and later the Soviet Union.

After school he studied at the Saint Petersburg State Institute of Technology.

He participated in the Russian-Japanese war, including the Battle of Port Arthur. He served as a mechanical engineer of the fleet until 1917.

He taught at the Bauman Moscow State Technical University.

He was the writer of many textbooks and scientific articles on maritime matters.
