= Vladimir Pastukhov =

Russian political scientist, publicist and lawyer

- Владимир Борисович Пастухов
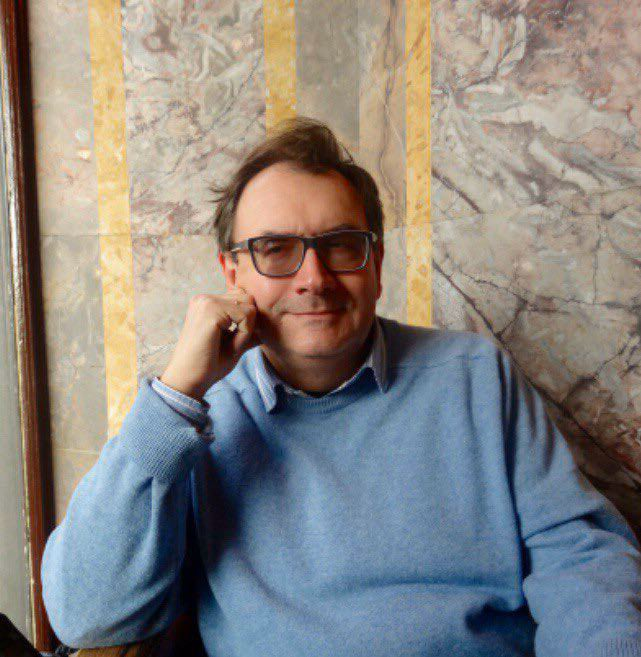
- Born: April 22, 1963; Kyiv, Ukrainian SSR, Soviet Union
- Education: Taras Shevchenko National University of Kyiv; Institute of State and Law; Institute for Comparative Political Science of the Russian Academy of Sciences
- Scientific career
- Fields: Jurisprudence; Political science
- Workplaces: Higher School of Economics; University College London
- Theses: The political power in socialistic society: the essence and the appearance (gnosiological aspect of the study) (1989); The historical-cultural conditionality of evolution of the political power in Russia (1995)

Vladimir Borisovitch Pastukhov (Russian: Влади́мир Бори́сович Пастухо́в; born 22 April 1963) is a Russian political scientist, lawyer (advocate) and honorary professor of the University College London's School of Slavonic and East European Studies. He is an author of the so-called "constitution by concepts", which is a written code of unwritten rules that define the real substance of life in Russia.

== Biography ==
=== Early life ===
Vladimir Pastukhov was born on 22 April 1963 in Kyiv. His father was an advocate, his mother was an economist. After secondary school graduation, Vladimir Pastukhov enrolled at the Faculty of Law of the Kyiv State University, from which he graduated in 1985 with a specialist degree in law.

=== Postgraduate education ===
In 1989, Pastukhov defended his thesis on the topic "The political power in socialistic society: the essence and the appearance (gnosiological aspect of the study)" at the Institute of State and Law and became a candidate of juridical sciences.

In 1995, he defended his thesis on the topic "The historical-cultural conditionality of evolution of the political power in Russia" at the Institute for Comparative Political Science of the Russian Academy of Sciences and became a doctor of political sciences.

=== Legal practice ===
Vladimir Pastukhov became a Russian advocate in 1999. As for January 2026, he is a Russian advocate (register number 77/520), a member of the advocate's chamber of Moscow city. He carries out professional activity in Moscow city collegium of advocates, namely in its subdivision named "Advocate's office № 21".

As an advocate, Pastukhov specialized in corporate disputes. In 2000s, he represented the interests of Hermitage Capital Management in its conflict with Russian authorities. In July 2008, he and his colleague Eduard Khayretdinov as a representers of Hermitage Capital Management filed a complaint demanding to open a criminal case for fraud to a law-enforcement agencies. After that, Russian police conducted a search in the office of advocate's law firm, during which powers of attorney issued by the Hermitage Capital Management to advocates were seized. Russian investigative agencies opened a criminal case under the article 327 of the Criminal Code "Use of a deliberately forged document" on the ground that "foreign owners of the fund were not be able to issue the powers of attorney to Russian advocates because these owners have not entered the territory of the Russian Federation"; the defence's argument, that the personal visit to Russia of owners of the fund was not necessary for issuing powers of attorney to Russian advocates, was found as "unconvincing". At that time, Pastukhov left Russia and began to live in London. The criminal case was closed in September 2010 due to the expiration of the statute of limitations for criminal prosecution. Alexander Antipov, an advocate who defended Pastukhov in this case, appealed the relevant investigator's decision, demanding to change the legal ground of closing the case to the absence of corpus delicti.

=== Academic career ===
In 1989–1995, Pastukhov worked in the Institute of International Labour Movement (Moscow). In 1995–1999, he was a leading research associate of the Institute of Latin American Studies (Moscow). In 1999–2008, he was a scientific director of the Institute of Law and Public Policy (Moscow). Also he taught law at the Higher School of Economics.

After fleeing from Russia, Pastukhov continued scientific and teaching activity in United Kingdom. Since 2015, he is honorary senior research associate of the University College London's School of Slavonic and East European Studies.

=== Activity as publicist ===
Pastukhov is an expert on Russian politics. He wrote many analytical articles dedicated to Russian politics and legal system. He is a columnist of the Novaya Gazeta, the Republic.ru, the Kasparov.ru, the MBK-media, the Echo of Moscow (until its closure in 2022).

=== "Foreign agent" status ===
On 5 May 2023, the Ministry of Justice of the Russian Federation declared Vladimir Pastukhov a "foreign agent".

=== Family ===
Vladimir Pastukhov has a wife Julia, whom he married in 1988. The couple has a son Boris, who was born in 1993 in Moscow, and who is an English solicitor now (register number 638500).

== Notable works ==
=== Books ===
- Три времени России. Общество и государство в прошлом–настоящем–будущем. (Moscow. 1994. ISBN 5-86004-015-6)
- Украинская революция и русская контрреволюция. (Moscow. 2014. ISBN 978-5-94282-744-1)
- Революция и конституция в посткоммунистической России. (Moscow. 2018. ISBN 978-5-94282-830-1)

=== Articles ===
- Государство диктатуры люмпен-пролетариата. Для России сегодня актуально не демократическое, а национально-освободительное движение. (Novaya Gazeta. 15.08.2012. No.91)
- Конституционный тупик. Допустима ли дискуссия о маршрутах эвакуации из авторитарного государства? (Novaya Gazeta. 12.10.2018. No.113)
- «Крысы» вместо юристов. Почему требование правового государства должно стать для России главным лозунгом десятилетия. (Novaya Gazeta. 07.01.2020.)
- Переучредить Россию! За фасадом транзита власти и текстом послания президента скрывается идея создания корпоративного государства. Такое уже было, и не в СССР. (Novaya Gazeta. 22.01.2020. No.6)
- Революция отходит с Белорусского вокзала. Стратегия мирного протеста серьёзно дискредитирована в Минске. (Novaya Gazeta. 18.09.2020. No.102)
- Операция «Русская хромосома». Что делать после. (Novaya Gazeta. 23.03.2022. No.30)
