= Tolstoy House =

Apartment building in St Petersburg, Russia

Coordinates: 59°55′46″N 30°20′31″E

Tolstoy house
- Доходный дом графа М. П. Толстого
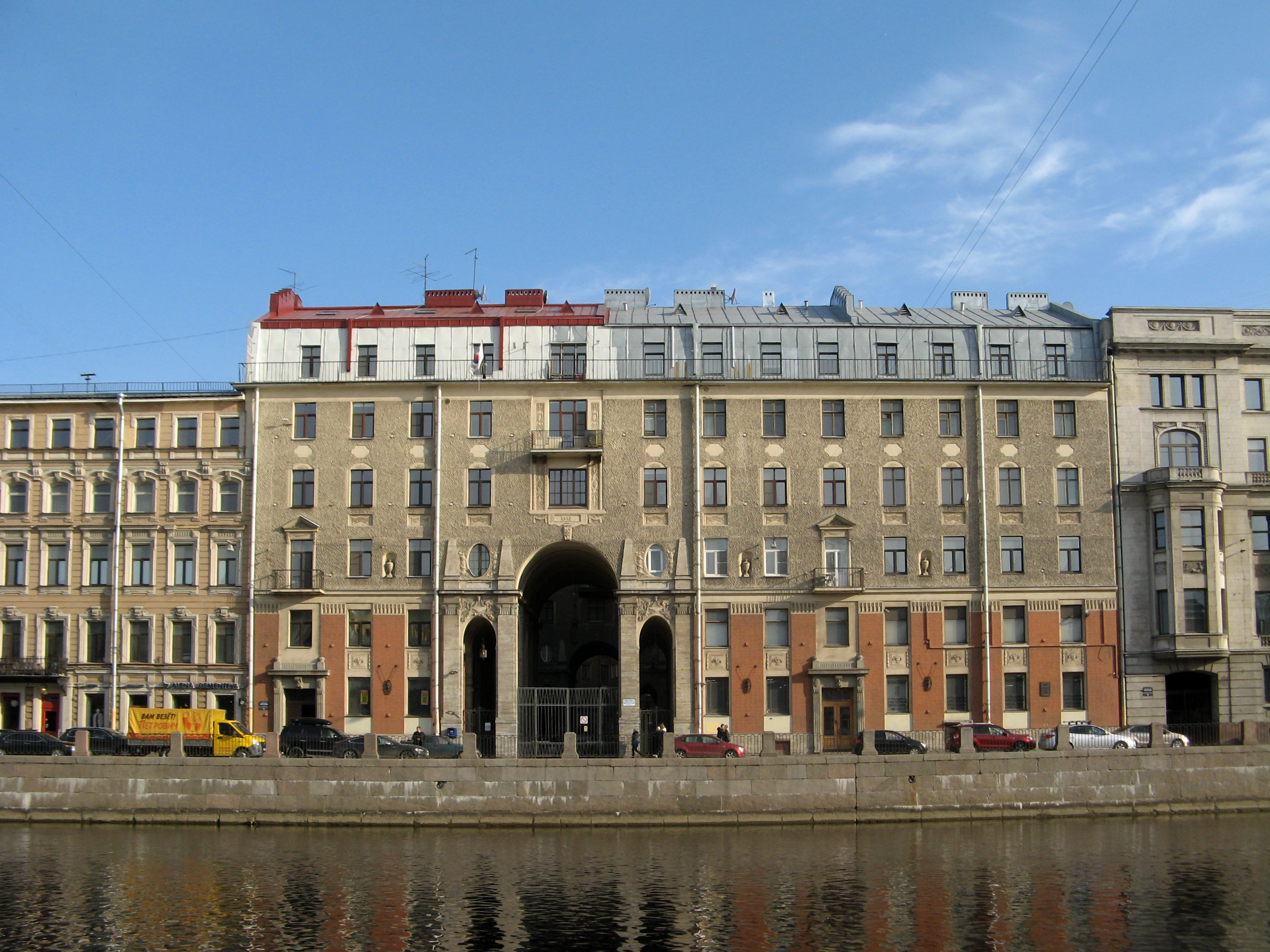
- Tolstoy House in 2020

General information
- Architectural style: National Romantic style
- Completed: 1912

Design and construction
- Architect: Fyodor Lidval
- Engineer: Dmitry Smirnov

The Tolstoy House is a well-known apartment building in St. Petersburg, located at 15-17 Rubinstein Street and 54 Fontanka Embankment. The building was constructed in 1910–1912 under the aegis of Major-General Count Mikhail Pavlovich Tolstoy, nephew of the 1812 war hero P. A. Tolstoy. The architect Fyodor Lidval designed it in Nordic Art Nouveau. The construction is interesting for its inner street with three connected yards where the facades were decorated as richly as the front ones. Three-storey arches leading to the inner street are the architectural dominants of the compositions.

After Tolstoy's death in 1913, ownership passed to his widow Countess Olga Tolstoy (born a princess of the Vasilchikov family, daughter of Prince Alexander Illarionovich Vasilchikov, a second in the famous 1841 duel between Mikhail Lermontov and Nikolai Martynov). For a century of its history, the building hosted numerous famous residents.

In 2008, the house was made a protected art and cultural monument of regional significance.

== History ==
=== Land and owners ===
The data on this land goes back to the first quarter of the 19th century when it was owned by merchant's wife Nikulina. Her estate included four houses, sheds and barns, ice storage room, stables, orchards and vegetable garden. In 1860 the estate was bought out by Mariya Fyodorovna Ruadze; she ordered the house to be rebuilt in stone and connected to the outhouse wing. The reconstruction turned out to be so expensive that she had to borrow more than 190,000 roubles. In 1868 the estate was put up for auction and bought by Salomeya Akimova who in 1870 sold it to Gustav Frank. In 1889 countess Ekaterina Ignatyeva purchased the land and finally in the early 20th century it was sold to Major-General Count Mikhail Pavlovich Tolstoy.

Mikhail Pavlovich was a nephew of the 1812 war hero P. A. Tolstoy. He also was a hero of several wars himself, for example, he fought in the Russo-Turkish War of 1877–1878, defended the Shipka Pass and was honoured with the Order of St. George. Tolstoy commissioned Fyodor Lidval to build a profitable house, the project was approved by the client in March 1910.

Mikhail Pavlovich didn't see his house finished because he died in 1913 in Nice. The estate was inherited by his widow Olga Alexandrovna, née Vasilchikova.

=== Construction ===
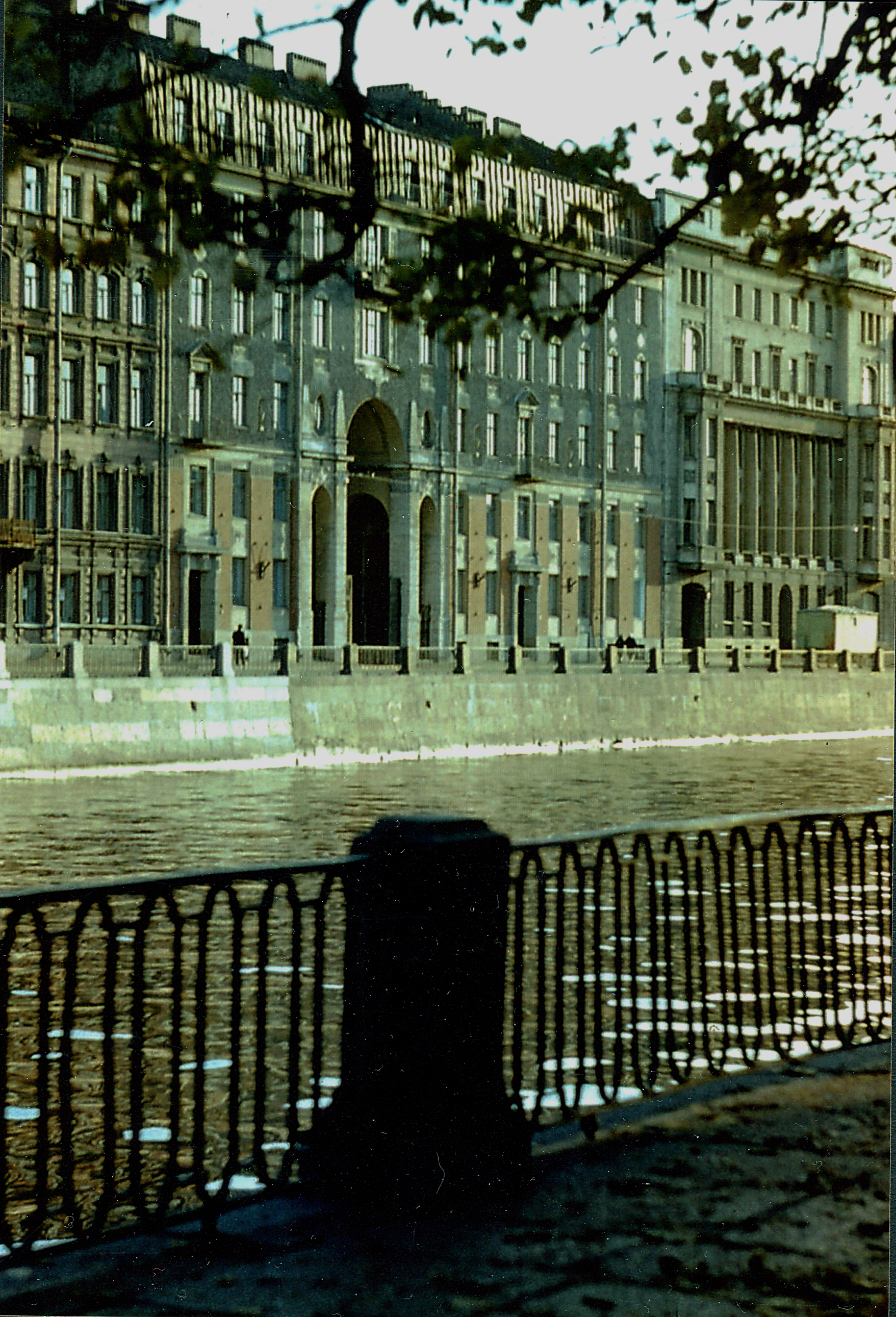
Tolstoy House, Fontanka Embankment view

Fyodor Lidval designed a building of an unusual shape with the interconnected inner yards. He decorated inner facades as richly as did the front ones. The lower floor walls were layered with red bricks, the upper one — with grey plastering. The decorative elements such as sandrics and arabesques were colored in yellow.

Decorating facades of the backyard in the same manner as the front ones was uncommon for Petersburg. Three interconnected yards that create an inner street are colloquially called the Street of Lidval. Prominent Russian art historian Boris Kirikov finds the Renaissance arches the most decorative part of the design. Made of limestone blocks, they are framed with pilasters and obelisks. Because of the irregular shape of the land, the inner street is angular and the yards open one after another, creating an unusual perspective effect. Lidval repeated this design in construction of the Nobel House on Lesnoy avenue, 20. According to his idea, the inner yards were to create the spirit of good-neighbourliness with a semi-private zone where the dwellers and the passers-by wouldn't be isolated from each other.

The structure was conceived as a home for all classes, with apartments for people of all incomes, from modest to luxurious. The building was provided with the most modern amenities, it had air conditioning, ventilation and extraction systems, plumbing, electricity, telephone line, garbage disposal, and 19 elevators. For steam heating, 10 coal fired boilers were installed in the basement. 16 laundries, several billiard rooms, and a gym were opened for the dwellers.

The building had 15 entrance halls, the 16th in the side wing was for personnel. Main staircases were decorated with mettlach tiles, patterned bars, and stained glass windows. The third entrance hall was for the budget rental studios usually rented by low-level clerks. The studios shared a hallway and restrooms, but each had its own kitchenette and a tiny alcove with washbasin. Before the 1917 Revolution, more than 1000 inhabitants lived in the Tolstoy house.

=== After the revolution ===
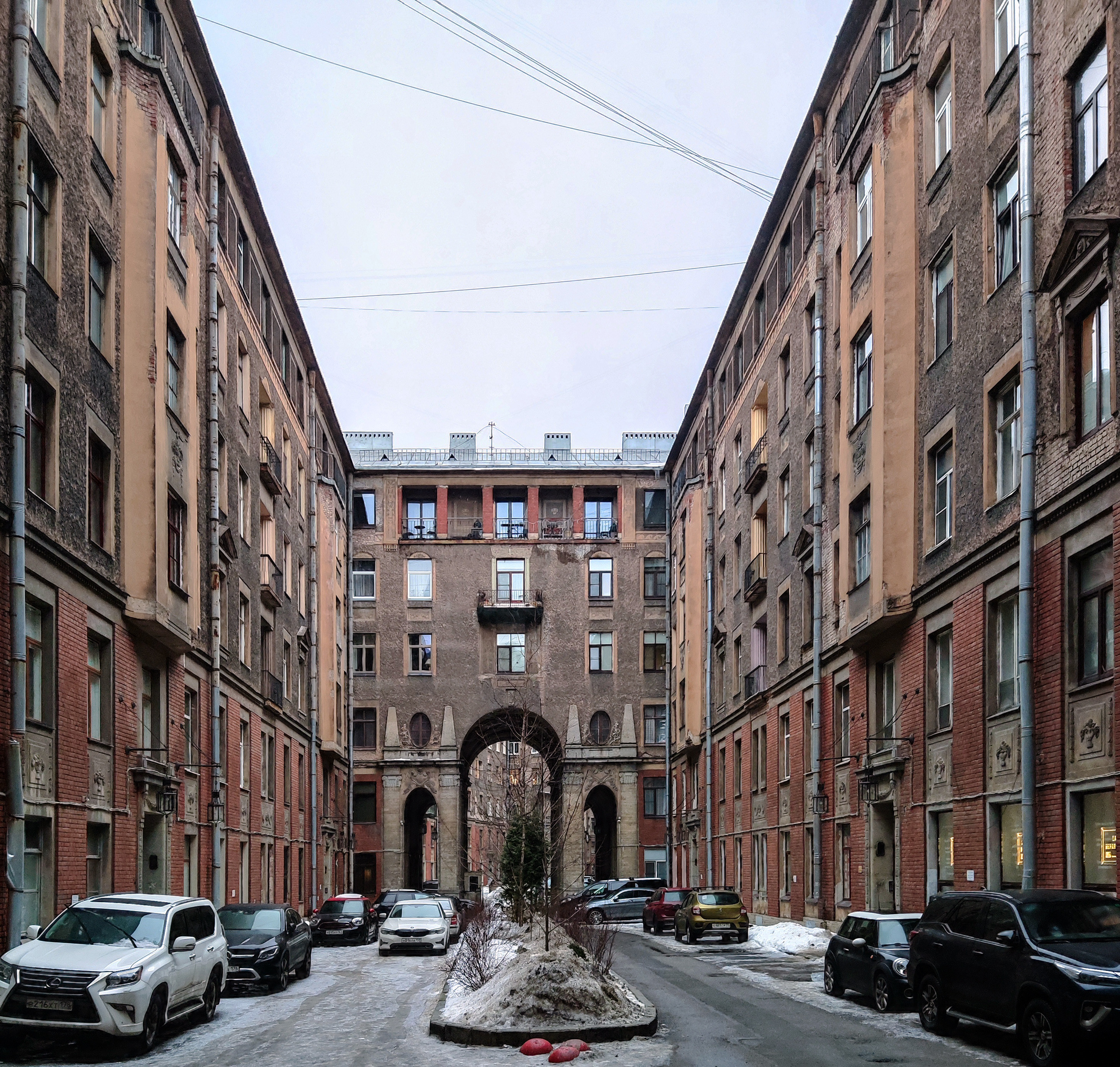
Tolstoy House, view from courtyard

The Russian Civil War forced many inhabitants of the Tolstoy house to leave their homes, many of them left abroad. Many apartments were deserted and could be taken by anyone. After 1918, the building was nationalized and the apartments were officially resettled as communal. On the contrary, some were repurposed as non-residential. For example, former apartment No. 108 was given to Nikolay Smolich theater studio.

During World War II apt. No 106 was used as a pillbox, the basements served as bombshelters. At least 17 residents were killed in battlefield, 329 died from hunger during the Siege of Leningrad.

After the war, the inner street was significantly altered: driveways were made, the lawns were planted with poplars, and a statue was installed in the fountain. Thus was lost Lidval's original concept of an internal street.

The Tolstoy House appeared as a setting in numerous Russian films. Most of Igor Maslennikov's 1985 film Winter Cherry takes place in the Tolstoy House, in its yards, or near it. In this film, the Tolstoy House serves as a kind of actor itself, playing up to the stars of the film and creating a certain mood. Maslennikov also used the Tolstoy House in his The Adventures of Sherlock Holmes and Dr. Watson series of television films to stand in for parts of Holmes's London. Other films using the Tolstoy House include A Doctor Called?, Could One Imagine?, Born of the Revolution, and Gangster Petersburg.

In 1987 more than 3000 residents lived in 327 apartments of the Tolstoy house. After the dissolution of the Soviet Union, many apartments were privatized, some were leased as offices.

In 1970 the building was designated an Architectural Monument of Regional Significance. In 1988 it became a part of UNESCO World Heritage Site number 540, Historic Centre of Saint Petersburg and Related Groups of Monuments. However, in 2008, after reducing the buffer zone, the status of the building has been downgraded to Zone Controlled Building.

== 21st century ==
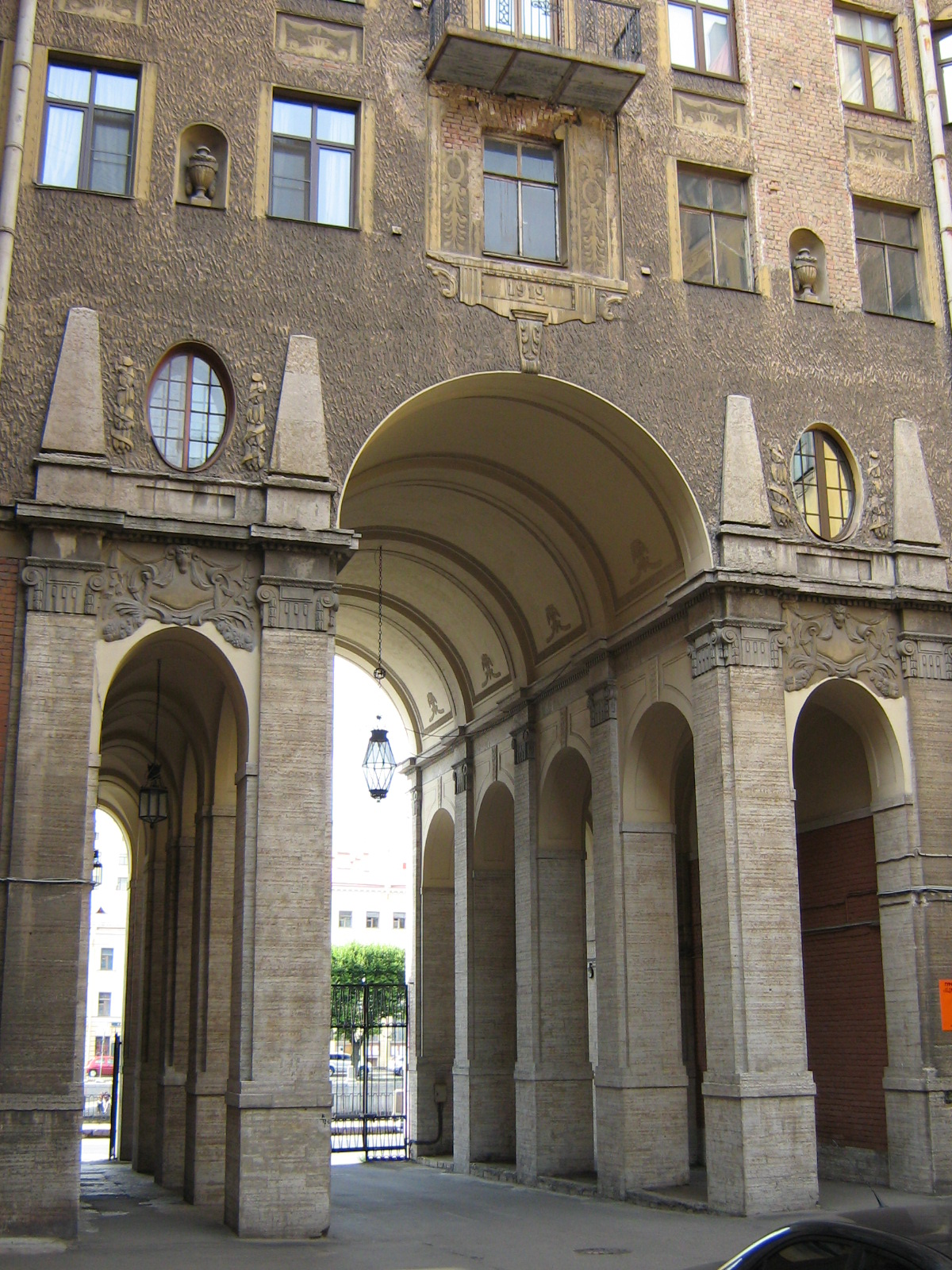
The archway, 2008

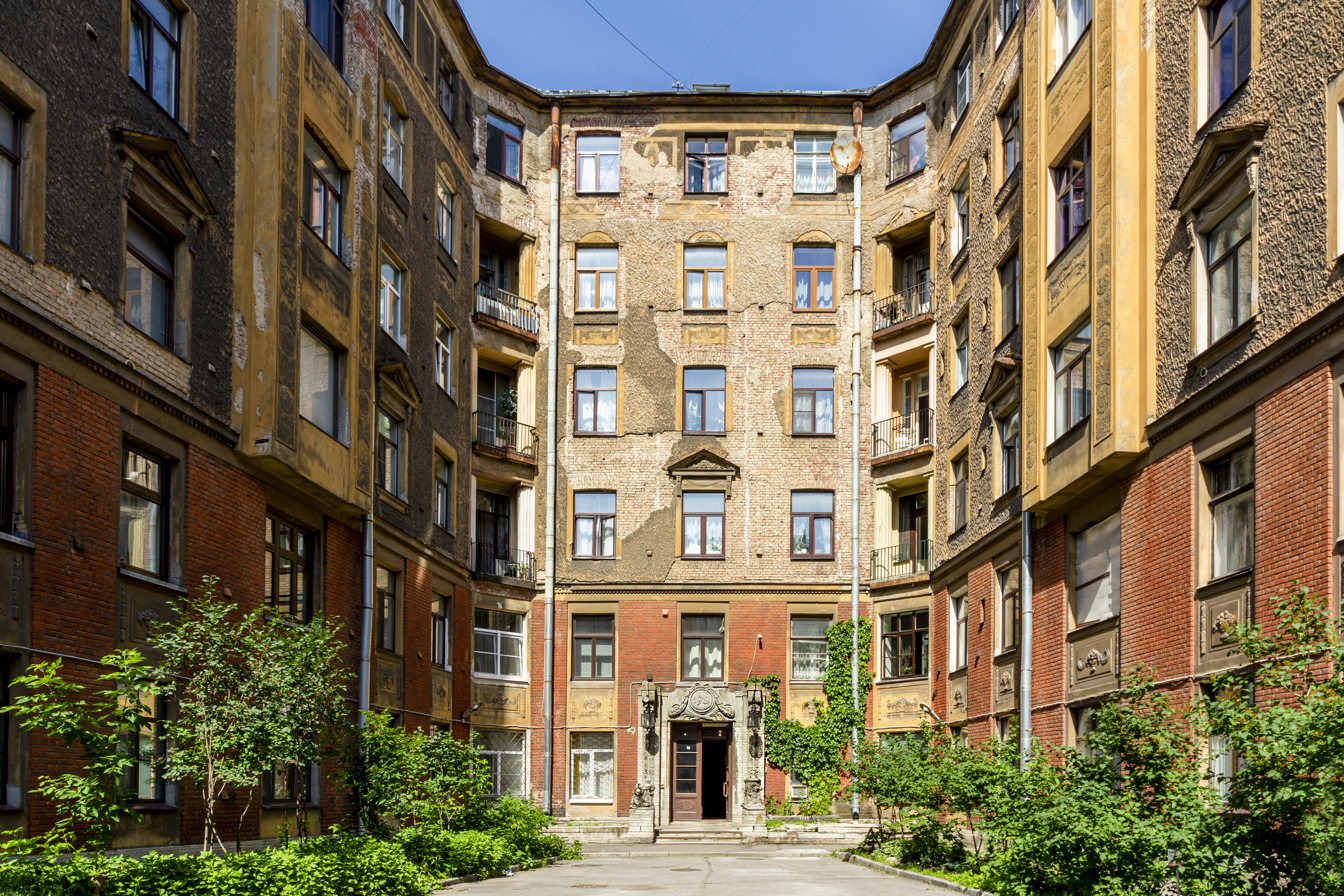
The inner yard, 2020

By 2013, 300 apartments were registered in the building.

By 2016, the wear and tear of the structure was estimated 40%, however the outside decorations and utilities were in a poor state. Some sculptures were restored in 2012.

In 2021 a museum dedicated to all residents of the house was opened in the basement.

== Famous residents ==
=== Past residents ===
- Aleksandr Kuprin (1870–1938), writer. Trained at the "Sanitas" athletic club located in the building, and may have lived in the building.
- Alexander Spiridovich (1873–1952), Major General, Chief of the Imperial Palace Guards. After the October Revolution he went into exile, where he wrote several books of memoirs and studies of Russian political parties. He died in New York City.
- Arkady Averchenko, writer, satirist and a theater critic. Averchenko lived in the building in the years 1914-1917, in apartment 203.
- Sergey Varun-Sekret (1868-1962) lived in the apt. № 157 in 1912-1917.
- Ludvig Chaplinsy, a famous weightlifter, lived in the Tolstoy house before 1917.
- Count Mikhail Andronikov lived in apt. № 359 in 1912-1916. He was ill-reputed for his frequent loud parties and sketchy acquaintances. Grigori Rasputin was a frequent guest of Andronikov's home, one of assassination attempts on him took place in Tolstoy house. Count Andronikov was evicted from the building in 1916 by order of landlady Olga Tolstaya.
- Alexander Belosludtsev (1961–2004), painter, graphic designer, and photographer, editor of a six-volume collected works of Anna Akhmatova.
- Boris Z. Kraychik (born 1928; deceased), engineer and writer, author of the children's book What Happened at the Hermitage, friend of Igor S. Kon and S. D. Dovlatov.
- Samuil Alyansky (1891–1984), owner and editor of the Symbolist publishing house Alkonost.
- Yevgeny Rein (born 1935) poet and disciple of Anna Akhmatova who was included in the 1960s group "Akhmatova's Orphans". Members of his circle who visited him at Tolstoy House included Akhmatova, D. Monakhov, V. Britanishsky, S. Dovlatov, J. Brodsky, A.Naiman, G. Gorbovsky, and A. Kushner.
- Ekaterina Panzhenskij (1984–2009), designer and photographer. She created a series of photographs of the Tolstoy House, many portraits of artists and musicians (e.g. Nikas Safronov, M. S. Vspyshkin), and several book covers. She lived in apartment 263.
- Galina Kremshevskaya (Saint George-Kremshevskaya) (1912–1996), dancer and ballet critic, wife of Michael S. George. Author of books on the Vaganova Academy of Russian Ballet (which she attended) and the outstanding ballerinas T. M. Vecheslovoy and N. M. Dudinskaya.
- Mariss Jansons (1943–2019), conductor.
- M. B. Polyakin, violinist and educator, lived in the house in the years 1928-1936.
- Mikhail Manevich, vice-governor of St. Petersburg (1996–1997). Lived in the building until his murder in 1997.
- Dmitry Matveevich Pozdneev, a professor, Orientalis, and collector, resided in apt. 660. Pozdneev was an uncle of Mikhail Bulgakov and became a protagonist of Woland in The Master and Margarita.
- P.M. Benyash (1914–1986), Soviet-era drama and theater critic.
- Prince Mikhail Mikhailovich Andronicus (1875–1919), famous adventurer and member of Rasputin's circle. He was evicted from the Tolstoy House in 1916 by court decision following a lawsuit by the landlady (Countess Tolstoy), who did not like Rasputin and his followers visiting the building.
- Puryshev Arkady Konstantinovich, hereditary honorary citizen, businessman, monarchist, prominent collector. His wife and daughter were members of the Union of Russian Women. According to the memoirs of his adopted grandson (son of his stepson), the writer L. Panteleyev, he lived in the Tolstoy House.
- S. G. Kalmanovich (1947–2009), businessman and sports manager.
- Tatyana I. Satz (Kolesnikova) (born 1964), world-class gymnast, coach of the Leningrad gymnasts (1984–1990). Silver medalist of the world, two-time champion of the USSR, five-time champion of Leningrad. Lived in Tolstoy House in the 1990s.
- Vasily Knyazev (1887–1937), poet and revolutionary. A writer of satirical topical poems and author of the lyrics to the song March of the Commune (chorus: "Never, never, never, never will we be slaves to the commune...", inspired by the lyrics of the British anthem Rule, Britannia!). Before his arrest he lived in apartment 301.
- Vladimir G. Garshin (1887–1974), professor, pathologist, academician of the Academy of Medical Sciences (1945), a nephew of Vsevolod Garshin and a friend of Anna Akhmatova. He lived in apartment number 459 during the Siege of Leningrad, as the chief pathologist of Leningrad.
- Zoya Petrovna Samoletova (1930–1999), twice member of the Supreme Soviet, member of the Council of the Union, seamstress and Brigadier of the Bolshevichka garment production association. Lived in the Tolstoy House in the 1940s and 1950s.
- Eduard Khil, singer most famously known for appearing in the "Trololo" video, which was recorded in 1968 and later went viral in 2009. Khil lived in the Tolstoy house from 1980 till 2012.

=== Recent and current residents ===
- Andrey Petrovich Gagarin (1934—2011), doctor of technical sciences, professor at STU, a descendant of the princes Gagarin and chairman of the St. Petersburg branch of the provincial nobility.
- Bella Moiseyevna Kupsina, producer for Alexander Rosenbaum.
- Irina Kolpakova (born 1935), ballerina. She has been active in the effort to preserve the historical appearance of the Tolstoy House.
- V. G. Semyonov (born 1932), dancer, teacher, People's Artist of the USSR. He lives with his wife Irina Kolpakova in the Tolstoy House.
- Vladimir Kehman, director of the Mikhaylovsky Theatre.
- Vladimir Kiselev, producer of the band Zemlyane.

== Literature ==
- Axelrod, V.; Mankova-Sugorovskaya, A. (2021). Улица Рубинштейна и вокруг нее. Графский и Щербаков переулки [Rubinstein Street and surroundings, Graphsky and Scherbakov lanes] (in Russian). St. Petersburg: Tsentrpoligraph. ISBN 978-5-227-09600-5.
- Chukina, E. (2012). Свернем в огромную готическую арку... [Let's turn into a huge gothic arch]. Nevskoe Vremya (in Russian).
- Dubin, A. S. (2004). Моховая улица [Mokhovaya street] (in Russian). Центрполиграф. p. 97. ISBN 9785952410312.
- Isachenko, V. G. (2002). Архитектура Санкт-Петербурга [Architecture of St. Petersburg] (in Russian). Paritet. ISBN 5-93437-125-8.
- Kirikov, Boris (2014). Architecture of Art Nouveau in Saint Petersburg. Estates and Tenement Houses (in Russian). Saint Petersburg: Kolo. pp. 465–474. ISBN 978-5-4462-0044-3.
- Kolotilo, M. N. (2011). V. G. Smirnov-Volkhovsky (ed.). Толстовский дом: созвездие имён [Tolstoy House: a constellation of names] (in Russian). Iskusstvo Rossii. ISBN 978-5-98361-155-9.
- Kolotilo, M. N. (2013). Толстовский дом [Tolstoy House] (PDF) (in Russian). St. Petersburg: Iskusstvo Rossii. p. 552. ISBN 978-5-98361-186-3.
- Milenko, V. D. (2021). Судьба последней петербургской квартиры А. Т. Аверченко в Толстовском доме: новые факты [The fate of the last St. Petersburg apartment of A. T. Averchenko in the Tolstoy House: new facts]. Humanitarian Paradigm. 2 (17): 143–160.
- Poda, V. Y. (2021). Где бьется сердце Петербурга? Доходные дома в историях и фотографиях [Where does the heart of St. Petersburg beat? Tenement houses in stories and photos]. Bombora. ISBN 978-5-04-114213-1.
- Сегодня в нашем городе [Today in our city]. Vecherniy Leningrad. 1987.
