= Rubinstein Street (Saint Petersburg) =

Street in Saint Petersburg, Russia

Rubinstein street
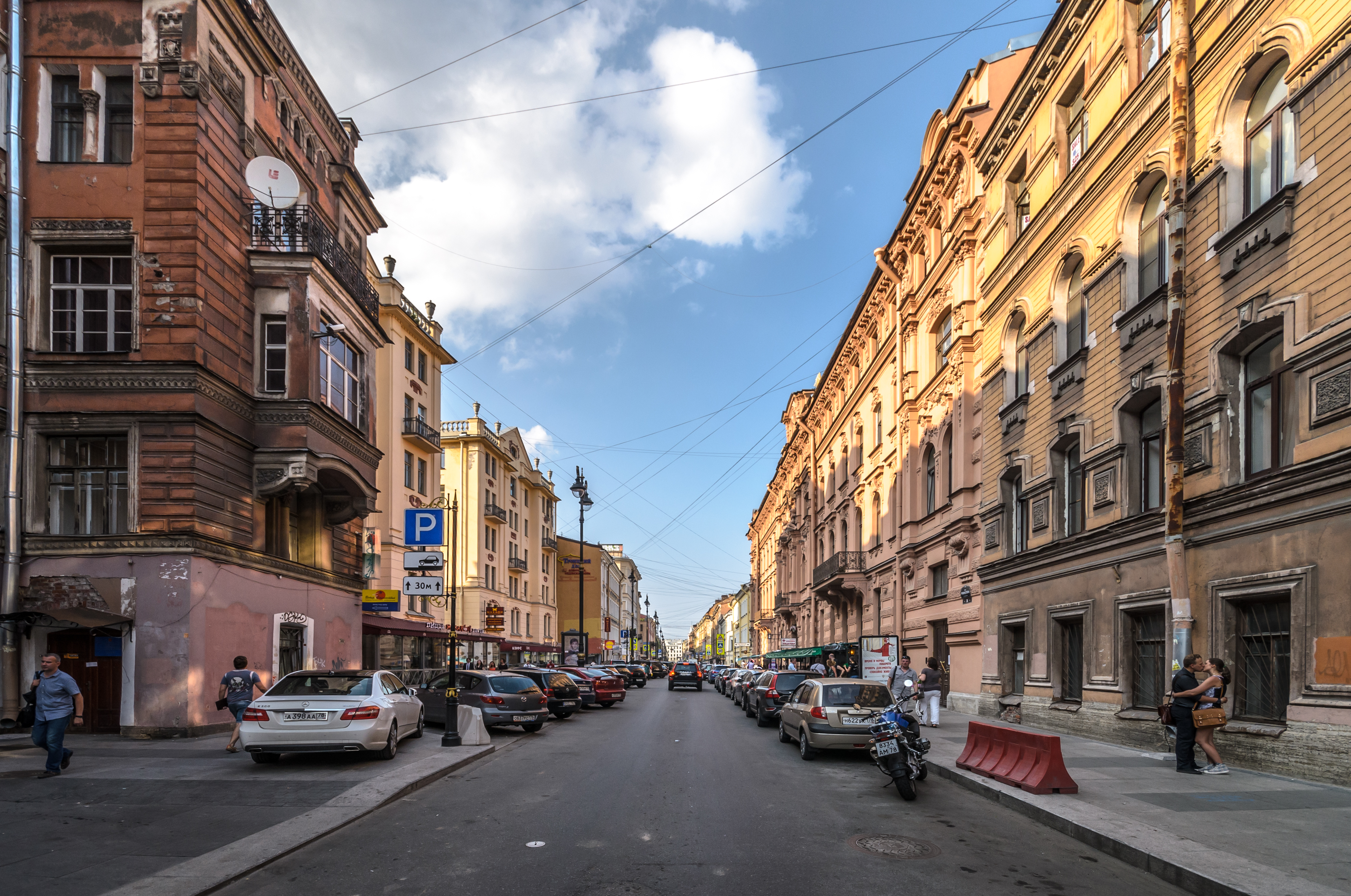
- Native name: Улица Рубинштейна (Russian) (since 1929)
- Nearest metro station: Vladimirskaya, Dostoyevskaya

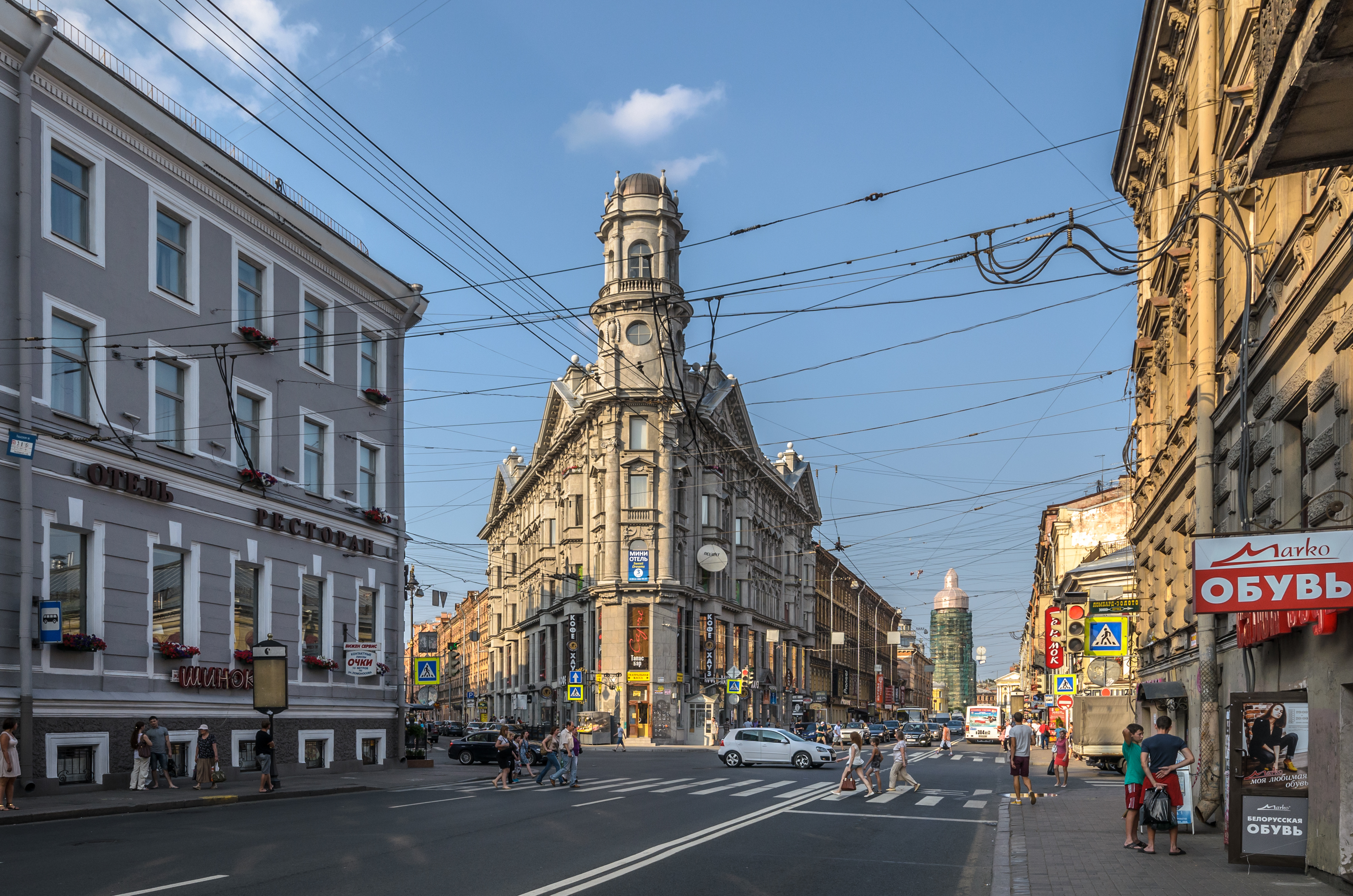
'Five Corners' crossroad, 2014

The Rubinstein Street is a street in Saint Petersburg, Russia. It runs from Nevsky Prospect to Zagorodny prospect. Since the 2000s it became famous as the main restaurant and bar street in the city, a centre of Petersburg social life.

== History ==
The street's history goes back to the 1740s. At that time it was called Golovkin lane after Chancellor Gavriil Golovkin, whose country residence was located nearby. The modern name was given in 1929 in honour of composer Anton Rubinstein, who resided in the house No. 38.

== Landmarks ==
- Five Corners — a crossroad, formed by the intersection of Rubinsteina Street with Zagorodny Prospekt (Zagorodny Avenue), Razyezzhaya Street, and Lomonosova Street (formerly Chernyshev Lane).
- No. 7 — the so-called "Tear of Socialism". The avant-garde house was built in 1929—1931 as a commune, following the idea of collective household. Soviet poet Olga Bergholz was its most famous resident.
- No. 13 — the Leningrad Rock Club, opened in 1981.
- No. 15-17 — the Tolstoy House, designed by Fyodor Lidval and built in 1910–1912.
- No. 18 — the Maly Drama Theatre.
- No. 23 — designed by architect A. A. Basryshnikov and built in 1911-1912. Here in 1921-1935 lived writer and scientist Ivan Yefremov, in the 1960s-1970s — writer Sergei Dovlatov. After 1922 comedian Arkady Raikin lived here with his family.
- No. 40 — former Ioffe revenue house, 1913. The flatiron building with decorative tower serves as an architectural dominant of the square.

== Links ==
- Video about Ioffe revenue house (Rubinstein st., 40), ru
- Video about dining on Rubinstein st., en
