= Irina Kolpakova =

Russian ballerina (born 1933)

- Born: Irina Aleksandrovna Kolpakova; 22 May 1933 (age 91); Leningrad, RSFSR, Soviet Union
- Occupation(s): Ballerina, choreographer, pedagogue

Irina Aleksandrovna Kolpakova (Russian: Ирина Александровна Колпакова; born 22 May 1933) is a Soviet and Russian ballerina, choreographer and pedagogue. People's Artist of the USSR (1965) and Hero of Socialist Labour (1983).

== Biography ==
She was the prima ballerina of the Kirov State Academic Theatre of Opera and Ballet (now the Mariinsky Theatre) in Saint Petersburg. From 1974 to 1979, she served as a deputy of the Supreme Soviet of the Soviet Union.

In the 1990s, she worked for several seasons as choreographer and coach at the American Ballet Theatre in New York City. She is currently a professor of classical dance at the Vaganova Academy of Russian Ballet in Saint Petersburg and a ballet coach at American Ballet Theatre.

She is married to the noted ballet dancer Vladilen Semyonov, also a People's Artist of the USSR. They live in the Tolstoy House building in Saint Petersburg.

== Awards and honors ==
- Honored Artist of the RSFSR (1957)
- People's Artist of the RSFSR (1960)
- People's Artist of the USSR (1965)
- Two Orders of the Red Banner of Labour (1967, 1971)
- USSR State Prize (1980)
- Order of Lenin (1983)
- Hero of Socialist Labour (1983)

== See also ==
- List of Russian ballet dancers
