= Dmitry Bobyshev =

Russian poet and translator (born 1936)

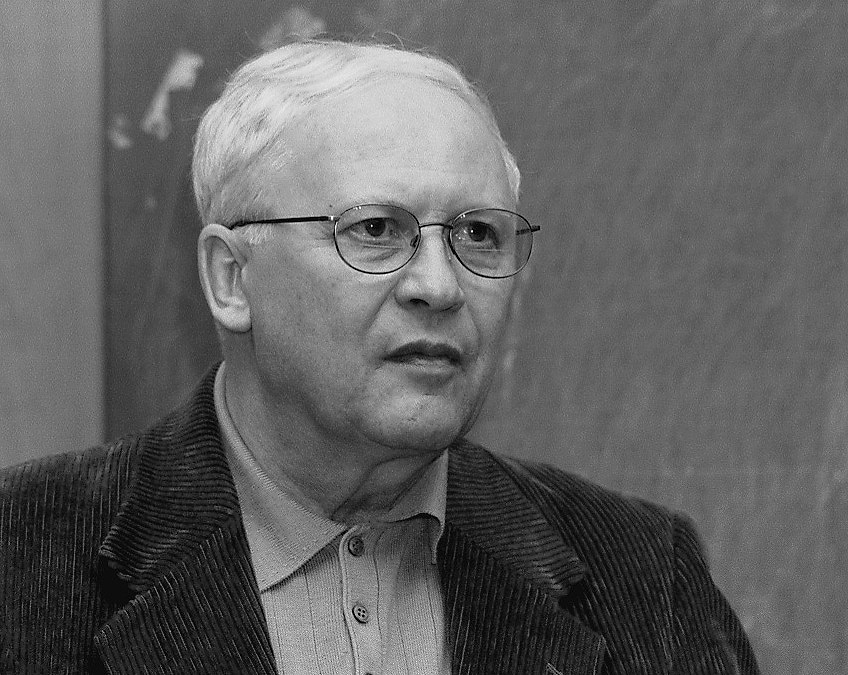

Dmitry Vasilyevich Bobyshev (Russian: Дми́трий Васи́льевич Бо́бышев; born 11 April 1936) is a Russian poet, translator and literary critic.

== Biography ==
Dmitry Bobyshev was born on 11 April 1936 in Mariupol. From his childhood he lived in Leningrad. During the Siege of Leningrad, Bobyshev's father died, and after the war he was adopted by his stepfather. In 1959 he graduated from the Leningrad Institute of Technology. He worked for 10 years as an engineer for chemical equipment. Later, he became an editor on television.

Bobyshev started to write poetry in the mid-1950s. His poems were published in samizdat (including Alexander Ginzburg's journal Syntax"). In the early 1960s, along with Joseph Brodsky, Anatoly Naiman, Yevgeny Rein, Bobyshev entered the inner circle of Anna Akhmatova. Bobyshev's first book of poems, Hiatus, was published in 1979 in Paris.

In 1979, Bobyshev emigrated to the United States, where he taught Russian language and literature. In 1983, he became a US citizen. As of 2025, he is professor emeritus at the University of Illinois at Urbana-Champaign.

== Writing ==
Bobyshev is the author of six books of poetry, a number of poetry translations (modern American poetry) and volumes of prose memoir, I am here (2003). Among the circle of Akhmatova, Bobyshev stands apart aesthetically. While, like Brodsky, he is rooted in a century and a half of Russian poetic tradition, Bobyshev chooses more radical manifestations of this tradition. The literary critic Barbara Heldt describes him as "the first Leningrad-Milwaukee poet", identifying him as transitioning from the poetic traditions of Imperial Russia to those of the American midwest.

== Books ==
=== Poetry ===
- Zijanija (Chasms) (Russian: Зияния: Стихи). — Paris: YMCA-press, 1979
- The Beasts of St. Anthony (Russian: Звери Св. Антония: Бестиарий). — New York: Apollon Foundation, 1989
- Russian Terza Rima and Other Poems (Русские терцины и другие стихотворения) — St. Petersburg: Vsemirnoe Slovo, 1992
- Fullness of Everything (Полнота всего) — St. Petersburg: Vodolej, 1992. ISBN 5-87852-004-4
- Angels and Powers (Ангелы и силы) — New York: Slovo/Word, 1997
- Familiarities Between Words (Знакомства слов: Избранные стихи) — Moscow: New Literary Review, 2003.
- Burning Bush (Жар-Куст) — Paris: Editions de Montmartre, 2003
- Ода воздухоплаванию: Стихи последних лет. — Мoscow: Время, 2007. ISBN 978-5-9691-0238-5
- Чувство огромности. — Frankfurt am Main: Литературный европеец, 2017
- Петербургские небожители. — New York, Liberty Publishing House, 2020
- Февраль на Таврической улице. Книга ранних стихов. — St. Petersburg: Пальмира, 2021.

=== Memoir ===
- I Am Here (Я здесь. Человекотекст) — Мoscow: Vagrius, 2003
- Self Portrait in Faces (Автопортрет в лицах. Человекотекст, книга вторая) — Мoscow: Время, 2008. ISBN 978-5-9691-0357-3
