= Akhmatova's Orphans =

Group of twentieth-century Russian poets

Akhmatova's Orphans (Russian: Ахматовские сироты, romanized: Akhmatovskiye siroty) was a group of four twentieth-century Russian poets from Leningrad — namely Joseph Brodsky (1940–1996), Yevgeny Rein (b. 1935), Anatoly Naiman (1936–2022), and Dmitri Bobyshev (b. 1936) — who gathered as acolytes around the poet Anna Akhmatova (1889–1966). Akhmatova called them her "magic choir", but after her death they became known as her "orphans", a term which was coined by Bobyshev himself. Nayman had also worked as a secretary for Akhmatova and a collaborator to her translations. Their style has been defined as "neo-Acmeist", with distinct traits from the authors of the early movement.

In 2024, filmmaker and Russian-literature scholar Yuri Leving directed a film focusing on the quartet, titled Akhmatova's Orphans: Disassembly.
