= A Foreign Woman =

Novel by Sergei Dovlatov

A Foreign Woman (Russian: Иностранка) is a novel by the Russian writer Sergei Dovlatov. It is the author's first book about life in the United States of America.

== Plot introduction ==
The story is set in New York City in the 1980s and begins with a description of the narrator's neighbourhood and the Russian immigrants who live there. It then moves back in time and over to the Soviet Union to describe a young woman called Marusia Tatarovich who, in time, emigrates to the United States.

== Publication history ==
The book was published in New York by Russica Publishers in 1986.
