= Yevgeny Rein =

Russian poet and writer

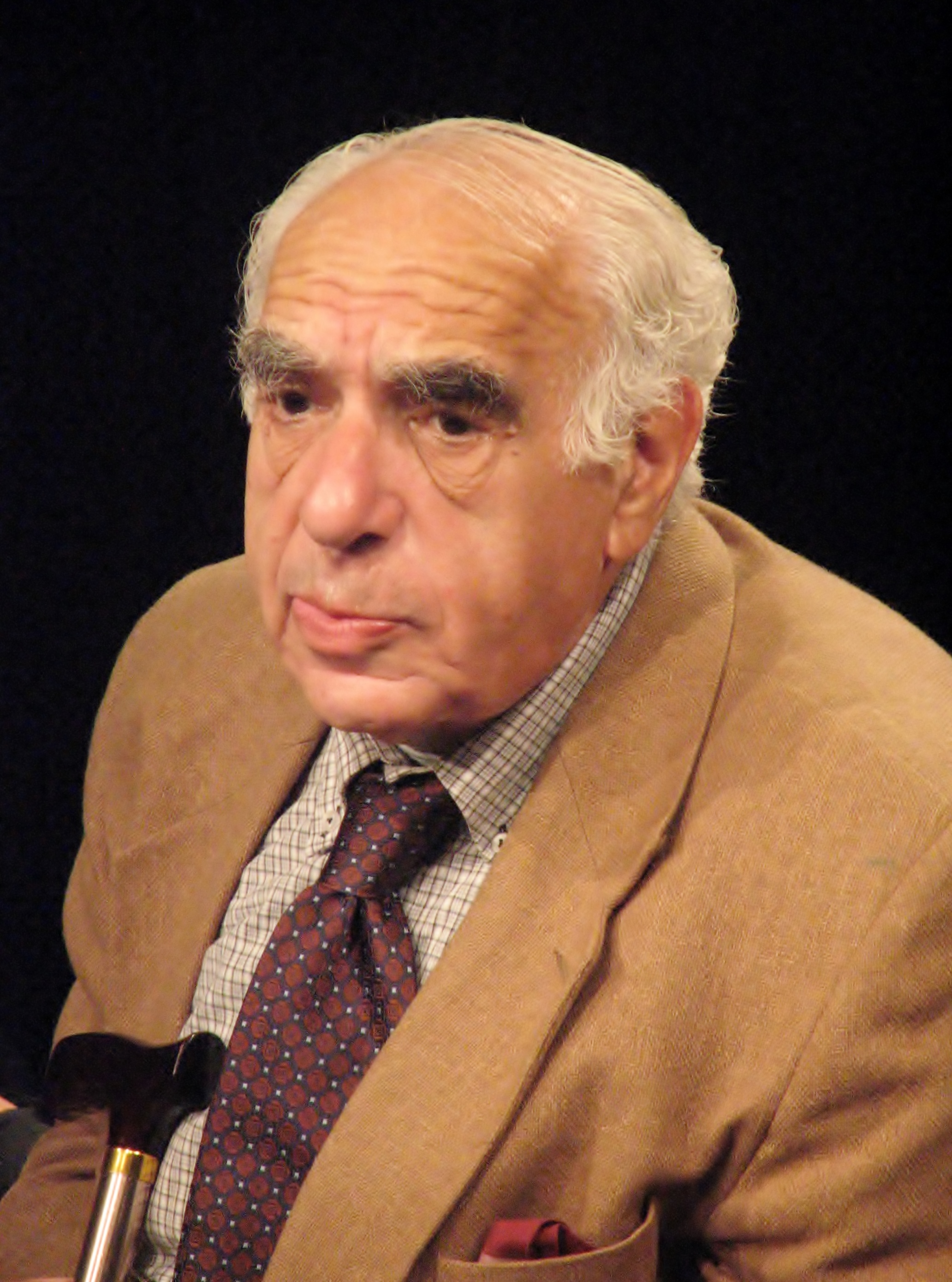
- Rein in 2013
- Born: Yevgeny Borisovich Rein; December 29, 1935 (age 90) Leningrad, Russian SFSR, Soviet Union

Yevgeny Borisovich Rein (Russian: Евге́ний Бори́сович Рейн; born 29 December 1935 in Leningrad, now Saint Petersburg) is a Russian poet and writer, laureate of the State Prize of the Russian Federation (1997). His poetry won the Pushkin Prize of Russia, Tsarskoe Selo Art Prize (1997), or the Russian National Prize - the Poet (2012).

In 1960s, along with Joseph Brodsky, Dmitri Bobyshev, and Anatoly Naiman, he was one of the Akhmatova's Orphans, a well-known poetic group from Leningrad. Since 1979 Rein participated in the publication of "Metropol" almanac. His poems were published in samizdat and Soviet underground papers.

His first book was published in 1984 (The Names of Bridges) after a "careful" censorship. A well-known poet and free-thinker, the elder friend of Joseph Brodsky and Sergei Dovlatov, he became a member of Russian Writer's Union only in 1987, during perestroika.

Rein now lives in Moscow. He teaches at the Department of Literary Creativity at the Gorky Literary Institute.

In February 2022, Rein has signed the public letter from Russian writers in support of the Russian invasion of Ukraine.

== Books ==
- Selected poems (preface by J. Brodsky, V. Kulle, M., SPb, 2001
- It's boring without Dovlatov, SPb, 1997
