= Grand Hotel Europe =

Five-star hotel in Saint Petersburg, Russia

Coordinates: 59.935661°N 30.330355°E

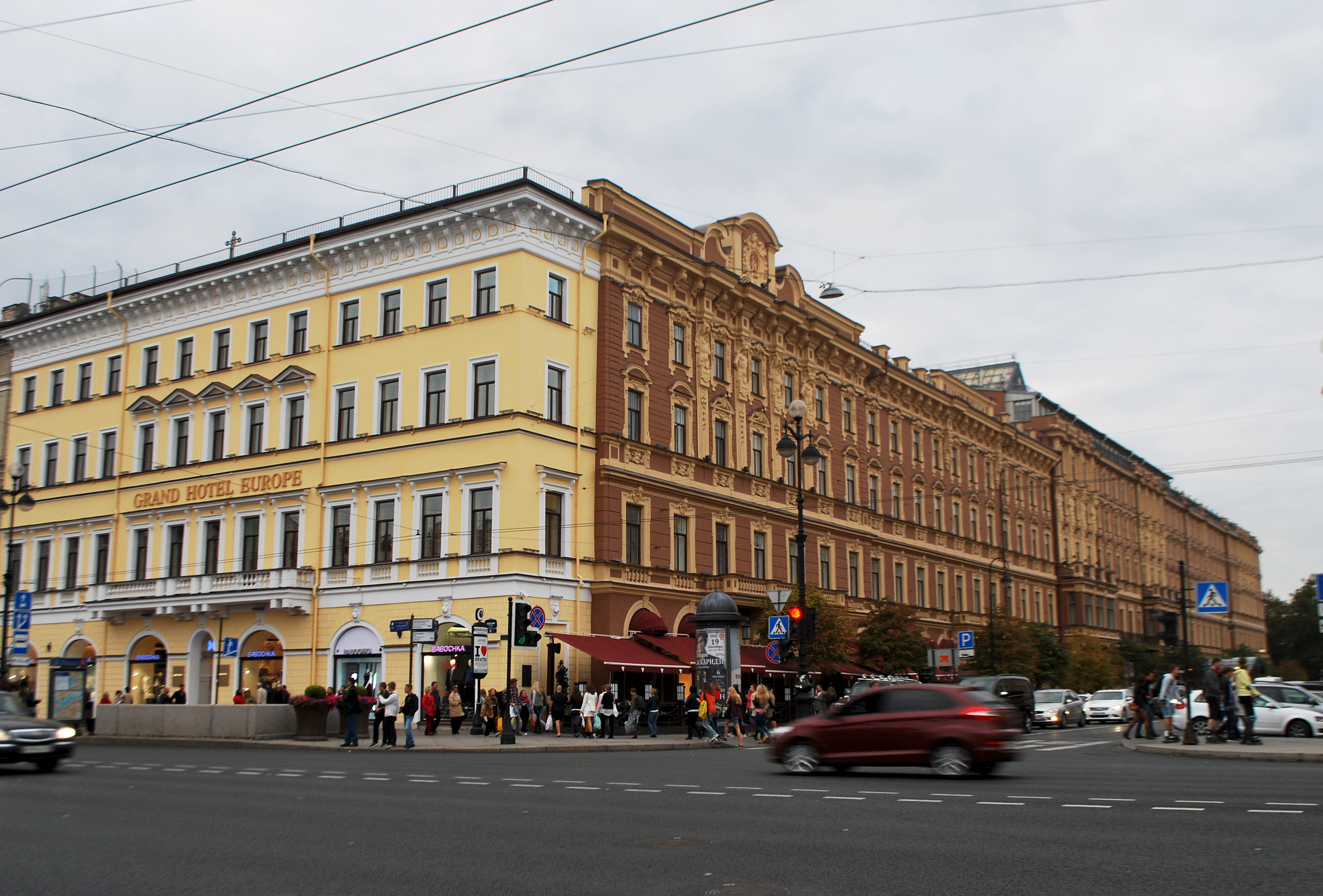

General information
- Type: Hotel
- Location: Saint Petersburg, Russia
- Opened: 9 February 1875

Height
- Architectural: Art Nouveau

Design and construction
- Architects: Ludwig Fontana; Fyodor Lidval; Leon Benois

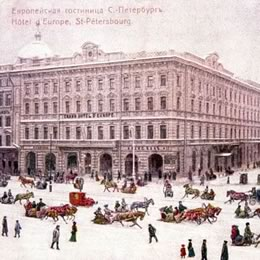
The hotel is situated at the intersection of Nevsky Prospekt and Mikhailovskaya Street.

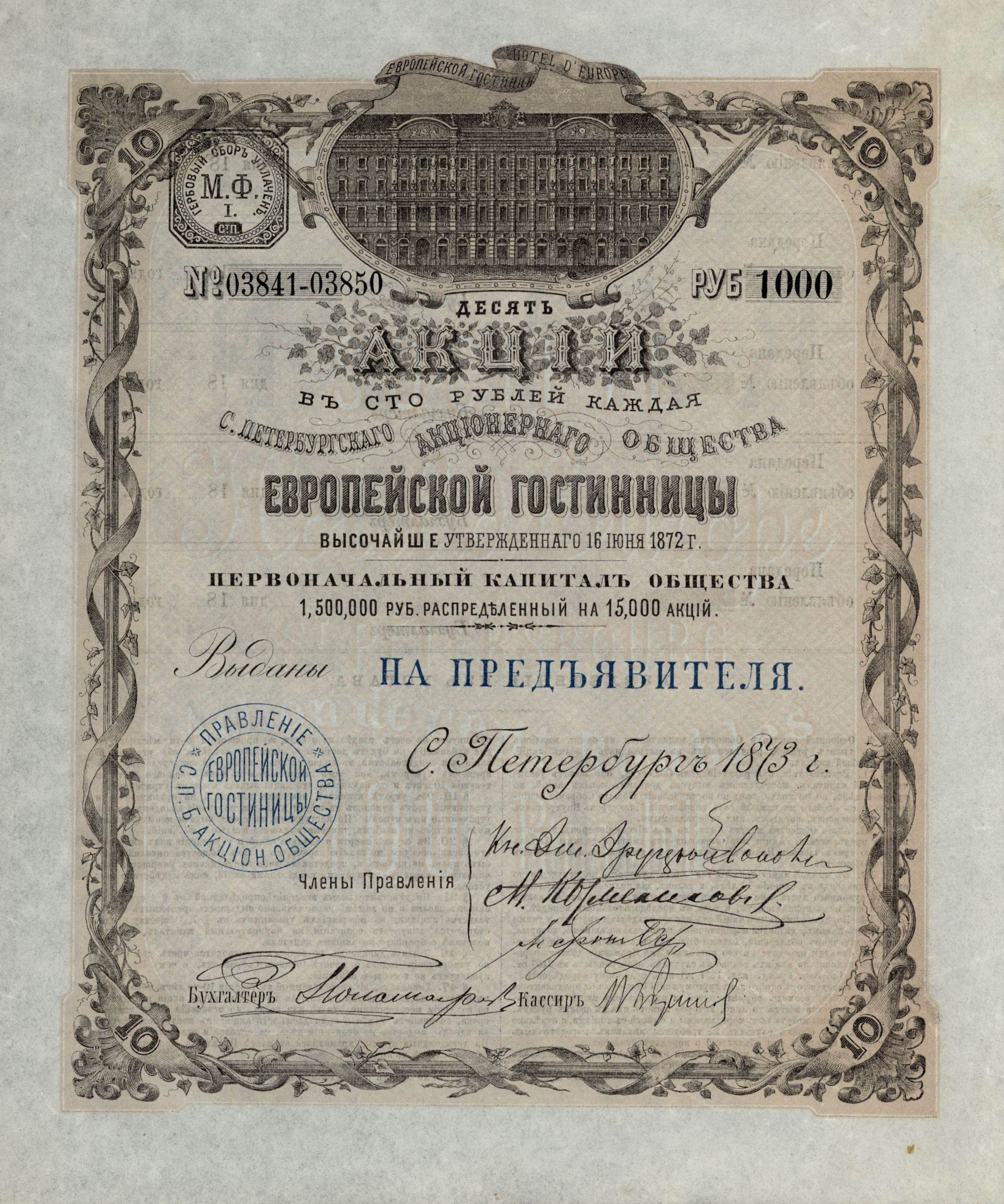
Share of the St. Petersburg company "Hotel Europe", issued 1873

The Grand Hotel Europe (Russian: Гранд Отель Европа) is a historic five-star luxury hotel on Nevsky Prospect in Saint Petersburg, Russia.

== History ==
The Grand Hotel d'Europe was built from 1873 to 1875, to designs by Swiss/Russian architect Ludwig Fontana. It opened on 9 February 1875. The hotel's opening is often listed as 28 January 1875, because Russia was still using the Julian calendar at the time, which was 12 days behind the Gregorian calendar used in the rest of the world. The hotel's interiors were remodeled by architect Fyodor Lidval from 1907 to 1914 in the Art Nouveau style. Additional work was done at this time by Leon Benois, including a notable decorative stained glass window and ceiling in the dining room. During the Soviet period, the hotel was known as the Hotel Evropeiskaya.

The hotel closed on 5 January 1989 for a complete restoration by a Soviet/Swedish joint venture, overseen by architect Viktoria Struzman. It reopened on 21 December 1991, managed by the Swedish Reso Hotels chain as the Reso Grand Hotel Europe, with a grand opening celebration following on 5 January 1992. On 1 November 1995, the German Kempinski chain took over management, and the hotel became the Grand Hotel Europe. On 10 February 2005, Orient-Express Hotels purchased the hotel for $85 million and took over management. In 2014, Orient-Express Hotels was renamed Belmond Ltd. and the hotel became the Belmond Grand Hotel Europe. Belmond ceased operating the hotel in 2023.

== Famous guests ==
- Pyotr Tchaikovsky
- Anna Pavlova
- Fyodor Dostoevsky
- Dmitri Shostakovich
- Claude Debussy (1913)
- Igor Stravinsky (1962)
- Luciano Pavarotti (2004)
- Elton John
- Bill Clinton
