= Affiliate (novel) =

1987 novel by Sergei Dovlatov

- Author: Sergei Dovlatov
- Language: Russian
- Published: 1990
- Publisher: Слово (Word)

Affiliate (Notes of a Radio Presenter) (Russian: Филиал (Записки ведущего)) is a novel by the Russian writer Sergei Dovlatov. It was written in November 1987 in New York.

== Plot introduction ==
The story is set in New York City in the 1980s, and then moves to Los Angeles. It is told in the first person by a man called Dalmatov, seemingly loosely based on Dovlatov himself: he is an immigrant from Russia, and an unsuccessful writer, working for the American-based Russian-language press.

Dalmatov presents a programme in Russian on the radio, and is sent to Los Angeles to report on a conference of Soviet dissidents. When he arrives, he bumps into his first love, Tasya, and the memories of their courtship when they both lived in the Soviet Union come flooding back.

== Analysis ==
The story is told in episodic form, in a style reminiscent of aphorisms. Present day events are interspersed with flashbacks from the narrator's youth. There is a heavy emphasis on the absurd, and how it can bring levity to depressing reality.

== Publication history ==
The book was published in Zvezda magazine in 1989 and then published in New York by publishing house Слово (Word) in 1990.
