= Fyodor Lidval =

Russian-Swedish architect (1870–1945)

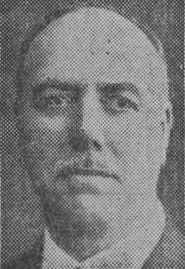
Fyodor Lidval late in life.

Fyodor Ivanovich Lidval (Russian: Фёдор Иванович Лидваль, Swedish: Johan Fredrik Lidvall; June 13 [O.S. June 1] 1870 – 1945) was a Russian-Swedish architect.

== Life ==
Lidvall was born in St. Petersburg into a family of Swedes. In 1882 he attended elementary school at the Swedish Church of St. Catherine, and then the second Petersburg Technical High School in 1888. For two years he worked in Baron Stieglitz's School of Technical Drawing.

From 1890 to 1896 Lidvall was a student in the architectural department of the St. Petersburg Academy of Arts, studying (1894–1896) in the workshop of the eminent architect Leon Benois. He graduated from the Academy of Fine Arts in 1896 with the title "Artist-Architect".

From 1909 he was a member of the Academy of Architecture, an arm of the Imperial Academy of Arts.

In 1917, ruined by the revolution, he was forced to emigrate to his family in Stockholm, ending the most fruitful period of his work which is connected with St. Petersburg, although he designed several buildings in Stockholm .

In Stockholm, Lidvall worked as an architect. He mainly constructed apartment buildings, but also the head office for Shell in Stockholm.

He died in 1945 and is buried in Stockholm in Djursholm Cemetery.

== Works ==
Lidvall began to play a significant role in the architecture of St. Petersburg in the first decade of the Twentieth Century. At the beginning of his career, he was a typical follower of the prevailing Modernist style.

One of his early works was an apartment building of the type called in Russia a "finance house", on Kamennoostrov Prospect in St Petersburg, begun in 1899 and completed in 1904. The structure was also known as the "Lidval House" as he received the commission from his mother, Ida Amalia Lidval. This building, with its Gothic windows, abundance of decorative elements, and different colors and textures, is often cited as a model of its style. Lidvall himself lived in this house until his exile in 1918.

He designed the Azov-Don Commercial Bank Building in St. Petersburg (1907–1813), already showing his characteristic restraint and use of classical elements (the center of the building includes a portico with columns). Lidvall also built structures for the Azov-Don Commercial Bank in Moscow, Astrakhan, Kiev, and Kharkiv.

The second decade of the Twentieth Century began Lidval's creative heyday. During these years he designed a house for Alfred Nobel, the Tolstoy House on Trinity Street (now St. Rubenstein Street) with another facade overlooking the Fontanka Embankment, and many other buildings. Included among these was the six-storey Hotel Astoria, which opened in 1912 and was one of the most luxurious hotels in the Russian Empire. He designed (with his mentor Leon Benois) the Art Nouveau redesign of the Grand Hotel Europe, which had been opened in 1875. Both the Hotel Astoria and Grand Hotel Europe are open to this day as five-star hotels.

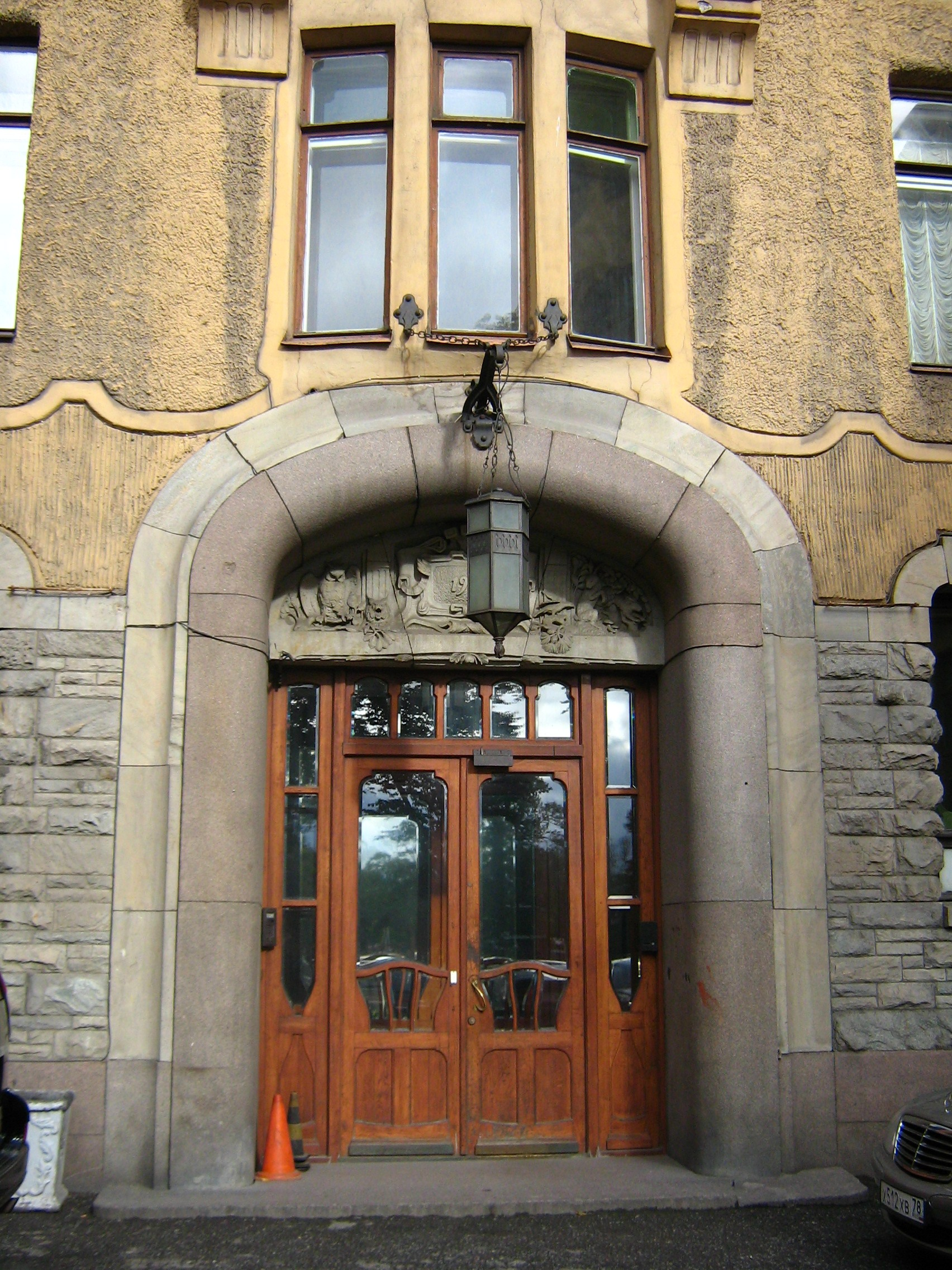
Entrance to Lidval House

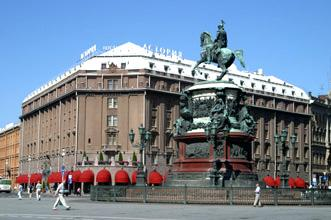
Lidval's Astoria Hotel

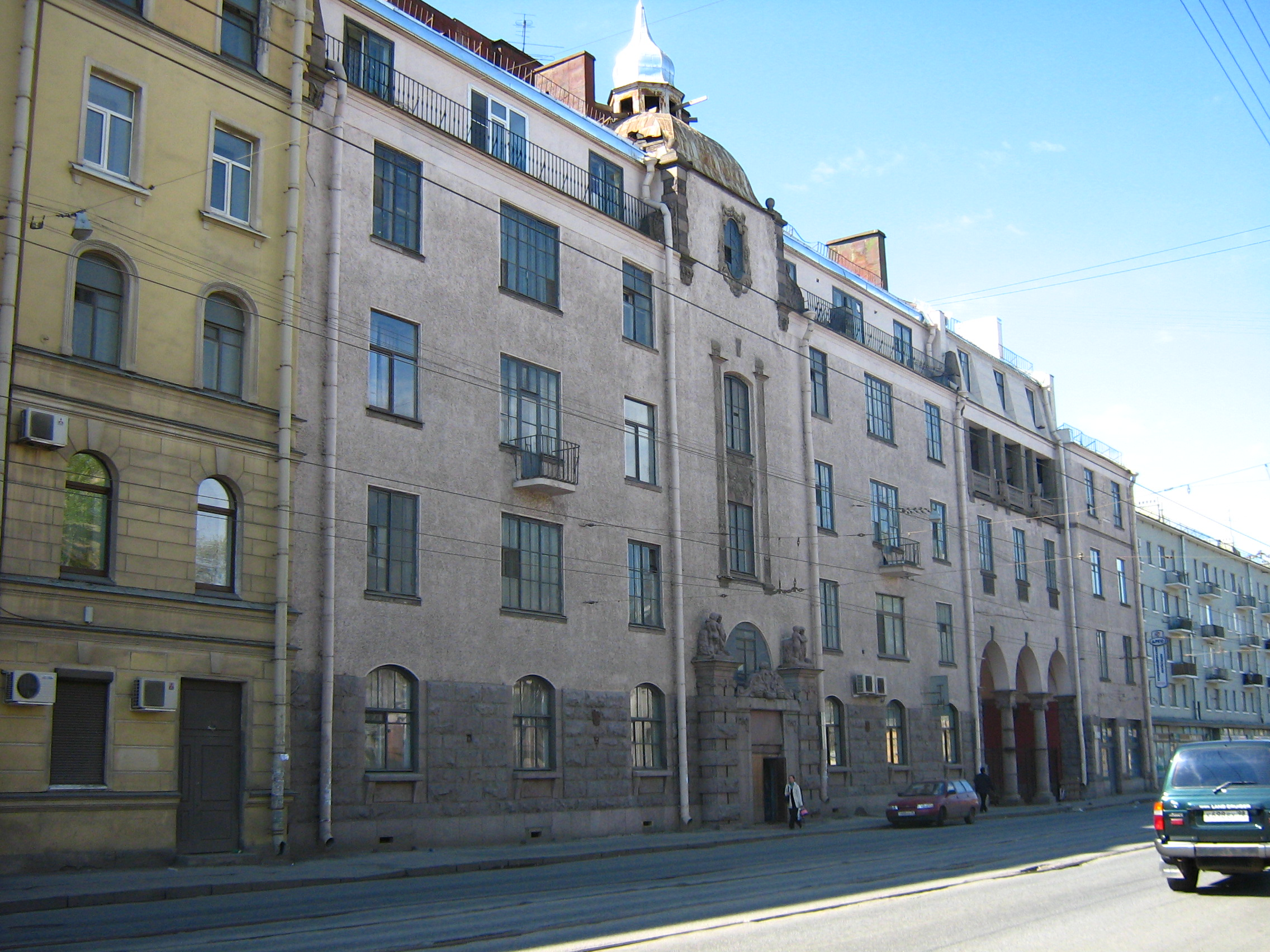
Lidval's house for Alfred Nobel on Lesnoy Prospect

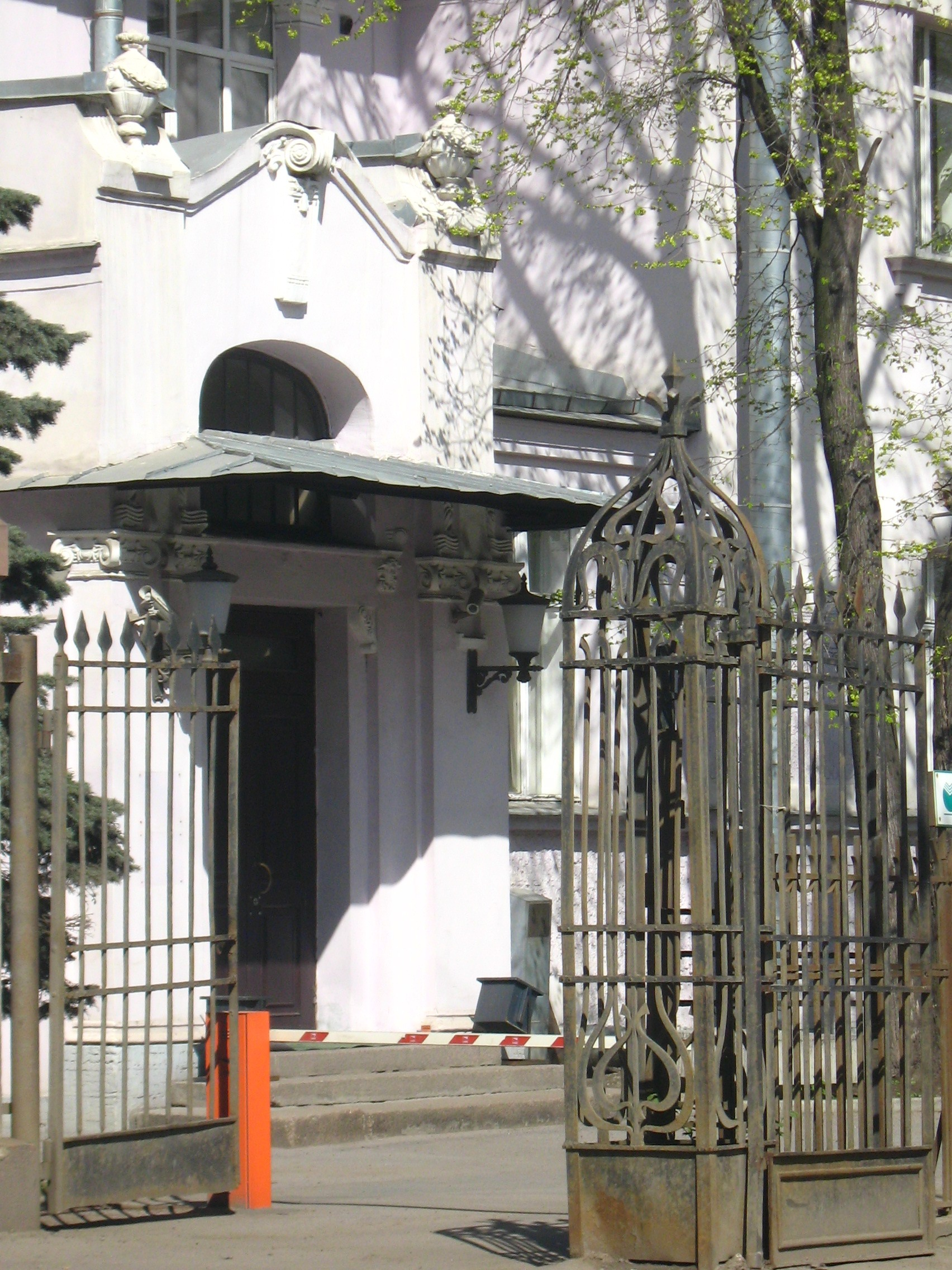
Entrance to Alfred Nobel house

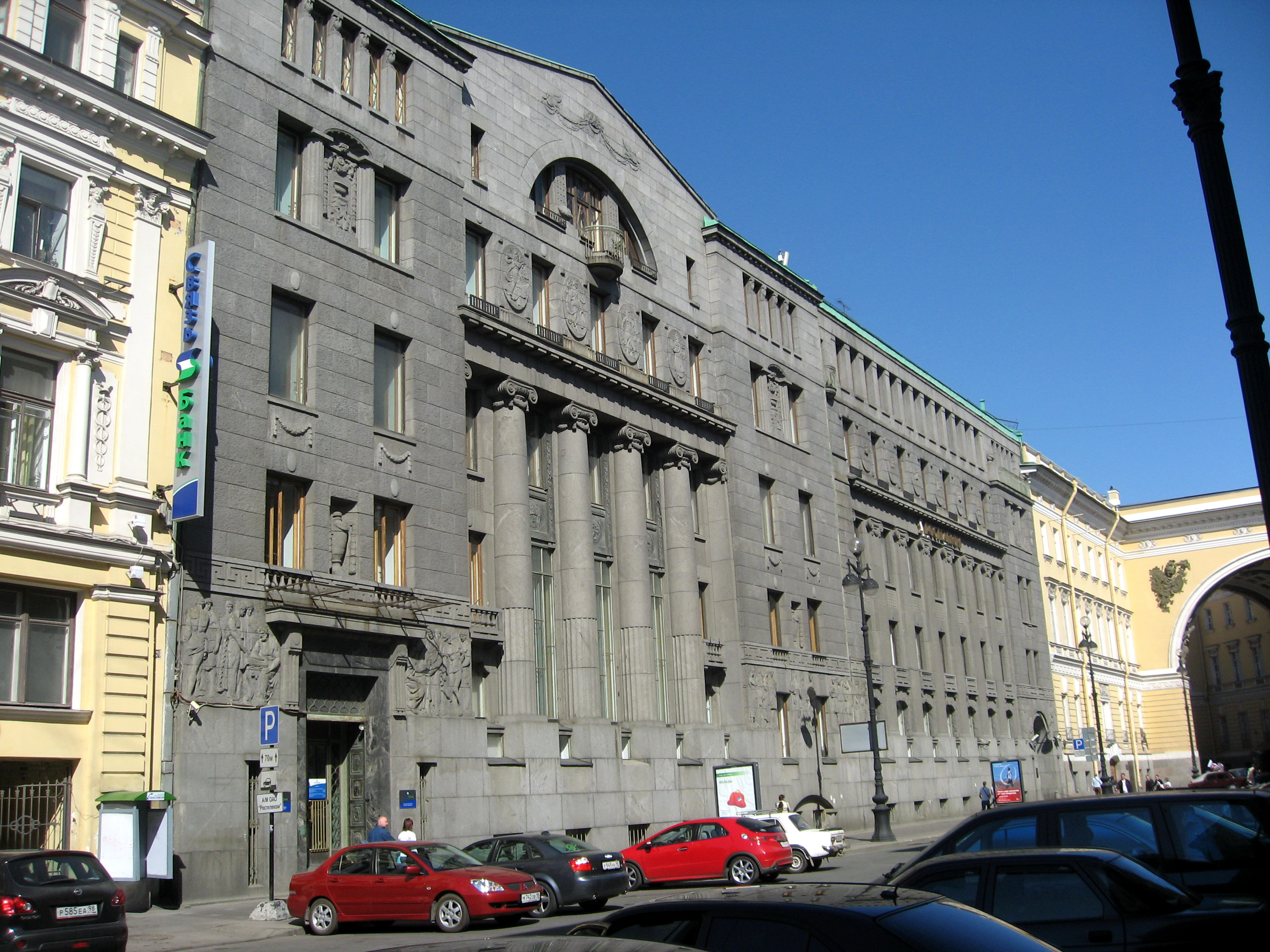
Lidval's Azov-Don Commercial Bank Building

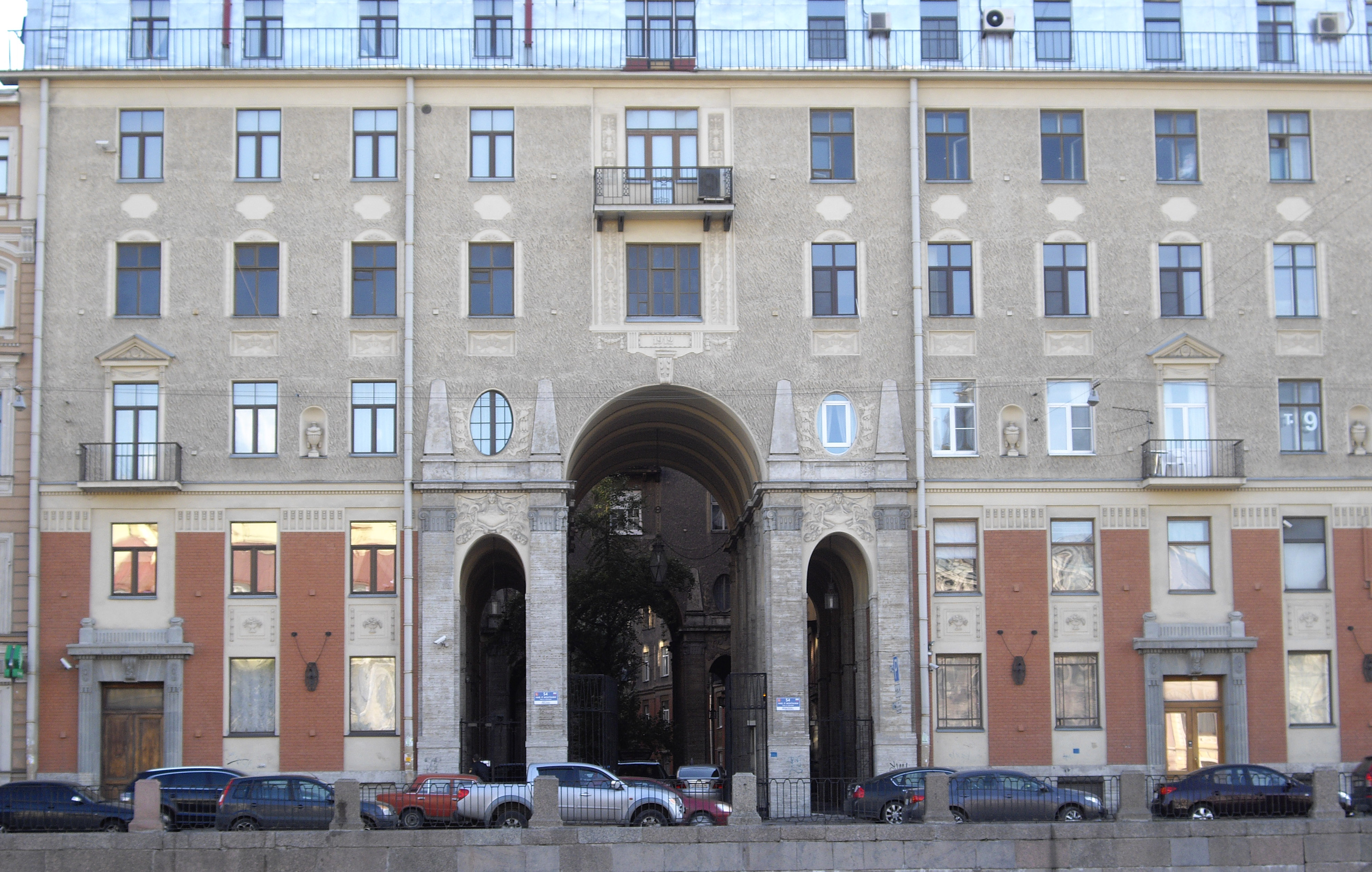
Lidval's Tolstoy House

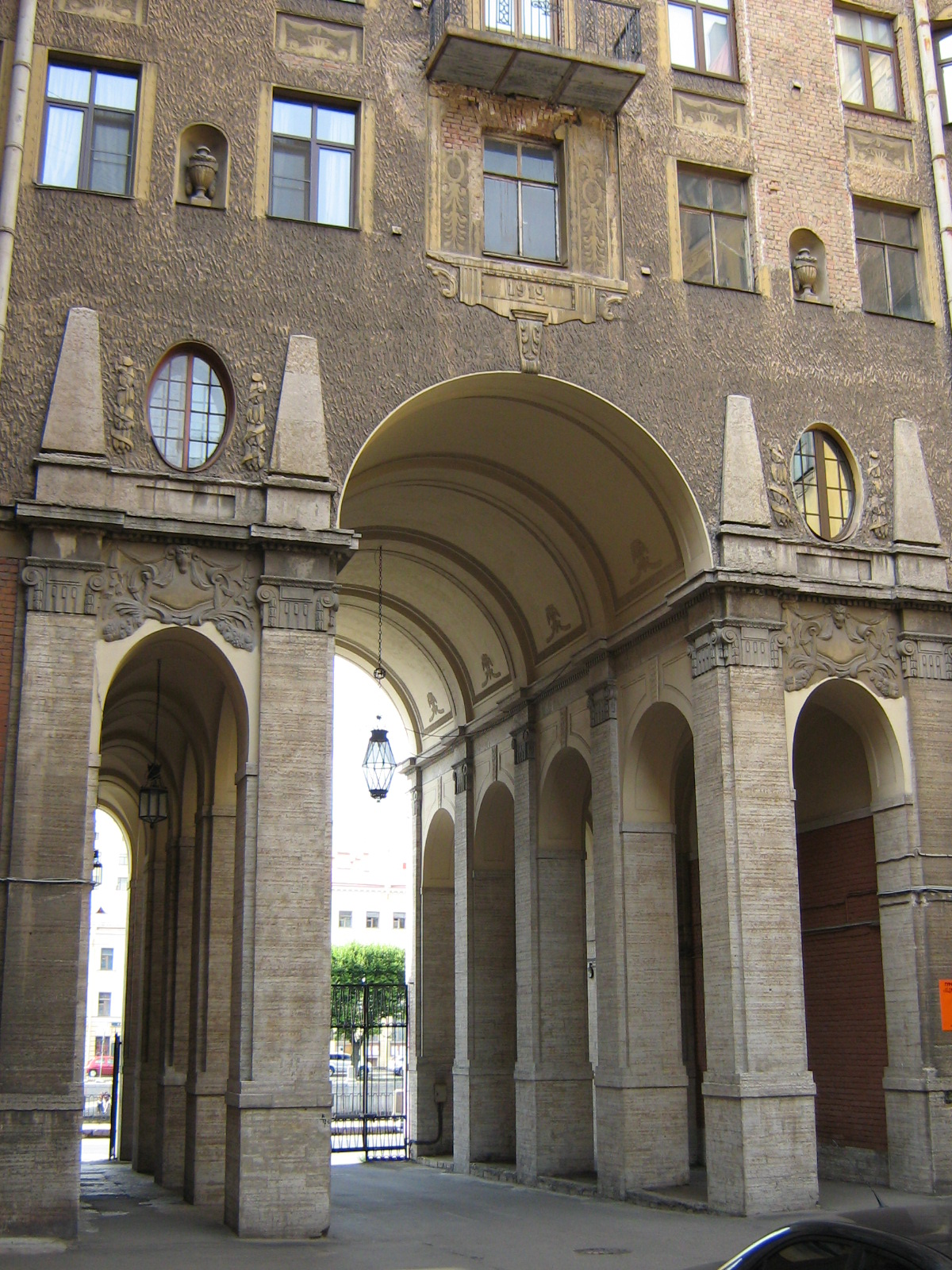
Arches at Tolstoy House

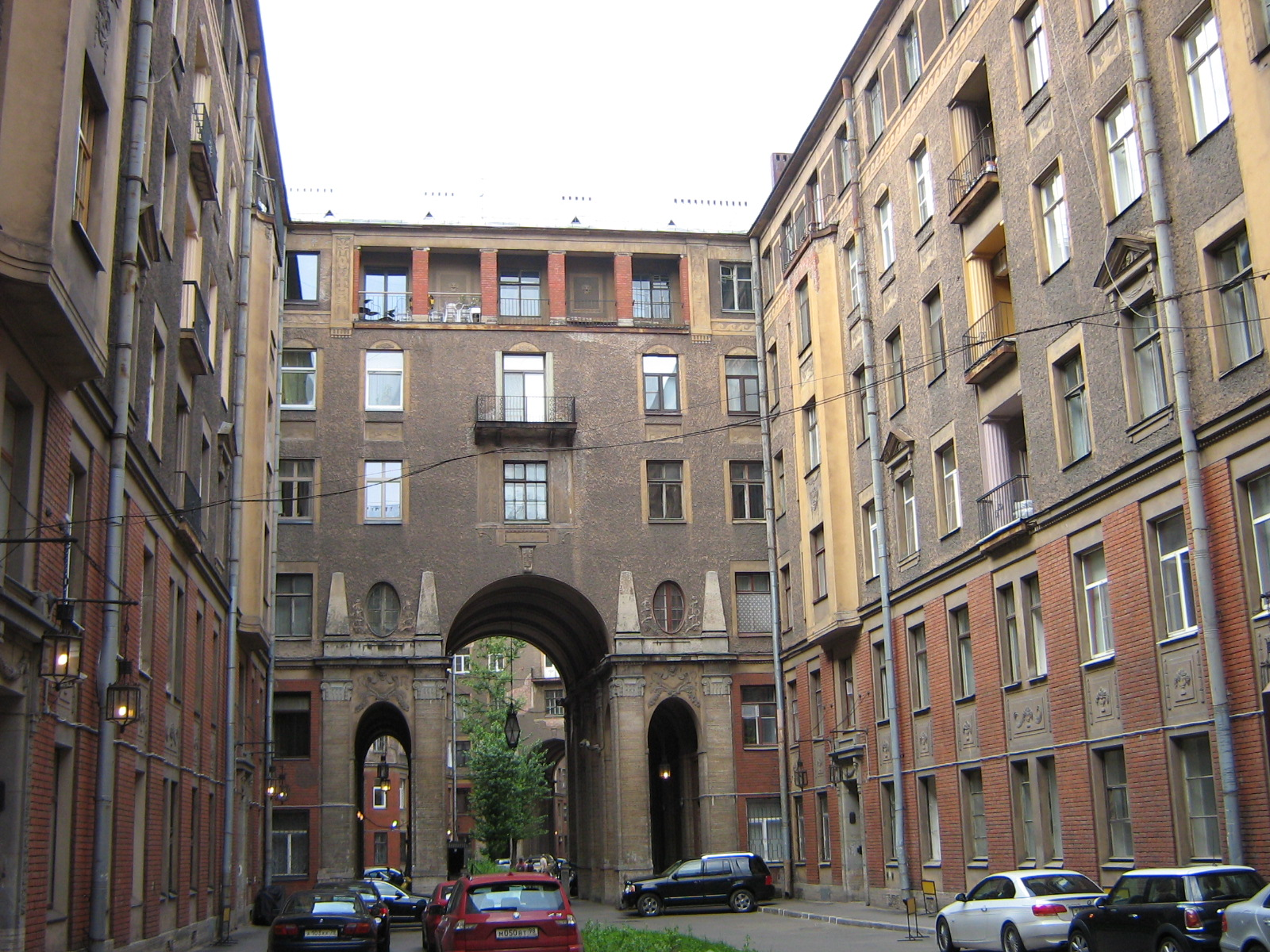
Another view of arches at Tolstoy House

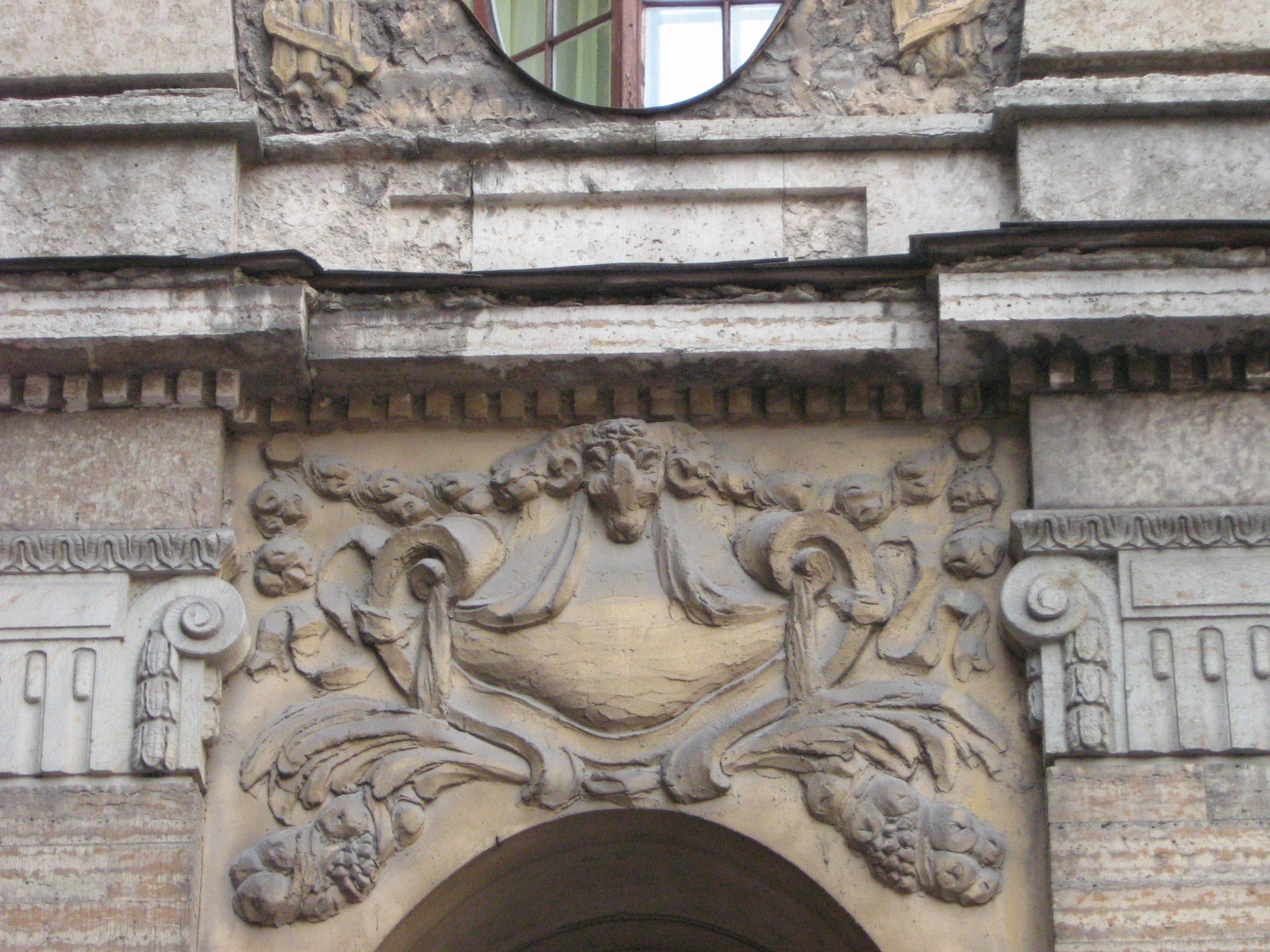
Tolstoy House detail

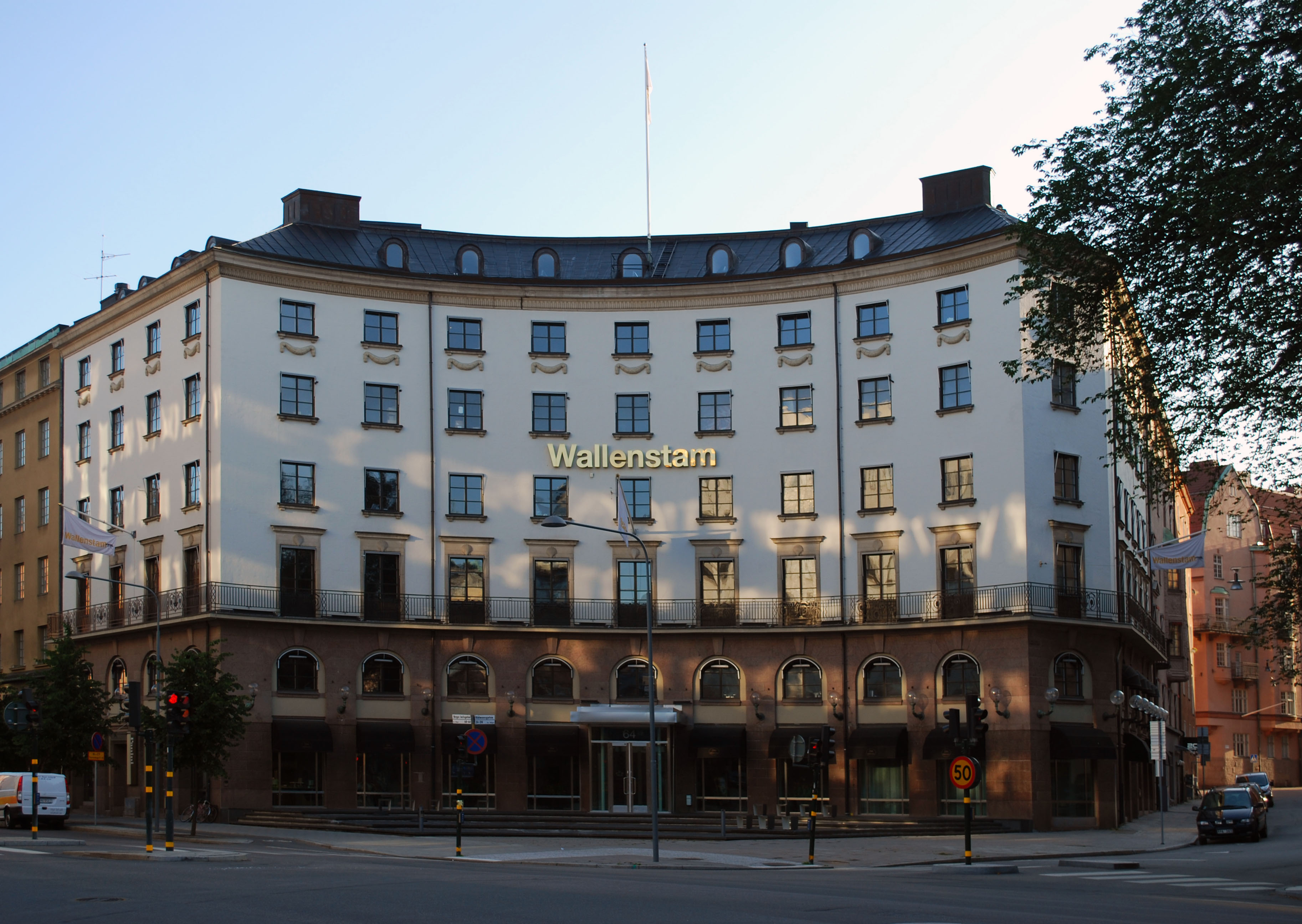
Shell House in Stockholm
