= Anatoly Naiman =

Russian poet, translator and writer (1936–2022)

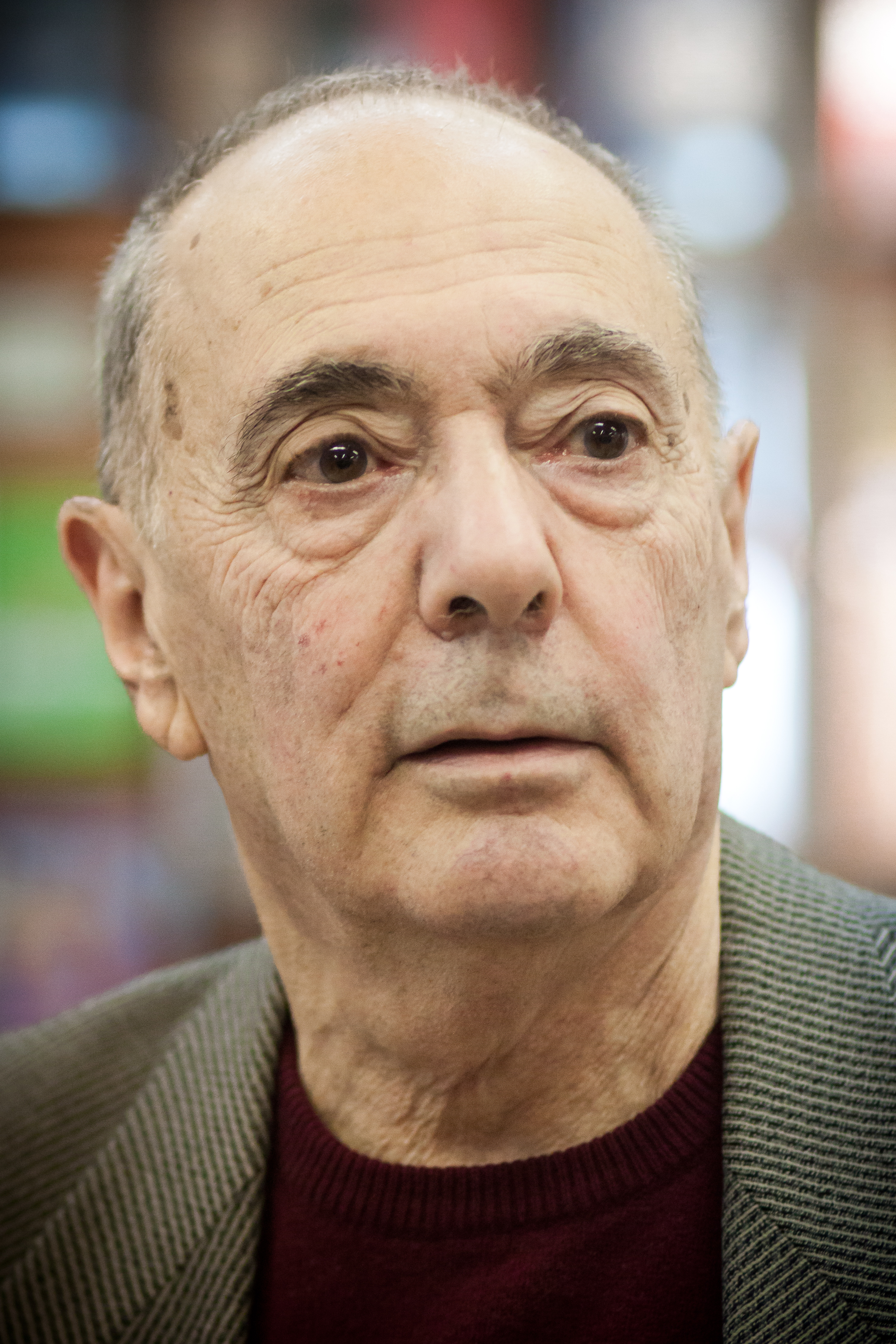

Anatoly Genrikhovich Naiman (Russian: Анатолий Генрихович Найман; 23 April 1936 – 21 January 2022) was a Russian poet, translator and writer. He was one of the four Akhmatova's Orphans.

== Biography ==
Born on 23 April 1936 in Leningrad, Naiman was a graduate of the Leningrad Technological Institute and was a fellow at Oxford University and the Kennan Institute of the Woodrow Wilson Center.

He died in Moscow on 21 January 2022, at the age of 85. He suffered a stroke few days prior to his death.

== Career ==
Naiman began writing poetry in 1954. As a translator of poetry, he had been published since 1959. In the late 1950s and early 1960s in Leningrad, he published several stories and poems under pseudonyms. Until 1989, his translations were mainly printed in the USSR.

In 1970, he wrote poems for the songs of the children's film "The Amazing Boy" (directed by Alexander Orlov), which were performed by Alla Pugacheva.

== Notable works ==
=== Translations ===
- Flamence (1983)
- Songs of the French Troubadors (1987)

=== Original Poetry ===
- Clouds at the End of the Century (1993)
- The Rhythm of a Hand (2000)
- Lions and Acrobats: Selected poetry of Anatoly Naiman, translated by Margo Shohl Rosen & F. D. Reeve (2005)

=== Novels ===
- Sir (2001)
- Kablukov (2005)
