= Donau Bank =

Bank in Vienna, Austria

Donau Bank AG was a bank in Vienna, Austria controlled by the Soviet Union and later, after the dissolution of the Soviet Union, by Russia.

On 30 May 2001, Donau Bank was acquired by Russian VTB Bank, which was headed by Yury Ponomarev. In 2006 the name was changed to VTB Bank (Austria) AG. With $1 billion in capital in March 2011, VTB Bank (Austria) AG, based in Vienna, was the largest European commercial bank of the Russian VTB Bank. On December 29, 2017, VTB Group completed restructuring its European operations. VTB Bank (Austria) AG, VTB Bank (Deutschland) AG und VTB Bank (France) SA, were merged into the newly created VTB Bank (Europe) SE (Frankfurt), which operates under a single banking license. Since that restructuring, VTB Bank (Europe) SE has the branch in Austria.

== History ==
- 1974 - Donau Bank AG is jointly founded in Vienna by the USSR State Bank and the Foreign Trade Bank of the USSR.
- 1987 to 20 November 1990 - Donau Bank AG is headed by Andrey Akimov. From 1989 to 1991, Alexander Ivanovich Medvedev (Russian: Александр Иванович Медведев) was a director at Donau Bank and was the managing director of the Donau Bank's subsidiary "Inter Trade Consult GmbH" (Austria). It allegedly serviced very large debts of Bulgaria and, which the Austrian Die Presse wrote at the time, was "adherence to an overly expansive business strategy." In the spring of 1990, Bulgaria declared a moratorium on servicing its external debt.
- 1990 - SOVLINK-American Corporation (Russian: ИК «Совлинк»), which specialized in the oil industry, closely cooperated with TNK and was owned by CB Alba Alliance LLC (Russian: ООО КБ «Альба Альянс»), was established in New York by the American consulting firm Salomon Brothers, Sedgwick, (Note: Beginning in 1989, Andres Baumgartner (born 1961, Zürich, Switzerland), who fluent in German, French, English and Russian, was a Law Clerk with Sedgwick, Detert, Moran & Arnold in San Francisco and Morrison & Foerster in San Francisco. Andres Baumgartner, who has a Zürich law office with Dietrich, Baumgartner & Partner which was founded in 1983 by Urs Dietrich (Note: Urs Dietrich (born 1940, Zürich, Switzerland), graduated in 1967 with a Doctorate of Law from the University of Zurich, was admitted to the bar in 1970 and speaks German, French and English.) with partners Andres Baumgartner and Fabio Delcò, asserts that he makes no secret of his top-level connections in Moscow and provides assistance to very wealthy Russians, "I have relationships with people from the KGB. Right up to Vladimir Putin." As of April 2016, Baumgartner, who is an American, lives at his villa in Zollikon, Zürich. He has a French wife Anne and three children with her. A close associate of Andres Baumgartner is Fabio Delcò (born 1967), who is an attorney at Dietrich, Baumgartner & Partner that graduated in 1992 from University of Zurich (lic.iur.) was admitted to the bar in 1995, received in 1997 his master's from the University of San Diego School of Law (LL.M.), was a Law Clerk in 1997 with DiCaro, Lacey & Nield in San Diego, received in 2000 his doctorate from the University of Zurich (Dr. iur.). Fabio Delcò is fluent in German, Italian, French, Spanish, English and has a basic knowledge of Russian.) Phibra Energy, plus the Soviet foreign Donau Bank and the state-owned Russian foreign economic association SovFinTrade (Russian: российским внешнеэкономическим объединением «СовФинТрейд»).
- 1992 - The Central Bank of the Russian Federation acquires 99.97% of the bank, the remaining 0.03% is retained by the Foreign Trade Bank of the USSR (Vneshtorgbank).
- 1997 - VTB acquires a 51% majority share in Donau Bank AG.
- 2005 - VTB acquires 100% interest in Donau Bank AG.
- 2006 - In the context of VTB’s international rebranding program, Donau Bank AG is renamed VTB Bank (Austria) AG.
- 2007 - VTB Bank (Deutschland) AG and VTB Bank (France) SA are placed under VTB Bank (Austria) AG and together form a subgroup of the VTB Group.
- 2011 - Launch of VTB Direct Bank in Germany
- 2017 - 2018: VTB Bank (Austria) AG, VTB Bank (Deutschland) AG und VTB Bank (France) SA, were merged into the newly created VTB Bank (Europe) SE (Frankfurt), which operates under a single banking license. Since that restructuring, VTB Bank (Europe) SE has the branch in Austria.

== Management board ==
Donau Bank AG (VTB Bank (Austria) AG) had the following management board members:

- Valery P. Ipatoo
- Oleg M. Preksin
- Dkfm Otto Dracka
- Andrei Tchetyrkine
- Vladimir G. Malinin Chairman of the Board from December 1990 to April 1996 (Note: Malinin, Vladimir Georgievich (Russian: Малинин, Владимир Георгиевич; 29 June 1940 Moscow, Soviet Union - 4 February 2021 Vienna, Austria) graduated from the Financial University in 1963 with a degree in economics. From 1964 to 1968, he was at Foreign Trade Bank of the USSR as an inspector, senior economist, senior consultant, head of the foreign exchange and cash operations department, and from 1968 to 1969 he was the Deputy Chief Accountant. From 1969 to 1970, he was at Moscow Narodny Bank in London and then transferred to its Beirut branch and from 1970 to 1971, he was the chief accountant under Viktor Gerashchenko and from 1971 to 1974, the deputy general manager under Tomas Alibegov. From 1977 to 1984, he was director of East-West United Bank (EWUB) (Luxembourg). After EWUB, Malinin returned to the Foreign Trade Bank of the USSR and from 1984 to 1985 was the head of the foreign bank loans department then in 1985 was the head of the department for monitoring the operational activities of overseas Soviet banks until February 1988 when he became the Deputy Chairman of the Board of the Vnesheconombank of the USSR until December 1990. He moved to Vienna and from December 1990 to April 1996, he was Chairman of the Board of Donau Bank. In 2012, he became an independent director at Vozrozhdenie Bank and served on its board of directors until his death in 2021.)
- Dr. Valeriy V. Lyakin
- Dr. Richard Vornberg (CEO)
- Christian Müllner
- Evgenij Minkin
- Igor Strehl (CEO)
- Alexey Krokhin (CEO)
- Simeon Nestorov
- Andrey Girichev (CEO)
- Andrey Skvortsov
- Mag. Damir Mehic
- Mag. Bernhard Schmidt
- Maria Minaeva
- Mark Airston
- Oxana Kozliouk

== See also ==
- Banking in the Soviet Union
- List of banks in Austria

== See also ==
- Foreign trade of the Soviet Union
