= Foreign trade of the Soviet Union =

Soviet foreign trade played only a minor role in the Soviet economy. In 1985, for example, exports and imports each accounted for only 4 percent of the Soviet gross national product. The Soviet Union maintained this low level because it could draw upon a large energy and raw material base, and because it historically had pursued a policy of self-sufficiency. Other foreign economic activity included economic aid programs, which primarily benefited the less developed Council for Mutual Economic Assistance (COMECON) countries of Cuba, Mongolia, and Vietnam.

The Soviet Union conducted the bulk of its foreign economic activities with communist countries, particularly those of Eastern Europe. In 1988, Soviet trade with socialist countries amounted to 62 percent of total Soviet foreign trade. Between 1965 and 1988, trade with the Third World made up a steady 10 to 15 percent of the Soviet Union's foreign trade. Trade with the industrialized West, especially the United States, fluctuated, influenced by political relations between East and West, as well as by the Soviet Union's short-term needs. In the 1970s, during the period of détente, trade with the West gained in importance at the expense of trade with socialist countries. In the early and mid-1980s, when relations between the superpowers were poor, however, Soviet trade with the West decreased in favor of increased integration with Eastern Europe.

The manner in which the Soviet Union transacted trade varied from one trade partner to another. Soviet trade with the Western industrialized countries, except Finland, and most Third World countries was conducted with hard currency, that is, currency that was freely convertible. Because the ruble was not freely convertible, the Soviet Union could only acquire hard currency by selling Soviet goods or gold on the world market for hard currency. Therefore, the volume of imports from countries using convertible currency depended on the amount of goods the Soviet Union exported for hard currency. Alternative methods of cooperation, such as barter, counter trade, industrial cooperation, or bilateral clearing agreements were much preferred. These methods were used in transactions with Finland, members of Comecon, the People's Republic of China, Yugoslavia, and a number of Third World countries.

Commodity composition of Soviet trade differed by region. The Soviet Union imported manufactured, agricultural, and consumer goods from socialist countries in exchange for energy and manufactured goods. The Soviet Union earned hard currency by exporting fuels and other primary products to the industrialized West and then used this currency to buy sophisticated manufactures and agricultural products, primarily grain. Trade with the Third World usually involved exchanging machinery and armaments for tropical foodstuffs and raw materials.

Soviet aid programs expanded steadily from 1965 to 1985. In 1985, the Soviet Union provided an estimated US$6.9 billion to the Third World in the form of direct cash, credit disbursements, or trade subsidies. The communist Third World, primarily Cuba, Mongolia, and Vietnam, received 85 percent of these funds. In the late 1980s, the Soviet Union reassessed its aid programs. In light of reduced political returns and domestic economic problems, the Soviet Union could ill afford ineffective disbursements of its limited resources. Moreover, dissatisfied with Soviet economic assistance, several Soviet client states opened trade discussions with Western countries.

In the 1980s, the Soviet Union needed considerable sums of hard currency to pay for food and capital goods imports and to support client states. What the country could not earn from exports or gold sales it borrowed through its banks in London, Frankfurt, Vienna, Paris, and Luxembourg. Large grain imports pushed the Soviet debt quite high in 1981. Better harvests and lower import requirements redressed this imbalance in subsequent years. By late 1985, however, a decrease in oil revenues nearly returned the Soviet debt to its 1981 level. At the end of that same year, the Soviet Union owed US$31 billion (gross) to Western creditors, mostly commercial banks and other private sources.

In the late 1980s, the Soviet Union attempted to reduce its hard-currency debt by decreasing imports from the West and increasing oil and gas exports to the West. It also sought increased participation in international markets and organizations. In 1987, the Soviet Union formally requested observer status in the General Agreement on Tariffs and Trade and in 1988, signed a normalization agreement with the European Economic Community. Structural changes in the foreign trade bureaucracy, granting direct trading rights to select enterprises, and legislation establishing joint ventures with foreigners opened up the economy to the Western technical and managerial expertise necessary to achieve the goals established by General Secretary Mikhail Gorbachev's program of economic restructuring (perestroika).

== Development of the state monopoly on foreign trade ==
The government of the Soviet Union always held a monopoly on all foreign trade activity, but only after the death of Joseph Stalin in 1953 did the government accord importance to foreign trade activities. Before that time, the Bolsheviks' ideological opposition to external economic control, their refusal to pay Russia's World War I debts, and the chaos of the Russian Civil War (1918–21) kept trade to the minimum level required for the country's industrial development. Active Soviet trade operations began only in 1921, when the government established the People's Commissariat of Foreign Trade.

The commissariat's monopoly on internal and external foreign trade was loosened, beginning in 1921, when the New Economic Policy (NEP) decentralized control of the economy. Although the commissariat remained the controlling center, the regime established other organizations to deal directly with foreign partners in the buying and selling of goods. These organizations included state import and export offices, joint stock companies, specialized import and export corporations, trusts, syndicates, cooperative organizations, and mixed-ownership companies.

The end of the NEP period, the beginning of the first five-year plan (1928–32), and the forced collectivization of agriculture beginning in 1929 marked the early Stalin era. The government restructured foreign trade operations according to Decree Number 358, issued in February 1930, which eliminated the decentralized, essentially private, trading practices of the NEP period and established a system of monopoly specialization. The government then organized a number of foreign trade corporations under the People's Commissariat of Foreign Trade, each with a monopoly over a specific group of commodities. The foreign trade monopoly appeared in article 14h of the 1936 Soviet Constitution.

Stalin's policy restricted trade as it attempted to build socialism in one country. Stalin feared the unpredictable movement and disruptive influence of such foreign market forces as demand and price fluctuations. Imports were restricted to factory equipment essential for the industrialization drive that began with the first five-year plan. This equipment was paid for by exporting collectivised grain.

World War II virtually halted Soviet trade and the activity of most foreign trade corporations. Trade was conducted primarily through Soviet trade representatives in Britain and Iran and the Soviet Buying Commission in the United States. After the war, Britain and other West European countries and the United States imposed drastic restrictions on trade with the Soviet Union. Thus, Soviet foreign trade corporations limited their efforts to Eastern Europe and China, establishing Soviet-owned companies in these countries and setting up joint-stock companies on very favorable terms. Comecon, founded in 1949, united the economies of Eastern Europe with that of the Soviet Union.

Soviet trade changed considerably in the post-Stalin era. Postwar industrialization and an expansion of foreign trade resulted in the proliferation of all-union foreign trade organizations (FTOs), the new name for foreign trade corporations and also known as foreign trade associations. In 1946 the People's Commissariat of Foreign Trade was reorganized into the Ministry of Foreign Trade. The Ministry of Foreign Trade, through its FTOs, retained the exclusive right to negotiate and sign contracts with foreigners and to draft foreign trade plans. The State Committee for Foreign Economic Relations (Gosudarstvennyi komitet po vneshnim ekonomicheskim sviaziam—GKES), created in 1955, managed all foreign aid programs and the export of complete factories through the FTOs subordinate to it. Certain ministries, however, had the right to deal directly with foreign partners through their own FTOs.

On January 17, 1988, Izvestiia reported the abolition of the Ministry of Foreign Trade and GKES. These two organizations were merged into the newly created Ministry of Foreign Economic Relations, which had responsibility for administering foreign trade policy and foreign aid agreements. Other legislation provided for the establishment of joint enterprises. The government retained its monopoly on foreign trade through a streamlined version of the Soviet foreign trade bureaucracy as it existed before the January 17 decree.

== Structure of the foreign trade bureaucracy ==
In 1988, the foreign trade bureaucracy reflected the monopoly specification system created by the 1930 Decree Number 358. Under the authority of the Communist Party of the Soviet Union (CPSU) and the Council of Ministers, six central bodies, the Ministry of Foreign Economic Relations, and numerous FTOs together planned, regulated, monitored, and carried out all Soviet foreign economic activity.

=== Administration ===
Although the CPSU has ultimate authority over all foreign economic activity, in the late 1980s, administrative control was centralized in the Council of Ministers. More specifically, the council's State Foreign Economic Commission coordinated the activities of ministries and departments in the area of economic and scientific cooperation with socialist, developing, and developed capitalist states.

Six central bodies under the Council of Ministers played important roles in foreign economic relations. The import and export of goods, services, and resources were managed by the State Planning Committee (Gosudarstvennyi planovyi komitet – Gosplan), the State Committee for Material and Technical Supply (Gosudarstvennyi komitet po material'no-tekhnicheskomu snabzheniiu – Gossnab), and the State Committee for Science and Technology (Gosudarstvennyi komitet po nauke i tekhnike—GKNT). Gosplan formulated all import and export plans, coordinated the allocation of investment and other resources, and had final authority over all decisions concerning foreign trade, including trade levels and commodity composition. Gossnab coordinated the allocation of resources not handled by Gosplan and, as the central agency responsible for matching supplies with customers, played a major role in selecting and allocating imports. GKNT negotiated technical cooperation agreements and monitored license and patent purchases and sales in order to introduce new technology into the Soviet economy.

The State Committee on Prices (Gosudarstvennyi komitet po tsenam – Goskomtsen), the Ministry of Finance, and the State Bank (Gosudarstvennyi bank – Gosbank) held jurisdiction over the financing of foreign trade. Goskomtsen established prices for all imports and some exports. The Ministry of Finance controlled the balance of payments and monitored the impact of foreign trade on the state budget. Finally, Gosbank set the exchange rate for the ruble and managed the system of exchange within the Soviet Union. Gosbank supervised the Foreign Trade Bank of the USSR (Vnesheconombank after 1988), which provided international banking services for Soviet FTOs.

=== Operation ===
Until 1988, the two operative bodies involved solely and directly in foreign economic operations were GKES and the Ministry of Foreign Trade. The Ministry of Foreign Trade formulated draft import and export plans and regulated commodity trade. GKES supervised foreign aid programs and the export of complete plants. The Ministry of Foreign Trade or GKES had jurisdiction over most FTOs, which negotiated and signed commercial contracts with foreigners on behalf of individual enterprises. FTOs were generally organized by product, as had been the foreign trade corporations of the 1930s.

Some industrial ministries or other agencies, however, had their own FTOs. As of early 1987, for example, forty-eight FTOs were under the jurisdiction of the Ministry of Foreign Trade and nine under the GKES, whereas the Ministry of the Maritime Fleet, the Ministry of the Fishing Industry, and the Ministry of Trade, among others, had their own FTOs. In addition, certain other agencies had their own FTOs: the Chamber of Commerce and Industry, which handled international trade exhibitions; the State Committee for Physical Culture and Sports; the Central Union of Cooperatives; the State Committee for Publishing Houses, Printing Plants, and the Book Trade; the State Committee for Cinematography; and the State Committee for Science and Technology.

=== Structural reforms, 1986 to mid-1988 ===
The cumbersome foreign trade bureaucracy contributed to a number of problems that hindered the efficiency and effectiveness of foreign trade. The lack of direct contact between Soviet enterprises and their foreign customers or suppliers frustrated both parties by unnecessarily delaying contract negotiations and the specification of technical details. In a May 1986 interview with Izvestiia, the general director of the Ministry of Foreign Trade's All-Union Association for the Export and Import of Technical Equipment, Boris K. Pushkin, reported that after an enterprise submitted a request for a foreign item, two to three years were required before it was included in the import plan and funds were allocated for its purchase. In the interim, the needs of the enterprise had often changed. Pushkin stressed the need to free enterprises from unnecessary petty supervision and excessive regulation.

Taking such problems into account, the Twenty-Seventh Party Congress in February–March 1986 declared that the party anticipated "a step-by-step restructuring of [the country's] foreign trade in order to make exports and imports more effective. In August of the same year, the CPSU Central Committee and the Council of Ministers adopted the decree On Measures for Improving Management of External Economic Relations," which outlined drastic steps to change the structure of the foreign trade bureaucracy.

Also in August 1986, the Council of Ministers' State Foreign Economic Commission became a permanent body within the council, giving more authority and visibility to the commission, the domestic activities of which previously went largely unreported. The staff was augmented, and the chairman acquired a rank equivalent to that of deputy prime minister. The new charter stated that the commission's role was "to formulate and implement the country's foreign economic strategy so as to enhance its potential contributions to acceleration (uskorenie), strengthen the Soviet position in the world economy, and promote structured and organized development of economic cooperation with all groups of countries."

Until 1987, the forty-eight FTOs subordinate to the Ministry of Foreign Trade administered more than 90 percent of Soviet foreign trade turnover. In 1987, the ministry lost control of 20 percent of Soviet foreign trade turnover. The government granted direct foreign trade rights to twenty-one ministries and state committees, sixty-seven industrial enterprises, and eight interbranch scientific production complexes. Exporting enterprises gained the right to retain part of their hard-currency earnings. Each ministry or enterprise was to pay for its investment imports with its own hard currency, and the heads of ministries and enterprises became personally responsible for the efficient use of hard-currency funds. These measures gave enterprises more influence in import decision making.

On January 13, 1987, the Council of Ministers adopted the resolution "On Questions Concerning the Creation, on U.S.S.R. Territory, and the Activities of Joint Enterprises, International Associations, and Organizations with the Participation of Soviet and Foreign Organizations, Firms, and Management Bodies," or, more simply, a law on joint ventures. This legislation opened up enterprises inside the Soviet Union for the first time since the Bolshevik Revolution, to foreign participation. Joint ventures were to facilitate the acquisition and assimilation of Western technology, managerial know-how, and marketing abilities. Optimistic about the economic effects of their new undertaking, Soviet officials declared that 85 to 90 percent of "the most important types of machinery" would meet world technical standards by 1990. The Soviet Union's vast natural resources and its lucrative, previously closed, domestic market attracted Western companies. By August 1988, more than fifty joint ventures were registered in the Soviet Union, and approximately three hundred were under negotiation.

Nevertheless, numerous obstacles arose in the first eighteen months after the government adopted the joint venture law. Complaints by Western partners dealt with uncertainties concerning Soviet trade regulations, problems with the supply of goods, the dilemma of the non-convertibility of the ruble, difficulties finding qualified Soviet managers, problems in projecting production costs (as of 1989 Soviet domestic prices were administratively set and not based on market forces), and even complications finding office space in Moscow. Soviet trade officials' efforts to accommodate these complaints included the decentralization of the foreign trade bureaucracy, the establishment of a management institute in Moscow, price reforms, and various legal reforms.

Before Western businessmen could recover from the confusion and disruption caused by this series of reforms, a second series began in early 1988. Effective January 1, 1988, the Foreign Trade Bank of the USSR (Vneshtorgbank) was renamed the Foreign Economic Activity Bank (Vneshekonombank). The name change did not signify a major change in the bank's duties but simply more accurately reflected the nature of its operations. Vneshtorgbank had branched out from the simple management of foreign trade transactions to provide currency, credit, and accounting services as well. In a change from its previous duties, Vneshekonombank was required to administer new procedures dealing with Soviet firms that had recently acquired direct foreign trade rights.

Also on January 1, 1988, the New Enterprise Law went into effect, making enterprises economically accountable for their ow business operations by 1989. According to this law, the government had the power to disband unprofitable businesses, and each ministry and its subordinate enterprises gained the responsibility for their own foreign trade activities. In addition, Gosplan, Gossnab, and GKNT relinquished some of their rights to allocate money and goods. Finally, the Ministry of Foreign Trade lost control of 15 percent more of its foreign trade turnover when fourteen additional enterprises and four other ministries acquired direct foreign trade rights.

Yet probably the most significant change in the foreign trade mechanism occurred on January 17, 1988, when Izvestiia announced the abolition of the Ministry of Foreign Trade and the GKES. The Ministry of Foreign Economic Relations, headed by Konstantin F. Katushev, former head of the GKES, assumed the duties of the two agencies. "Thus, the state monopoly on foreign trade and its state-wide aspects remains centralized," reported the Soviet foreign trade monthly Vneshniaia torgovlia (Foreign Trade), "while operational functions are continually being shifted to the business level." In March 1988, the journal reported that approximately 20 percent of foreign trade turnover was handled by the eighty-one firms that had been granted the right to deal directly with foreigners.

Other reforms followed in April 1988, when the Central Committee and the Council of Ministers agreed on a new charter for the Chamber of Commerce and Industry. In general, the chamber monitored foreign trade conducted outside the new Ministry of Foreign Economic Relations. In addition, the chamber assisted Soviet production enterprises in locating Western partners and learning foreign trade practices.

== Trade with socialist countries ==
In the late 1980s, the Soviet Union traded with fourteen socialist countries. The political and economic relationships between the Soviet Union and these countries determine the four groups into which these countries can be divided: members of Comecon; Yugoslavia; China; and the developing communist countries of Cambodia, Laos, and the Democratic People's Republic of Korea (North Korea).

Business with socialist countries was conducted on a bilateral, country-by-country basis in which imports balanced exports. Soviet oil exports to these countries bought machinery and equipment and industrial consumer goods, as well as political support without the expenditure of freely convertible foreign currency. In addition, Soviet aid programs, which took the form of direct loans or trade subsidies, almost exclusively involved socialist countries.

=== The Council for Mutual Economic Assistance ===
The Soviet Union formed the Council for Mutual Economic Assistance (Comecon) in 1949, in part to discourage the countries of Eastern Europe from participating in the Marshall Plan and to counteract trade boycotts imposed after World War II by the United States and by Britain and other West European countries. Ostensibly, Comecon was organized to coordinate economic and technical cooperation between the Soviet Union and the member countries. In reality, the Soviet Union's domination over Comecon activities reflected its economic, political, and military power. In 1989, Comecon comprised ten countries: the six original members—Bulgaria, Czechoslovakia, Hungary, Poland, Romania, and the Soviet Union—plus the German Democratic Republic (East Germany, which joined in 1950), Mongolia (1962), Cuba (1972), and Vietnam (1978). Albania, although it joined in February 1949, has not participated in Comecon activities since 1961.

Since 1949, the Soviet Union has traded primarily with other Comecon members. In 1960, the Soviet Union sent 56 percent of its exports to and received 58 percent of its imports from Comecon members. From that time, the volume of this trade has steadily increased, but the proportion of Soviet trade with Comecon members decreased as the Soviet Union sought to increase trade with Western industrialized countries. In contrast to 1960, trade with Comecon members accounted for only 42 percent of Soviet exports and 43 percent of Soviet imports in 1980.

The European members of Comecon looked to the Soviet Union for oil; in turn, they provided machinery, equipment, agricultural goods, industrial goods, and consumer goods to the Soviet Union. Because of the peculiarities of the Comecon pricing system, throughout the 1970s and early 1980s, Comecon prices for Soviet oil were lower than world oil prices. Western specialists have debated the political motivation of this implicit price subsidy to Comecon members. The cohesiveness within Comecon members seemed remarkable when in 1985 the fall in the world price left Comecon members paying above-market prices for Soviet oil.

The membership of Cuba, Mongolia, and Vietnam in Comecon served Soviet foreign policy interests more than the economic welfare of Comecon members. In general, the more economically developed European members have supported the three less developed members by providing a large market for their exports, often at above-market prices. Most of Cuba's sugar and nickel and all of Mongolia's copper and molybdenum have been imported by the Soviet Union. In addition, the Soviet Union has established naval and air bases in Cuba and Vietnam.

From 1985, Gorbachev began calling for an increase in trade with Comecon members. At the Twenty-Seventh Party Congress in February–March 1986, both he and Prime Minister Nikolai Ryzhkov stressed the need to improve cooperation with the socialist countries on the basis of Comecon's Comprehensive Program for Scientific and Technical Cooperation up to the Year 2000. This program stressed the self-sufficiency of Comecon countries in five key areas: electronics, automation of production, nuclear power, biotechnology, and development of new raw materials. It also called for improvement of plan coordination, joint planning, Comecon investment strategy, production specialization, and quality of machinery and equipment exported to the Soviet Union.

=== Yugoslavia ===
In 1964, Yugoslavia negotiated a formal agreement of cooperation with Comecon. This relationship allowed Yugoslavia to maintain its nonaligned position while acquiring almost all the rights and privileges of a full Comecon member. In the 1980s, the Soviet Union's trade relationship with Yugoslavia resembled its relationship with full members of Comecon. The Soviet Union exported fuel, ferrous metals, plastics, and fertilizer to Yugoslavia. Yugoslavia's machine-tool, power-engineering, shipbuilding, and consumer goods industries supplied the Soviet Union with soft-currency goods.

In the late 1970s and early 1980s, Yugoslavia became more dependent on Soviet oil, as hostilities in the Persian Gulf cut off its supply of Iraqi oil. In addition, from 1970 well into the 1980s, actual trade with the Soviet Union exceeded planned trade volumes. Thus, in 1983, the Yugoslav government informed Soviet Prime Minister Nikolai Tikhonov of its desire to decrease trade with the Soviet Union in the mid-to-late 1980s. Because of the huge foreign currency debt accumulated by Yugoslavia from 1981 to 1985, however, the Soviet Union remained its most important trade partner in the late 1980s. In fact, for some Yugoslav products, such as shoes, the Soviet Union was the sole foreign buyer.

=== China ===
In the 1950s, the Soviet Union claimed half of China's foreign trade. The political rift that developed between the two countries in the late 1950s culminated in 1960 with the withdrawal of more than 1,000 Soviet specialists from China and an official break in trade relations in 1964. (See Sino-Soviet split) Although it had been only an observer, China stopped attending Comecon sessions in 1961. Economic relations between the Soviet Union and China resumed in 1982. Primarily as a result of Soviet political concessions and pressures on the Chinese to expand trade, trade volume between the two countries increased tenfold between 1982 and 1987.

In the 1980s, the Soviet Union proved to be an ideal trade partner for China. China's exports were not competitive on the world market, and its foreign currency reserves were severely depleted by record foreign trade deficits in 1984 and 1985. Likewise, the Soviet Union, producing dated technology that was difficult to market in more industrially advanced countries and acquiring a growing hard-currency debt, eagerly pursued the Chinese market. Each country would sell the other goods it could not market elsewhere, and each could conserve scarce hard currency by bartering. The Soviet Union possessed machinery, equipment, and technical know-how to help China develop its fuel and mineral resources and power, transportation, and metallurgical industries. China could offer a wealth of raw materials, textiles, and agricultural and industrial consumer goods.

Stepped-up economic relations reflected Soviet flexibility in overcoming various political and administrative stumbling blocks. By mid-1988, Gorbachev was speaking of reducing Soviet troops on the Chinese border, Vietnam had removed half of its troops from Cambodia, and Soviet troops had begun their withdrawal from Afghanistan. Reforms of the Soviet foreign trade complex established free trade zones in the Soviet Far East and Soviet Central Asia, simplifying border trade between the two countries. Soviet trade officials persuaded the Chinese to expand business ties beyond border trade into joint ventures, co-production contracts, and the export of surplus Chinese labor to the Soviet Union. The Peking Restaurant in Moscow, specializing in Chinese cuisine, became the first joint venture between the Soviet Union and China. In April 1988, China's Minister of Foreign Economic Relations and Trade, Zheng Tuobin, stated that China would continue to expand trade with the Soviet Union "at a rapid pace," thus rewarding Soviet persistence in expanding trade with China.

=== Cambodia, Laos, and North Korea ===
Soviet economic relations with non-Comecon communist states have taken the form of aid and trade. In 1987, approximately 85 percent of Soviet aid went to the communist Third World. By far, the largest share of these funds was absorbed by Cuba, Mongolia, and Vietnam. The rest was left to Cambodia, Laos, and North Korea. Pledges of Soviet aid increased steadily from 1985 through 1988 and were divided evenly between direct aid and trade subsidies. Commodity exchange was characterized by the Soviet Union's providing machinery, fuel, and transportation equipment in return for Laotian ores and concentrated metals, North Korean rolled ferrous metals and labor, and Cambodian rubber.

== Trade with Western industrialized countries ==
The Western industrialized countries include the United States, Canada, Western Europe, Australia, and New Zealand. Soviet trade with industrialized countries, except Finland, consisted of simple purchases paid for on a cash or credit basis, direct exchange of one good for another (Pepsi-Cola for Stolichnaya vodka, for example), or industrial cooperation agreements in which foreign firms participated in the construction or operation of plants in the Soviet Union. In the latter instances, payments were rendered in the form of the output of new plants. By contrast, trade with Finland, which did not have a convertible currency at that time, was conducted through bilateral clearing agreements, much like Soviet trade with its Comecon partners.

In the 1970s and 1980s, the Soviet Union relied heavily on various kinds of fuel exports to earn hard currency, and Western partners regarded the Soviet Union as an extremely reliable supplier of oil and natural gas. In the 1980s, the Soviet Union gave domestic priority to gas, coal, and nuclear power in order to free more oil reserves for export. This was necessary because of higher production costs and losses of convertible currency resulting from the drop in world oil price. The development of natural gas for domestic and export use was also stimulated by these factors. Between 1970 and 1986, natural gas exports rose from 1 percent to 15 percent of total Soviet exports to the West.

Because of the inferior quality of Soviet goods, the Soviet Union was unsuccessful in increasing its exports of manufactured goods. In 1987, only 18 percent of Soviet manufactured goods met world technical standards. As an illustration of these problems in quality, Canadian customers who had purchased Soviet Belarus tractors often found that the tractors had to be overhauled on arrival before they could be sold on the Canadian market. In 1986, less than 5 percent of Soviet exports to the West consisted of machinery. Other Soviet nonfuel exports in the 1990s included timber, exported primarily to Japan, and chemicals, the exports of which grew substantially in 1984 and 1985.

In the 1980s, Soviet imports from Western industrialized countries generally exceeded exports, although trade with the West decreased overall. One-half of Soviet agricultural imports were from developed countries, and these imports made up a considerable portion of total imports from the West. Industrial equipment formed one-quarter of Soviet imports from the West, and iron and steel products, particularly steel tubes for pipeline construction, made up most of the rest. Over the course of the 1980s, high-technology items gained importance as well.

In the 1970s and 1980s, Soviet trade with the Western industrialized countries was more dynamic than Soviet trade with other countries, as trade patterns fluctuated with political and economic changes. In the 1970s, the Soviet Union exchanged its energy and raw materials for Western capital goods, and growth in trade was substantial. Soviet exports jumped 55 percent, and imports jumped 207 percent. The Soviet Union ran a trade deficit with the West throughout this period.

In 1980, the Soviet Union exported slightly more to the West than it imported. After a temporary shortage of hard currency in 1981, the Soviet Union sought to improve its trade position with the industrialized countries by keeping imports at a steady level and by increasing exports. As a result, the Soviet Union began to run trade surpluses with most of its Western partners. Much of the income earned from fuel exports to Western Europe was used to pay off debts with the United States, Canada, and Australia, from which the Soviet Union had imported large quantities of grain.

In 1985 and 1986, trade with the West was suppressed because of heightened east–west political tensions, successful Soviet grain harvests, high Soviet oil production costs, a devalued United States dollar, and falling oil prices. Despite increases in oil and natural gas exports, the Soviet Union's primary hard-currency earners, the country was receiving less revenue from its exports to the West. The Soviet Union sold most of its oil and natural gas exports for United States dollars but bought most of its hard currency imports from Western Europe. The lower value of the United States dollar meant that the purchasing power of a barrel of Soviet crude oil, for example, was much lower than in the 1970s and early 1980s. In 1987, the purchasing power of a barrel of Soviet crude oil in exchange for West German goods had fallen to one-third of its purchasing power in 1984.

With the exception of grain, phosphates used in fertilizer production, and high-technology equipment, Soviet dependence on Western imports historically has been minimal. A growing hard currency debt of US$31 billion in 1986 led to reductions in imports from countries with hard currencies. In 1988, Gorbachev cautioned against dependence on Western technology because it required hard currency that "we don't have." He also warned that increased borrowing to pay for imports from the West would lead to dependence on international lending institutions.

=== United States ===
==== Early trade ====
Founded in 1924, Amtorg Trading Corporation, based in New York, was the main organization governing trade between the USSR and the USA. By 1946, Amtorg organized a multi-million dollar trade. Amtorg handled almost all exports from the USSR, comprising mostly lumber, furs, flax, bristles, and caviar, and all imports of raw materials and machinery for Soviet industry and agriculture. It also provided American companies with information about trade opportunities in the USSR and supplied Soviet industries with technical news and information about American companies. Amtorg was also involved in Soviet espionage against the United States. It was joined, in both its trade and espionage roles, by the Soviet Government Purchasing Commission from 1942 onward.

During Lenin's tenure, Armand Hammer established a pencil factory in the Soviet Union, hiring German craftsmen and shipping American grain into the Soviet Union. Hammer also established asbestos mines and acquired fur trapping facilities east of the Urals. During Lenin's New Economic Policy, Armand Hammer became the mediator for 38 international companies in their dealings with the USSR. Before Lenin's death, Hammer negotiated the import of Fordson tractors into the USSR, which served a major role in agricultural mechanization in the country. Later, after Stalin came to power, additional deals were negotiated with Hammer as an American–Soviet negotiator.

In 1929, Henry Ford made an agreement with the Soviets to provide technical aid over nine years in building the first Soviet automobile plant, GAZ, in Gorky (now Nizhny Novgorod). The plant would construct Ford Model A and Model AA trucks. An additional contract for the construction of the plant was signed with The Austin Company on August 23, 1929. The contract involved the purchase of $30,000,000 worth of knocked-down Ford cars and trucks for assembly during the first four years of the plant's operation, after which the plant would gradually switch to Soviet-made components. Ford sent his engineers and technicians to the Soviet Union to help install the equipment and train the workforce, while over a hundred Soviet engineers and technicians were stationed at Ford's plants in Detroit and Dearborn "for the purpose of learning the methods and practice of manufacture and assembly in the Company's plants".

==== WWII Lend-Lease ====
During WWII, the United States supplied the Soviet Union as part of the Lend-Lease program, amounting to about 4.4 million tons of food supplies, 2.6 million tons of petroleum, 14,000 planes, 44,000 jeeps, 375,000 trucks, 8,000 tractors, 12,700 tanks, 1.5 million blankets, 15 million pairs of army boots, and 106,000 tons of cotton.

==== Détente ====
Trade between the United States and the Soviet Union averaged about 1 percent of total trade for both countries through the 1970s and 1980s. Soviet-American trade peaked in 1979 at US$4.5 billion, exactly 1 percent of total United States trade. The Soviet Union continuously ran a trade deficit with the United States in the 1970s and early 1980s, but from 1985 through 1987 the Soviet Union cut imports from the United States while maintaining its level of exports to balance trade between the two countries.

The pro-Soviet American business magnate Armand Hammer of Occidental Petroleum often mediated trade relations. During détente in July 1972, Armand Hammer negotiated a twenty-year agreement with Brezhnev of the Soviet Union that was signed by Hammer in April 1973 in which the Hammer-controlled firms Occidental Petroleum and Tower International would export to the Soviet Union phosphate, which Occidental mined in northern Florida, in return for the Soviet Union exporting from Odessa and Ventspils through Hammer's firms natural gas that would be converted into ammonia, potash, and urea. The total value of this trade was estimated at $20 billion. The construction of Soviet port facilities, designed by Hammer's firms, was partially financed by the Export-Import Bank as endorsed by Nixon.

Author Daniel Yergin, in his book The Prize, writes that Hammer "ended up as a go-between for five Soviet General Secretaries and seven U.S. Presidents." Hammer had an extensive business relationship with the Soviet Union stretching back to the 1920s with Lenin's approval. According to Christian Science Monitor in 1980, "although his business dealings with the Soviet Union were cut short when Stalin came to power, he had more or less single-handedly laid the groundwork for the [1980] state of Western trade with the Soviet Union." In 1974, Brezhnev "publicly recognized Hammer's role in facilitating East-West trade." By 1981, according to the New York Times in that year, Hammer was on a "first-name basis with Leonid Brezhnev."

In January 1980, after the Soviet intervention in Afghanistan, among the retaliatory measures Jimmy Carter pursued were the embargo of grain against the Soviet Union, and the suspension of high-technology exports to the Soviet Union. In 1980, Carter limited ammonia imports from the Soviet Union.

==== Later years ====
In 1987, total trade between the United States and the Soviet Union amounted to US$2 billion. The Soviet Union exported chemicals, metals (including gold), and petroleum products in addition to fur skins, alcoholic beverages, and fish products to the United States and received agricultural goods—mostly grain—and industrial equipment in return. The value of exports to the Soviet Union in 1987 amounted to US$1.5 billion, three-quarters of which consisted of agricultural products and one-quarter of industrial equipment.

Competition from other parts of the world, improvements in Soviet grain production, and political disagreements between the two countries adversely affected American agricultural exports to the Soviet Union in the 1980s. In 1985 and 1986, trade was the lowest since 1973. The Soviet Union had turned to Canada and Western Europe for one-third of its grain supplies, as well as to Argentina, Eastern Europe, Australia, and China. The United States government price subsidies helped to expand grain exports in 1987 and 1988.

The United States had long linked trade with the Soviet Union to its foreign policy toward the Soviet Union and, especially since the early 1980s, to Soviet human rights policies. In 1949, for example, the Coordinating Committee for Multilateral Export Controls (CoCom) was established by Western governments to monitor the export of sensitive high technology that would improve the military effectiveness of members of the Warsaw Pact and certain other countries. The Jackson-Vanik Amendment, which was attached to the 1974 Trade Reform Act, linked the granting of most-favored-nation to the right of Soviet Jews to emigrate.

In 1987, the United States had reason to reassess its trade policy toward the Soviet Union. The Soviet Union had restructured and decentralized authority for trade under the Ministry of Foreign Trade, made improvements in human rights policies, cooperated in arms control negotiations, and shown a willingness to experiment with joint ventures. Furthermore, the United States government recognized that restrictive trade policies were hurting its own economic interests. In April 1988, Soviet and American trade delegations met in Moscow to discuss possibilities for expanded trade. Through increased trade with the United States, the Soviet Union hoped to learn Western management, marketing, and manufacturing skills. Such skills would increase the ability of the Soviet Union to export manufactured goods, and thus earn hard currency, and would improve its competitiveness on the world market. The delegations declared that Soviet-American cooperation would be expanded in the areas of food processing, energy, construction equipment, medical products, and the service sector.

=== Western Europe ===
In 1966, Brezhnev requested Italian auto firm Fiat to build a factory in Tolyatti, which was completed in 1970. Each year, this factory manufactured 600,000 to 700,000 cars, The project, estimated as having cost $800 million by 1972, produced Zhiguli models. The ensuing company town in Tolyatti became the largest planned industrial center in the USSR.

In the mid-1980s, West European exports to the Soviet Union were marginal, less than 0.5 percent of the combined gross national product of countries of the Organisation for Economic Co-operation and Development. OECD countries provided the Soviet Union with high-technology and industrial equipment, chemicals, metals, and agricultural products. In return, Western Europe received oil and natural gas from the Soviet Union.

Although oil and gas were the primary Soviet exports to Western Europe, they represented only a small percentage of Western Europe's substantial fuel imports: Soviet oil provided 3 percent and natural gas 2 percent of the energy consumed in Western Europe. The completion of the Urengoy-Uzhgorod export pipeline project increased the importance of Soviet natural gas to Western Europe in the second half of the 1980s. In 1984, France, Austria, the Federal Republic of Germany (West Germany), and Italy began receiving natural gas from western Siberia through the pipeline, for which the Soviet Union was paid in hard currency, pumping equipment, and large-diameter pipe. By 1990, the Soviet Union expected to supply 3 percent of all natural gas imported by Western Europe, including 30 percent of West Germany's gas imports.

Unlike the United States, the countries of Western Europe have not viewed trade as a tool to influence Soviet domestic and foreign policies. Western Europe rejected the trade restrictions imposed by the United States after the Soviet invasion of Afghanistan in 1979 and the declaration of martial law in Poland in 1980. From 1980 to 1982, the United States embargoed the supply of equipment for the Urengoy-Pomary-Uzhgorod pipeline, but Western Europe ignored United States pleas to do the same.

Despite the poor relations between the superpowers in the early and mid-1980s, Western Europe tried to improve international relations with the Soviet Union. One major step in this direction was the normalization of relations between Comecon and the European Economic Community (EEC). After fifteen years of negotiations, the EEC approved an accord that established formal relations with Comecon effective June 25, 1988. Although it did not establish bilateral trade relations, the agreement "set the stage" for the exchange of information. This accord marked Comecon's official recognition of the EEC.

=== Japan ===
In 1985, trade with the Soviet Union accounted for 1.6 percent of Japanese exports and 1 percent of Japanese imports; Japan was the Soviet Union's fourth most important Western trading partner. Japan's principal exports to the Soviet Union included steel (approximately 40 percent of Japan's exports to the Soviet Union), chemicals, and textiles. The Soviet Union exported timber, nonferrous metals, rare-earth metals, and fuel to Japan. In 1986, despite a reduction in trade between the two countries, the Soviet Union had a trade deficit with Japan. In 1987, trade dropped another 20 percent.

Numerous controversies have thwarted Soviet-Japanese trade. The Toshiba–Kongsberg scandal, in which Japan was accused of shipping equipment to the Soviet Union that was prohibited by CoCom, caused Japanese-Soviet trade to decrease in 1987. In addition, the Japanese constantly prodded the Soviet Union to return the islands off the Japanese island of Hokkaidō that had come under Soviet control after World War II. For its part, the Soviet Union complained of the trade imbalance and static structure of Japanese-Soviet trade.

In the late 1980s, the Soviet Union tried to increase its exports to Japan and diversify the nature of the countries' relationship. Soviet proposals have included establishing joint enterprises to exploit natural resources in Siberia and the Soviet Far East, specifically, coal in the southern Yakutiya area of Siberia and petroleum on Sakhalin; cooperating in the monetary and credit fields; jointly surveying and studying marine resources and peaceful uses of space; and establishing joint activities in other countries. The Soviet Union also proposed branching out into joint ventures in the chemical and wood chip industries, electronics, machine tools, and fish processing. The first Japanese-Soviet joint enterprise, a wood-processing plant in the Soviet Far East, began operation in March 1988. The Soviet Union provided the raw materials, and Japan supplied the technology, equipment, and managerial expertise.

=== Finland ===
In contrast to the variable trade relationships the Soviet Union has had with other West European countries, its relationship with Finland was somewhat stable because of five-year agreements that regulated trade between the countries. The first was established in 1947, and 1986 marked the beginning of the eighth. Accounting procedures and methods of payment were agreed upon every five years as well by the Bank of Finland and Vneshtorgbank. A steady growth in trade between the two countries occurred throughout the 1970s and 1980s.

In the late 1980s, Finland was the Soviet Union's second most important trading partner among the Western nations, after West Germany. Trade with Finland, however, was based on bilateral clearing agreements rather than on exchange of hard currency used with other Western trading partners. In 1986, the Soviet Union shipped 4 percent of its exports to and received 3 percent of its imports from Finland. Finland provided the Soviet Union with ships, particularly those suited to Arctic conditions; heavy machinery; and consumer goods such as clothing, textiles, processed foodstuffs, and consumer durables. The Soviet Union exported oil, natural gas, and fuel and technology for the nuclear power industry.

The system of bilateral clearing agreements on which Soviet-Finnish trade was based required that any increase in Finnish imports from the Soviet Union be accompanied by a corresponding increase in exports to the Soviet Union in order to maintain the bilateral trade balance. At the beginning of the 1980s, Finland increased its imports of Soviet oil, which allowed it to increase its exports to the Soviet Union. This procedure accounted for the steady growth in Soviet-Finnish trade into the late 1980s. By 1988, about 90 percent of Soviet exports to Finland consisted of oil. Because the Finns imported more oil than they could consume domestically, they reexported it to other Scandinavian and West European countries. The Finns complained in late 1987 and early 1988 of a decline in Soviet ship orders and delinquent payments. The share of Finland's exports to the Soviet Union, which had previously been as high as 25 percent, dropped to 15 percent in 1988.

== Trade with Third World countries ==
The Third World includes those countries the Soviet Union termed "developing countries." This category included those countries of socialist orientation that had some sort of privileged economic affiliation with the Soviet Union, such as Afghanistan, Angola, Iraq, and Nicaragua, but excluded the developing countries ruled by Marxist-Leninist parties, such as Cambodia, Laos, and Vietnam. Soviet trade with the Third World had been marked by two characteristics. First, although the Soviet Union had generally played only a minor role in Third World trade, Soviet imports or exports had formed a large portion of the total trade of some countries. Second, the Soviet Union had concentrated its trade with the Third World in the hands of relatively few partners. For example, in 1987, India, Iran, Iraq, Syria, Argentina, Egypt, Turkey, Afghanistan, Nigeria, and Malaysia together accounted for 75 percent of Soviet imports from, and 80 percent of Soviet exports to the Third World.

Although Soviet trade with the Third World increased in volume from 1965 through 1985, it remained between 13 and 15 percent of total Soviet trade for exports and 10 and 12 percent for imports. The Third World's trade with the Soviet Union, however, decreased in the 1970s and into the 1980s. These data include Cuba, since the only figures available concerning Third World trade with the Soviet Union include Cuba. As a percentage of overall Third World trade, the Soviet Union's share fell from 3.9 percent in 1970 to 2.5 percent in 1981. Deducting Soviet trade with Cuba, which has been considerable, would show an even smaller role played by the Soviet Union in Third World trade. In the late 1980s, the Soviet Union sought arrangements that would allow it to maintain a level of trade that minimized the loss of hard currency.

=== Balance of trade ===
During the 1980s, the Soviet Union exported more to Third World countries than it imported from them. Official Soviet statistics showed a trade deficit for this period, but arms and military equipment sales, which were not reported and are thus termed "unidentifiable" exports, accounted for approximately 50 percent of total exports to the Third World throughout the 1980s. Thus, the Soviet Union's hard-currency balance of trade, including arms sales, with the Third World was positive from 1980 through 1986. In fact, the Soviet Union's positive hard-currency trade balance with the Third World exceeded its hard-currency deficit with the Western industrialized countries in 1985 and 1986. For this reason, the Soviet Union showed an overall positive hard currency trade balance for these years.

Until the mid-1970s, bilateral clearing agreements were the primary means by which the Soviet Union settled accounts with its Third World partners. By the early 1980s, hard-currency payments had become the preferred means of settlement. Clearing agreements were used in less than half of all trade transactions. On occasion, the Soviet Union bartered arms for oil.

=== Composition of trade ===
Not including arms sales, machinery accounted for 20 percent of total sales to the Third World in 1985. Soviet exports of machinery took up an even higher relative share of total sales to Algeria, Iran, Nigeria, Pakistan, the People's Democratic Republic of Yemen (South Yemen), and Turkey. From 1980 through 1984, fuel, mostly oil, made up approximately 33 percent of overall Soviet exports to the Third World, including 50 percent of its exports to Asia and 60 to 70 percent of its exports to Latin America. Since 1985, greater competition on the world market resulting from falling world oil prices and rising Soviet extraction costs has prompted the Soviet Union to try to replace its export of oil with manufactured goods.

The Soviet Union has been the largest arms exporter to the Third World for a number of years. Major arms customers were concentrated in the belt of countries that stretches from North Africa to India, close to the Soviet Union's southern border. Some 72 percent of Soviet weapons exports went to Algeria, India, Iraq, Libya, and Syria. Other important customers included Afghanistan, Angola, Ethiopia, South Yemen, and the Yemen Arab Republic (North Yemen). The Soviet Union lost arms customers in the 1980s, however, when Brazil and Egypt began to expand their arms sales to the Third World. India, which had experienced improvements in its hard currency balance in the 1980s, also started to buy arms from other suppliers. In an effort to retain its share of Indian arms customers, the Soviet Union continued to offer India its most sophisticated weapons at even more attractive rates.

The Soviet Union has long been an importer of Third World agricultural products. These imports increased dramatically after 1980 because of poor Soviet harvests from 1979 into the early 1980s and the United States grain embargo against the Soviet Union in 1980 and 1981. From 1980 to 1985, food and agricultural goods, half of them grain, made up 50 percent of Soviet imports from the Third World. In the first nine months of 1986, the decrease in grain purchases accounted for most of the 22 percent drop in imports from the Third World.

Africa and Latin America supplied most of the food imports other than grain. Throughout the 1980s, food imports steadily rose, but imports from individual countries fluctuated. Because of these fluctuations, the Soviet Union was often considered an unstable trade partner compared with Western customers.

Because the Soviet Union was a major producer and exporter of most of the world's minerals, its import requirements for many other commodities (nonferrous metals, in particular) were sporadic. Nonetheless, the Soviet Union was a stable importer of some minerals, particularly bauxite and phosphate rock. The Soviet Union imported up to 50 percent of its bauxite from Guinea, Guyana, India, Indonesia, and Jamaica. Phosphate rock was abundant in the Soviet Union, but because extraction costs were high, most of this mineral was imported from Morocco and Syria.

A decline in Soviet imports of manufactured goods in the 1970s led Third World countries to pressure the Soviet Union to increase the import of these goods in the 1980s. In 1982, the Soviet demand for Third World manufactures began to rise. By 198,4 manufactured goods, including manufactured consumer goods, made up 25 percent of Soviet imports from the Third World.

Beginning in 1973, in an effort to earn hard currency, the Soviet Union began to import oil from Third World countries for reexport to Western industrialized countries. This activity slowed from 1980 to 1982, recovered in 1983 through 1985, and continued to increase in 1986. Late that year, the Soviet Union signed an agreement with the Organization of Petroleum Exporting Countries (OPEC) that restricted the amount of oil it could buy for reexport. By 1988, this agreement had not cut total Soviet oil receipts, however, because oil was paid to the Soviet Union as compensation in arms sales.

=== Africa, Asia, and Latin America ===
During the 1980s, the geographical pattern of Soviet-Third World trade changed markedly. A decrease in trade with North Africa and the Middle East balanced a substantial increase in trade with sub-Saharan Africa, South Asia, and Latin America.

In 1987, about 50 percent of the Soviet Union's total identified exports to the Third World went to Asia, and India was the Soviet Union's biggest trade partner. In exchange for Soviet oil and oil products, India supplied food, raw agricultural material, clothing, textiles, and machinery. India was also the Soviet Union's sole significant Third World supplier of equipment and advanced technology, e.g., computers and copiers, much of which was produced by Indian subsidiaries of Western multinational corporations. Malaysia, another important partner of the Soviet Union in Asia, was an important supplier of rubber, palm oil, and tin.

From 1980 to 1983, Soviet exports to Africa increased slightly to 30 percent of its Third World exports and decreased thereafter. Imports from Africa fluctuated from 1980 to 1985 but remained at about 25 percent. Nigeria was the Soviet Union's only important trade partner in sub-Saharan Africa, receiving Soviet machinery and exporting cocoa.

Exports to Latin America grew during the 1980s and reached 8 percent in 1985. Latin America's share of Soviet Third World imports was high (40 percent in 1982) because of large imports of Argentine grain. As the Soviet Union's main grain supplier, Argentina was the Soviet Union's most significant import partner in the Third World in 1980, 1981, and 1983. In 1986, the Soviet Union renewed its grain agreement with Argentina for another five years. However, because of a US$11 billion trade deficit with Argentina that the Soviet Union had amassed from 1980 through 1985 and the successful Soviet harvest of 1986, the Soviet Union cut its grain imports from Argentina drastically. In 1986, they were at a six-year low.

From 1960, South Africa's De Beers had a unique arrangement to re-sell Soviet diamonds from Siberia, which ended with a boycott in 1964. Later in 1990, the Soviets made an arrangement to sell diamonds to De Beers through a Swiss subsidiary. By that time, diamonds were the USSR's fifth largest source of export revenue.

=== Countries of socialist orientation ===
The countries of socialist orientation can be categorized into two groups: those that had observer status in Comecon and those that were not observers but had privileged affiliations with Comecon member countries. The Soviet Union's trade with the Third World has always been heavily skewed toward countries of socialist orientation. Soviet aid provided most of the foreign capital for these countries and influenced their domestic economic development significantly. The Soviet Union often profited more politically than economically from this trade: most Soviet surpluses were not repaid but became clearing credit, long-term cooperation credit, or short-term commercial credit.

In 1986, the countries that had observer status in Comecon were Afghanistan, Angola, Ethiopia, Mozambique, Nicaragua, and South Yemen. These countries were all characterized by political instability, low GNP, and low export potential. The share of exports to this group rose from 14 percent of total Soviet identified exports to the Third World in 1980 to 28 percent in the first nine months of 1986. Afghanistan, a recipient of Soviet machinery and military equipment, was the Soviet Union's most significant partner in this group. By contrast, trade with Mozambique and South Yemen was negligible.

Countries that had privileged affiliations with Comecon countries were Algeria, Benin, Burma, Congo, Guinea (until 1984), Iraq, Madagascar, Nicaragua (1979–85), Nigeria, Syria, and Tanzania and, at times, Guinea-Bissau, Mali, Seychelles, and Zimbabwe. Throughout the 1980s, Soviet exports to these countries oscillated, for example, from 27 percent in 1981 to 15 percent in 1983. This fluctuation, as well as fluctuations in imports, was primarily a result of changes in trade with Iraq, a major Soviet arms-for-oil trading partner in the Third World.

=== Trade with the Organization of Petroleum Exporting Countries ===
The Organization of Petroleum Exporting Countries (OPEC), particularly Iraq and Algeria, absorbed the largest share of the Soviet Union's "unidentified" exports. Although Soviet statistics usually showed a very low or negative trade balance with these countries, the balance was probably high because of arms sales. In the 1980s, some OPEC countries, particularly Iran and Iraq, together with Syria, which was not a member of OPEC, exchanged oil for Soviet arms and military equipment. Oil from these countries was resold to the West for hard currency. In the late 1980s, the Soviet Union attempted to increase its exports of nonmilitary goods to these countries. In May 1986, the Soviet Union and Iraq agreed to increase Soviet nonmilitary equipment sales, and in August 1986, an attempt was made to revive Iraqi gas sales.

== Gorbachev's economic reforms ==
When Mikhail Gorbachev delivered his report on the CPSU's economic policy on June 12, 1985, he noted that growth in exports, particularly machinery and equipment, was slow because the poor quality of Soviet goods prohibited them from being competitive on the world market. In the next three years, Gorbachev introduced many changes that would enable the foreign trade complex to better support his economic policy of acceleration. By May 1988, the structure of the Soviet foreign trade complex had been changed, and operations had been dramatically overhauled.

The price reform called for by the Twenty-Seventh Party Congress was an important step in improving Soviet international economic involvement. Soviet officials admitted that pricing was "economically unsubstantiated" and "unrealistic." They understood that although a fully convertible ruble would not be possible for some time, prices that more accurately reflected production costs, supply and demand, and world market prices were essential for developing a convertible currency. The nonconvertible ruble and the Soviet pricing system discouraged Western businessmen who could not accurately project production costs nor easily convert their ruble profits.

The new joint venture law, passed on January 13, 1987, opened up the Soviet economy to foreign participation, particularly in manufacturing. It was believed that the experience gained in such ventures would facilitate integration into the world economy. Specifically, through upgraded production processes, the Soviet Union could export more competitive manufactured goods and decrease its dependency on energy and raw materials to earn hard currency.

In August 1987, the Soviet Union formally requested observer status in the General Agreement on Tariffs and Trade (GATT). The Soviet Union also expressed its desire to join other international economic organizations and establish contacts with other regional groups. A major step in this direction occurred in 1988 when the Soviet Union signed a normalization agreement with the EEC. The Soviet government, however, professed no interest in joining the World Bank or the International Monetary Fund (IMF). Although Soviet officials claimed that the international monetary system "was not managed properly," it is more likely that IMF and World Bank regulations were the obstacles: both institutions required that members' currencies be freely convertible and that members provide accurate information concerning gold sales and economic performance.

Gorbachev transformed the role of foreign trade in the Soviet economy. Whereas imports previously were regarded exclusively as a vehicle to compensate for difficulties in the short term, Soviet economists under Gorbachev declared that imports should be regarded as alternatives to domestic investment and that exports should serve to gauge the technical level of domestic production. Foreign economic ties were to support growth in production beyond the capacities of the domestic economy. The Soviet Union could thus take a place in the world market that was commensurate with its scientific and technical progress and political weight.

== Banks ==
The Soviet Union controlled a number of banks abroad. The banks were used in foreign trade, espionage, money laundering and funding of Communist parties.

Examples:

- Moscow Narodny Bank in London
- Banque Commerciale pour l'Europe du Nord, also called Eurobank, in Paris
- Garantie- und Kreditbank für den Osten in Berlin
- Ost-West Handelsbank in Frankfurt
- Wozchod Handelsbank in Zurich
- Donau Bank in Vienna
- East-West United Bank in Luxembourg
