= Andrey Akimov =

Russian businessman

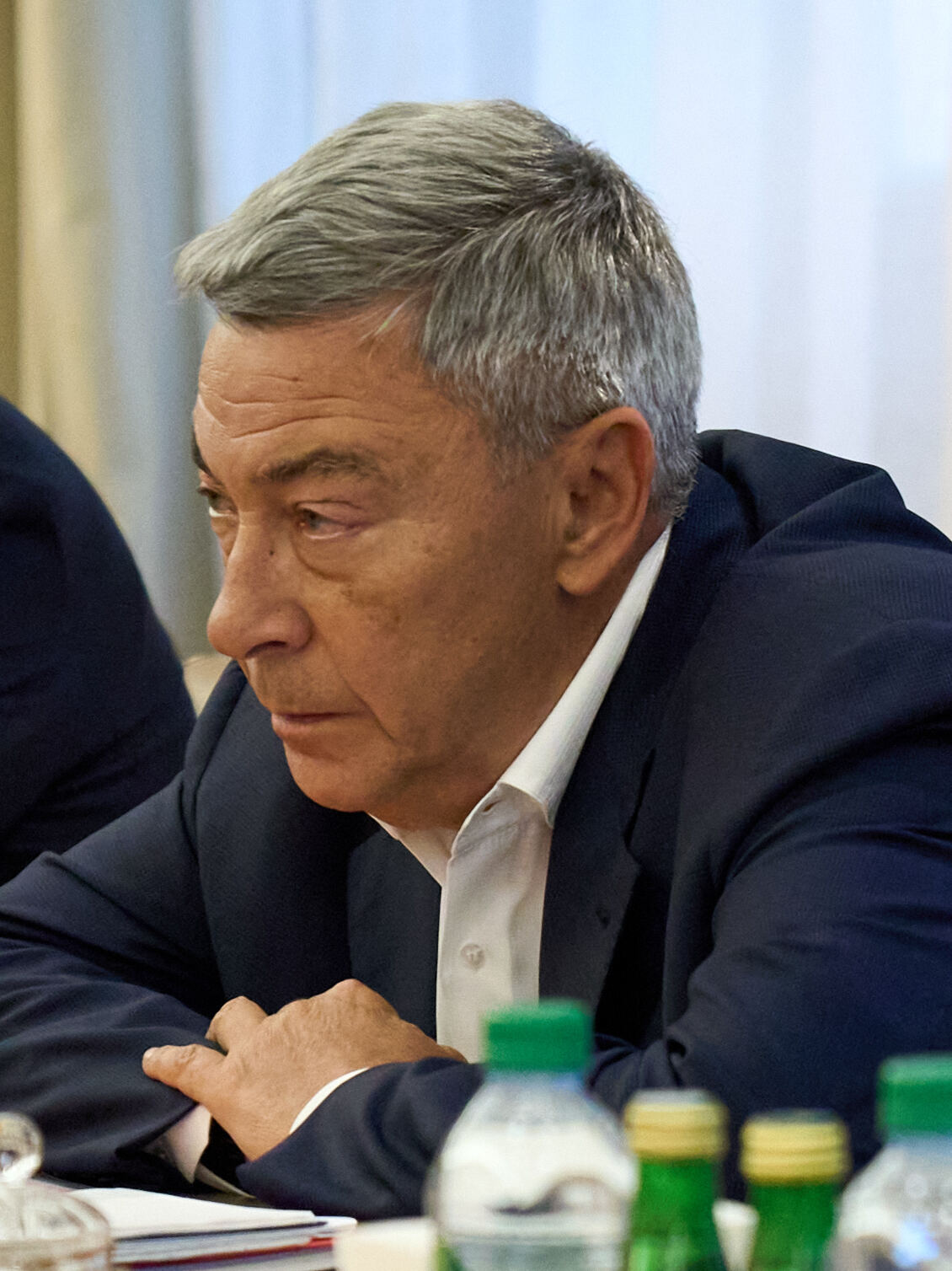
- Born: Andrey Igorevich Akimov; 22 September 1953 (age 73); Leningrad, Soviet Union
- Occupation: Banker

Andrey Igorevich Akimov (in Russian: Андре́й И́горевич Аки́мов, born 22 September 1953 in Leningrad, Soviet Union) is the chairman of the management board of Gazprombank (open joint-stock company). He is believed to be a former KGB agent with the rank of general and a member of the Russian Intelligence Community.

== Early life and education ==
Akimov was born in Leningrad in 1953, but, when he was three months old, his family moved to Moscow. His father was a military engineer that developed weapons for the USSR Ministry of Defense, and his mother was a mathematics teacher. He graduated from a secondary school in Moscow that specialized in English. At the Moscow Financial Institute, he became friends with both Valery Lyakin (Note: Valery Vitalievich Lyakin (Russian: Валерий Витальевич Лякин; born 7 September 1953) became a member of the management board of Donau Bank from December 1989 to December 1991 in one source heading it from November 1990 until November 1992 in another source and later became chairman of the board of VTB Bank (Deutschland) AG in Frankfurt am Main which was formerly known as Ost-West Handelsbank.) and Vladimir Dmitriev and earned his degree in 1975, studying international economics, finance and banking.

== Career ==
=== Vneshtorgbank ===
From 1974 to 1987, Andrey Akimov was employed in at the Foreign Trade Bank of the USSR (Vneshtorgbank) at senior positions heading the financial operations department, which was involved with securities, of VTB USSR until 1985. In September 1975, he participated with the Soviet Foreign Trade Ministry (Russian: советский Минвнешторг) during the negotiations with Japan culminating in an agreement with the 1974 established Japanese company Sakhalin Sekiyu Kaihatsu Kyoreku Kabushiki Kaisha (Sodeco) (Japanese: サハリン石油開発協力) for the development of the Sakhalin-1 field on Sakhalin Island, (Note: The Japanese financing of the development of Sakhalin-1 led to the discovery of the oil and gas fields at Odoptu, Chayvo and Arkutun-Dagi on its northeast portion of the Sakhalin shelf.) and, in 1977 for his first trip outside of the Soviet Union, he travelled to Japan as a government expert and an employee of Vneshtorgbank to negotiate trade in consumer goods and large-diameter pipes with Japanese officials. In 1978, he had a six-month internship at the East-West United Bank in Luxembourg, and, in 1981, he went to Sweden and negotiated a $100 million loan with the export agency. He travelled to many places after his 1981 success in Sweden including many trips to Switzerland to the famous Zurich based Sovzagranbank "Voskhod Handelsbank" (Russian: совзагранбанке «Восход Хандельсбанк») (Wozсhod Handelsbank), which was headed by Yuri Karnaukh, in support of gold trades apparently transporting gold under aircraft passenger seats, according to Nikolai Krotov, until the collapse of the Swiss bank in 1984. From 1985 to 1987, he held a post, which is usually given to an undercover KGB agent, as Deputy Director General of the Soviet Vneshtorgbank branch in Zurich (Switzerland). From 1987 to November 1990, he held a post, which is usually given to an undercover KGB agent, as the Director General of the Soviet-controlled Donau Bank in Vienna (Austria) at the same time Alexander Medvedev worked at Donau Bank. During this time, Donau Bank allegedly serviced very large debts of Bulgaria and, which the Austrian Die Presse wrote at the time, was "adherence to an overly expansive business strategy". In the spring of 1990, Bulgaria declared a moratorium on servicing its external debt.

=== IMAG GmbH ===
From January 1991 to 20 November 2002, he was a managing director of the Swiss financial company IMAG GmbH in Vienna (Austria), which specialized in financing the oil and natural gas industry, and was regular advisor to the chairman of the management board of the newly created Russian Vneshtorgbank. (Note: Alexander Medvedev, who is not related to Dmitry Medvedev, was Akimov's junior partner at IMAG GmbH.) During the 1990s, he worked closely with the administration of the Governor of St. Petersburg Anatoly Sobchak and especially Vladimir Putin to provide more than $1 billion in foreign finance for the reconstruction of the Kirishi oil refinery (Russian: Киришинефтеоргсинтез), which is the only oil refinery in northwest Russia and is the largest oil refinery in Russia based upon the amount of fuel produced. In 1992, his IMAG GmbH organized the financing from foreign banks for the Andrey Katkov (Russian: Андрей Катков), Yevgeny Malov (Russian: Евгений Малов), Adolf Smirnov (Russian: Адольф Смирнов) and Gennady Timchenko associated oil trader Kinex which, in 1993, the St. Petersburg mayor's office transferred oil export quotas which were coming from the Kirishi oil refinery to Kinex and, later, this allowed Timchenko to establish the oil trader Gunvor. (Note: All settlements for the Kirishi oil traders was handled by Bank Rossiya.) Upon the establishment of RosUkrEnergo (Russian: РосУкрЭнерго), many top managers at the Moscow office of the Swiss firm IMAG GmbH moved to Gazprombank.

At IMAG, Akimov had a mandate from the Supreme Economic Council under the Presidium of the Supreme Council of the Russian Federation "in order to attract loans and investments in the Russian economy" (Russian: «в целях привлечения кредитов и инвестиций в российскую экономику»). Through IMAG, Akimov participated in the Russian privatization project including attracting investment from Bear Stearns for AvtoVAZ instead of the traditional Soviet Union supporter Fiat, investment from Kohlberg, Kravis, Roberts & Co (KKR) for KamAZ, and Bear Sterns for Tomskneft. (Note: From 1994 to 1998, Austrian and University of Vienna graduate Wolfgang Skribot worked under Akimov at IMAG, then worked in the European division of Enron, and later worked with Boris Fyodorov, Charles Ryan and Ilya Sherbovich as the director at the United Financial Group (UFG) (Russian: «Объединенной финансовой группы» (ОФГ)) until one month after Gazprombank (GPB) acquired its stake in Mosenergo (Russian: «Мосэнерго») in 2003 after which Skribot began working at GPB. As of 2022, Skribot is a director at the London-based SEFE Marketing and Trading Ltd., which formerly was a unit of Gazprom PJSC.)

=== Gazprombank (GPB) ===
In November 2002, Akimov has taken up a post of the chairman of the management board of the GPB (OJSC). In January 2005, Sergei Ivanov (Russian: Сергей Иванов), who is the son of Sergei Ivanov and was Akimov's assistant to the chairman of the board at Gazprombank, became the vice president of Gazprombank. Through Gazprombank, Akimov, Michael Hason, who is president of Liechtenstein-registered CAP Holding, a deputy chairman the Liechtenstein Sygma Bank and involved with a Martin Schlaff associated Latvian oil company, Martin Schlaff, who is associated with the Vienna based bank BAWAG also transliterated as BAVAG (Russian: банк «БАВАГ») and Robert Novikovsky also transliterated as Nowikovsky or Novikov (Russian: Роберт Новиковский), who was the chairman of the board of Baltic Holding (Russian: «Балтик Холдинг»), formed Yurimex also transliterated as Jurimex (Russian: «Юримекс») which is co-located with the Martin Schlaff associated firm Getex. Yurimex (Jurimex) later became Centrex (Russian: «Центрекс»).

=== Krasny Oktyabr ===
Following the bankruptcy of Krasny Oktyabr in 2009 in which the Andrei Borodin led Bank of Moscow was a large creditor, Akimov, as the interim manager of the plant, appointed the Ukrainian Dmitro Gerasimenko, who is the owner of Dieg-Impex LLC (Russian: ООО «Диег-Импэкс»), to be executive director of Krasny Oktyabr (Note: Dmitro Gerasimenko, who began his career with Dneprospetsstal (Russian: «Днепроспецстал»), placed numerous persons from Dneprospetsstal at positions at Krasny Oktyabr including his mother Svetlana Gerasimenko, who became financial director, Eduard Shifrin, who worked with Svetlana Gerasimenko at Dneprospetsstal, Vadim Leibenzon, who Gerasimenko calls his "right hand" and in the early 1990s led the steel shop at Dneprospetsstal and became general director of Dneprospetsstal in 1998-2001 and 2003-2004, and Konstantin Ryabov, who became the president of Red October International and was very close to Viktor Pinchuk who had been a co-owner of Dneprospetsstal until 2008.) and who in November 2018 "sold" the plant to Pavel Krotov. (Note: Pavel Krotov is a friend of Oleg Deripaska and Ramzan Kadyrov.)

== Corporate boards ==
Since December 2006, Akimov is a member of the Novatek Board of Directors. Since June 2011, he is a member of the Gazprom Board of Directors. He is a member of the supervisory board of the CSKA ice hockey club.

== Awards ==
Awarded the Order of Honor (2008), Order for Merit to the Fatherland, 4th Class (2013), and the Order of Alexander Nevsky (2017).

== Sanctions ==
In April 2018, the United States imposed sanctions on him and 23 other Russian nationals during the war in Donbas. Following Russia's 2022 invasion of Ukraine, Akimov was sanctioned by the UK.

He was sanctioned by the UK government in 2022 in relation to the Russo-Ukrainian War.

== Personal life ==
In Russian media, his romantic partner has previously been identified as painter Marianna Chaykina (Russian: Марианна Чайкина).

The Pandora Papers leaks revealed that Akimov owned at least eight shell companies over the period 2007–2018 which were registered in the British Virgin Islands (BVI) and some of the companies were co-owned by Marianna Chaykina.

As of December 2021, Akimov has been married since September 2021 to an unknown woman identified as an ex-aviation worker.
