= Banque Commerciale pour l'Europe du Nord – Eurobank =

Former bank in France

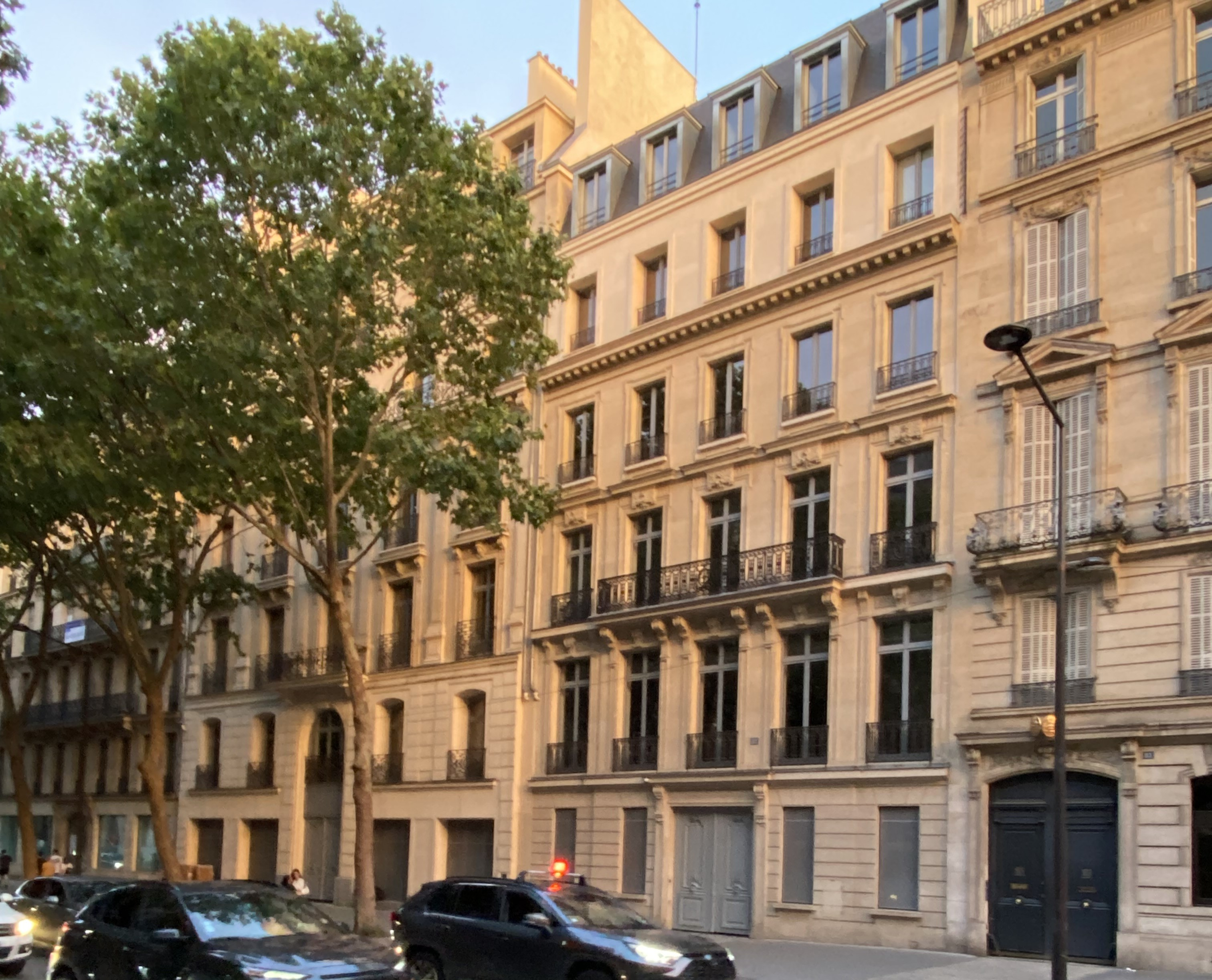
Former head office of BCEN-Eurobank at 79-81, boulevard Haussmann in Paris

Banque Commerciale pour l’Europe du Nord (French pronunciation: [bɑ̃k kɔmɛʁsjal puʁ løʁɔp dy nɔʁ], BCEN) or Banque Commerciale pour l'Europe du Nord – Eurobank (BCEN-Eurobank) was a Soviet-controlled bank in Paris, founded in 1921 by wealthy Russian emigres and supported by the Council of People's Commissars (SovNarKom) (Russian: Совнарком) through Leonid Krasin who, in 1925, sold their stakes to the Soviet Union. It maintained correspondent accounts with Western banks to secure lines of credit for facilitating Soviet imports into that country in which the correspondent account is located. Also, these correspondent accounts performed foreign currency exchange for the Kremlin.

== History ==
During the 1920s and 1930s, Soviet and numerous foreign sources referred to this bank as the Aero Bank (Russian: «Аеробанк») or Airbank in Paris (Russian: «Эйробанк» в Париже) and not the Aero-Bank SA which was a branch of the German bank Aerobank, which was known as the Bank der Deutschen Luftfahrt AG (BDL), and established in Paris by Nazi Germany during its occupation.

The Soviet Union used the bank to manage Spain's gold reserves during the Spanish Civil War.

After the fall of the Soviet Union, many persons involved with BCEN-Eurobank became leaders in Russian economy, banking, and finance.

The 1993 established Moscow bank "Evrofinance" was a subsidiary of Eurobank.

During the 1990s, BCEN – Eurobank was involved in the looting of Russia.

In 2005, Russia's Vneshtorgbank became the major shareholder. Later, Vneshtorgbank changed its name to VTB Bank, and BCEN-EUROBANK name was changed to VTB Bank (France) SA.

== Operations ==
Eurobank participated in foreign currency exchange and so-called Eurocurrency markets and was a leader in Eurodollar lending. In December 1973, Eurobank and Credit Lyonnais formed the Societe pour la Promotion Europeenne du Leasing (Promolease) based in Paris to promote and finance leasing operations for Soviet heavy construction equipment, Soviet snowplows, Soviet machine tools, Soviet Lada vehicles, and Czechoslovak Škoda Auto vehicles.

The Soviet Union supplied funds through Eurobank to the French Communist Party (PCF). (Note: Leonid Georgievich Kucheruk (Russian: Леонид Георгиевич Кучерук; born Agronomic, Vinnytsia Raion, Vinnytsia Oblast, Ukrainian SSR, Soviet Union died 22 December 1996 Minsk, Belarus) managed one of the financial links between the Soviet Union and French Communist Party (PCF). He had fought in the Soviet War in Afghanistan, worked for the magazine Sovetsky Soyuz in Mexico as his cover for his KGB activities, and was a KGB Colonel when died of wounds inflicted during torture. His close associate in Mexico was the intelligence officer and photographer also with Sovetsky Soyuz Yuri Korolev (Russian: Юрий Королев) who died on 8 November 1994 from injuries inflicted during torture. On 27 January 1997, Vadim Osipovich Biryukov (Russian: Вадим Осипович Бирюков), who was a KGB officer, was a colleague of both Korolev and Kucheruk, and was a deputy director general of the magazine Business People (Russian: «Деловые люди»), died from injuries inflicted during torture.)

The bank had its offices at 77, 79, and 81, boulevard Haussmann in Paris.

== Other associated banks ==
VTB has the western subsidiaries of the Central Bank of Russia and, before the dissolution of the Soviet Union, the daughters of the Soviet Union's Gosbank which were the Banque commerciale pour l'Europe du Nord or BCEN-Eurobank in Paris, Moscow Narodny Bank in London, Ost-West Handelsbank in Frankfurt, Donau Bank in Vienna, and East-West United Bank in Luxembourg. (Note: Following the February and March 2022 sanctions issued against VTB and its subsidiaries which include the former daughter banks of the Soviet Union's State Bank Gosbank and later the Central Bank of Russia, EWUB in Luxembourg has become the principal Russian overseas bank in Europe after Gazprombank's liquidation. As of the end of March 2022, the Vladimir Yevtushenkov (Russian: Владимир Петрович Евтушенко) controlled Sistema and its subsidiary East-West United Bank (EWUB) in Luxembourg have not been sanctioned due to Russian interference in Ukraine.)

Eurobank was associated with Eurogrefi (Paris), RTD France (Paris), Evrofinance (Moscow), Wozchod Handelsbank AG (Switzerland) and others.

== Key people ==
- Dimitri Navachine, Director General (1927–1929)
- Thomas Alibegov, Director General (1982–1987)
- Yury Ponomaryov, CEO, chairman of the Board of Directors (1988–1998)

== See also ==
- Foreign trade of the Soviet Union
- Banking in the Soviet Union
- List of banks in France
