= Vnesheconombank =

Vnesheconombank or Vneshekonombank (Russian: Внешэкономбанк) is shorthand for the Bank for Foreign Economic Affairs, established in 1988 from the former Foreign Trade Bank of the USSR. It may refer to:

- Vnesheconombank (USSR), a Soviet bank in activity from 1988 to 1991 and subsequently restructured
- Vnesheconombank (Russia), a Russian state-owned bank
