= Ingosstrakh =

Russian insurance company

- Type: Joint-stock company
- Industry: Insurance
- Founded: 1947
- Headquarters: Moscow, Russia
- Key people: Michail Volkov, CEO
- Revenue: $1.44 billion (2018)
- Net income: $105 million (2018)
- Total assets: $2.57 billion (2018)
- Total equity: $1.09 billion (2018)
- Website: ingos.ru

IPJSC Ingosstrakh (Russian: СПАО «Ингосстра́х») is one of the major insurance companies of Russia, as well as a public joint-stock company. Headquartered in Moscow, Ingosstrakh is the legal successor of the Chief Agency of Foreign Insurance of the USSR, founded in 1947. In 1972, it transformed into a stock company with 100% government shares. It went private in 1992.

The first subsidiary foreign companies were established the Blackbaltsea (Russian: Блекбалси) in London in 1924 (Note: After its establishment in 1924, Blackbalsea (Russian: Блекбалси) conducted espionage operations for Soviet Union interests in London. In 1939, the Chekist and later KGB or GRU Andrey Ilyich Dubonosov (Russian: Андрей Ильич Дубоносов; 1900 – 1978) went to London and worked at the Black Sea and Baltic Insurance Company (Blackbaltsea) (Russian: «Блэкбалтси») insuring British shipping to Russia under Lend-Lease until the end of the war in 1945. The staff at Blackbalsea in London worked work closely with the Main Directorate of Soviet Property Abroad (GUSIMZ) (Russian: Главное управление советского имущества за рубежом (ГУСИМЗ)). Previously from 1930 to 1934, Dubonosov was stationed in East Asia as a GRU agent of the Red Army and worked in the Cheka's Special Department (OO) (Russian: Особого отдела (OO)) under the leadership of the military counterintelligence Chekist (Russian: военная контрразведка) Sergei Mikhailovich Shpigelglas (Russian: Сергей Михайлович Шпигельглас; 1897–1941) who, as a member of the Cheka's Special Department (OO), headed its financial department (Russian: начальник сметного (финансового) отдела ОО ВЧК). Dubonosov worked in financial structures first with the Harbin branch of Dalbank and later with the Shanghai branch of Dalbank, which closed in May 1950, during which time he organised London's Moscow Narodny Bank's take over of the two branches, financed Bolshevik activities through gold trading in Shanghai and often met with other members of Soviet intelligence to exchange packages of money in return for packages of information including Richard Sorge, who departed for Moscow on 12 November 1932, the Red Army Military Intelligence resident (Russian: резидентурой Разведупра РККА) K. M. Rimm (Russian: К. М. Римм; 1891–1937) codename "Paul" (Russian: «Паул») until "Paul" departed from Shanghai in August 1933 when Ya. G. Bronin (Russian: Я. Г. Бронин; 1900–1984) codname "Abram" (Russian: «Абрам») became the new resident in the Shanghai. While Dubonosov was in London from 1939 to 1945, he was on the board of directors of London's Moscow Narodny Bank and later, from 1959 to 1967, he returned to London's Moscow Narodny Bank, spearheaded most of the gold trades between the Soviet government and the London gold market and increased the bank's capital to the largest overseas Gosbank. From 1971 to 1874, Dubonosov was chairman of Ost-West Handelsbank in Frankfurt.) and the Black Sea-Baltic Insurance Joint Stock Company (SOVAG) or also transliterated as SOFAG (Russian: СОФАГ) (German: Die Schwarzmeer und Ostsee Versicherungs-Aktiengesellschaft, SOVAG) (Russian: Черноморско-Балтийское страховое акционерное общество SOFAG) in Hamburg on 7 July 1927. (Note: In 2007, Ingosstrakh and the foreign economic enterprise RAO Gazprom "Gazexport" were the main shareholders of SOFAG.) In Hamburg, SOFAG's sphere of activity included Austria, Czechoslovakia, Poland, the Scandinavian states and countries bordering Russia. In London, Blackbalsea covered the rest of the Europe. General representative offices of Gosstrakh (Russian: Госстрах), and later Ingosstrakh, were opened in Harbin and Tehran. (Note: Gosstrakh (Russian: Госстрах) provided insurance support for the Soviet trade mission in Germany, Russia House or Soviet House, also known as the All-Russian Cooperative Limited Liability Company "ARCOS" (Russian: ООО Всероссийское Кооперативное Общество, «АРКОС»), and Tsentrosoyuz in London, and Amtorg in New York with long-term agreements with foreign insurance companies.) Four representative offices of Ingosstrakh operate in the foreign countries – Azerbaijan, Kazakhstan, India and China. In 2007, PPF Beta Ltd, managed by the Czech group PPF Investments, became one of the owners of Ingosstrakh. In January 2007 the PPF Group together with the large global insurer Generali (Italy) created the holding company Generali PPF Holding to develop the insurance operations in the countries of Eastern and Central Europe. All PPF insurance assets in Russia were transferred to this holding, including a stake in Ingosstrakh. In January 2013, the insurance business was split between PPF and Generali, according to the terms of the transaction, the holding's share in Ingosstrakh was transferred to the Italian insurance group.

== Company history ==
- 16 November 1947: On this day the Council of Ministers of the USSR signed a decree No. 3819-1281с "On the Establishment of the Agency of Foreign Insurance of USSR (Ingosstrakh) as Part of the Agency of Foreign Operations (UINO) of Gosstrakh of USSR".
- 2 June 1948: "Regulation on the Agency of Foreign Insurance of USSR (Ingosstrakh)" was approved by the decree of the Council of Ministers of the USSR.
- 20 July 1972: The Council of Ministers of the USSR issued a decree which provided Ingosstrakh with the status of a Chief Agency of Foreign Insurance of USSR. At the same time, Ingosstrakh acquired a new legal status: it gained the right to operate abroad and if necessary at home as well as a joint-stock insurance company.
- 1996: An edition of the company's new Articles of Association with a new name "Otkrytoye strakhovoye aktsionyernoye obshestvo Ingosstrakh", in the English language: «Ingosstrakh Joint Stock Insurance Company Ltd.», abbreviated name in the English language: Ingosstrakh Insurance Company Ltd.
- November 2010: Ingosstrakh has fully settled the insurance event, related to the destruction of towers of the World Trade Center in New York as a result of the terrorist attack which occurred on 11 September 2001. Allianz Global Risks U.S. Insurance Company acted as a risk insurer in this case. Ingosstrakh participated in its handling under the reinsurance agreement with a retrocedent, a French insurance company SCOR SE.
- April 2014: 2 April 2014. Mikhail Volkov was elected as the chief executive officer of Ingosstrakh Insurance Company for 3 years at the meeting of the board of directors of Ingosstrakh Insurance Company. He also became the President of the company's Board of Management.
- October 2018: International rating agency Standard & Poor's Global Ratings (S&P) increased long-term credit ratings of the issuer and financial sustainability rating of the insurance company Ingosstrakh from BB+ to BBB−. The outlook was Stable. Agency made such a decision due to high capitalization figures and enlarged investment portfolio quality of the company corresponding to BBB rating requirements.
- December 2018: RAEX (Expert Rating Agency) confirmed the financial safety rating of Ingosstrakh PJSIC to be ruAAA. Rating outlook was stable.

== Ratings ==
Good business standing of Ingosstrakh was rated by the International rating agency Standard & Poor's: the Ingosstrakh long-term credit rating of the contractor and the financial strength rating was at the level "BBB−", national scale rating was "ruAA+", rating forecast was "Stable". The Russian rating agency Expert RA reaffirmed Ingosstrakh's highest financial stability rating at A++. For the first time the insurer received such rating in 2002.
