= Vneshtorgbank =

Vneshtorgbank, an abbreviation for Russian Банк для внешней торговли (lit. 'Bank for Foreign Trade'), may refer to:

- the Foreign Trade Bank of the USSR, a Soviet bank extant under that name from 1924 to 1988
- VTB Bank, a Russian bank established in 1990
