= Eurofinance =

Eurofinance may refer to:

- EuroFinance - a division of Economist Group
- Evrofinance Mosnarbank - a large Russian commercial bank
