= Moscow Narodny Bank =

1911–1917 bank in the Russian Empire

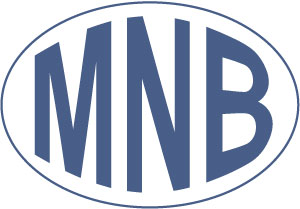

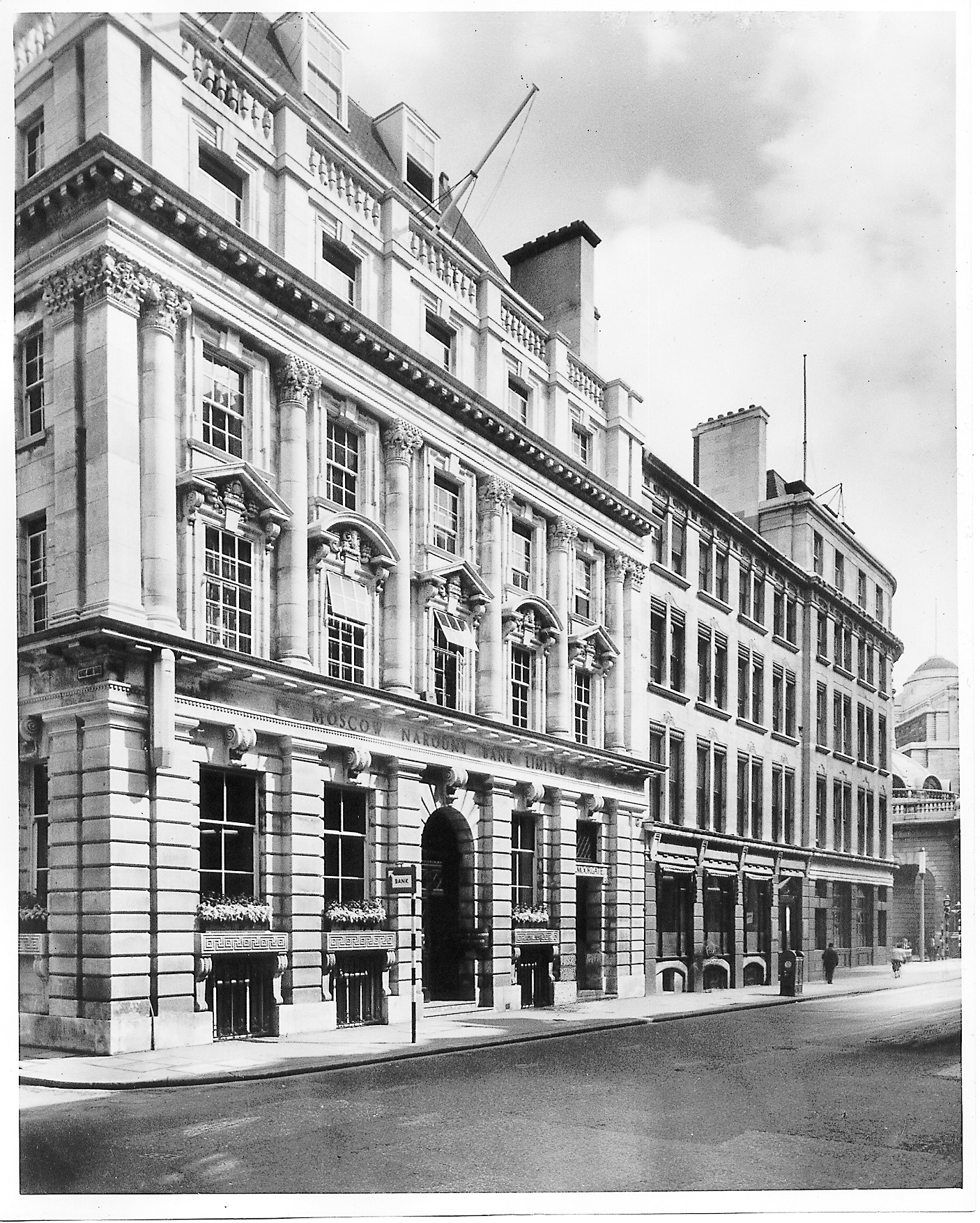
- MNB building in Moorgate, London
- Industry: Financial services
- Founded: March 1911; 115 years ago
- Defunct: December 2005
- Headquarters: Moscow (until 1917); London (from 1915)
- Key people: Andrey I. Dubonosov, Igor G. Suvorov, Yury V. Ponomaryov
- Products: Asset management, corporate banking, investment banking
- Total assets: over $1 billion (1977)

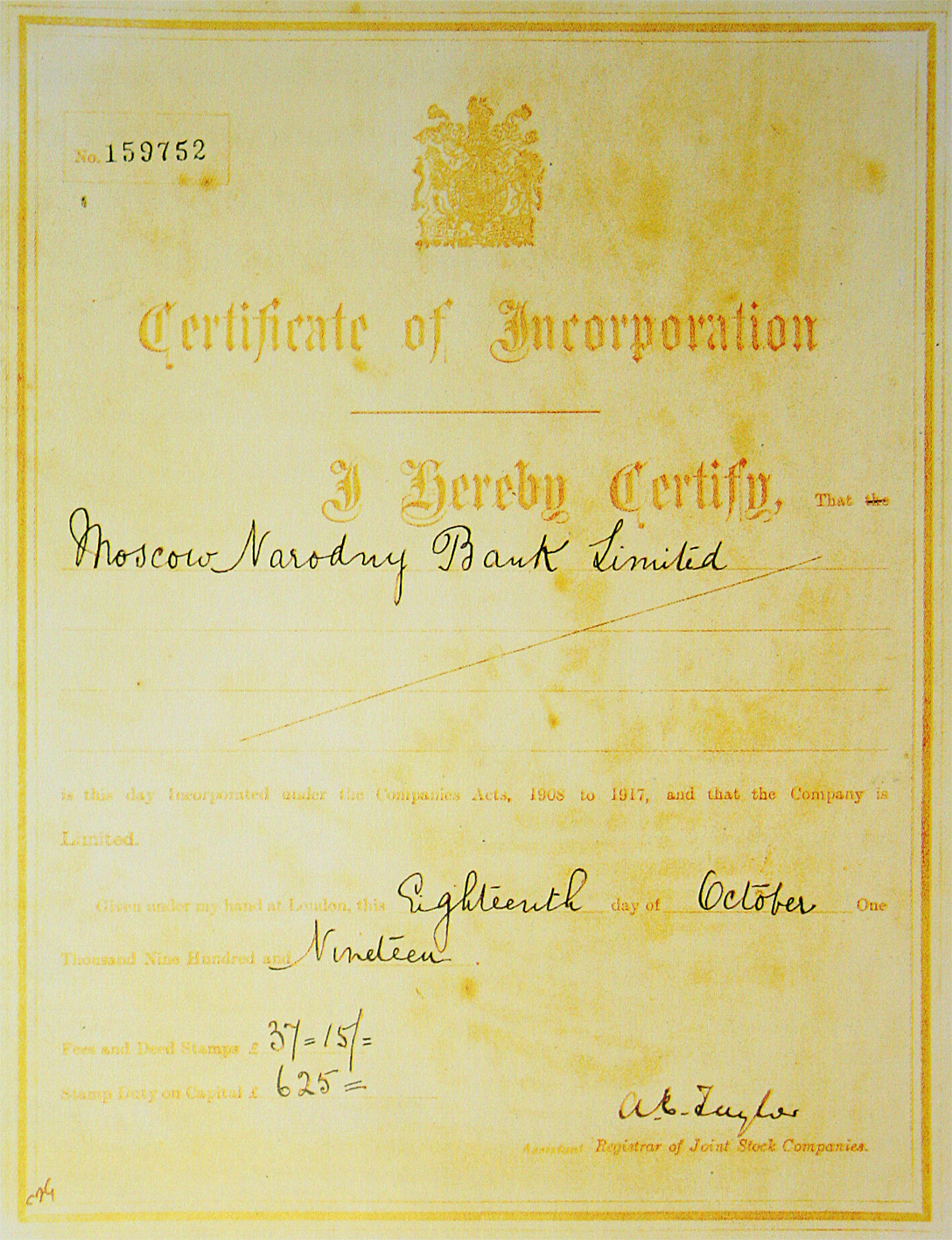
Certificate of Incorporation of MNB as an English company

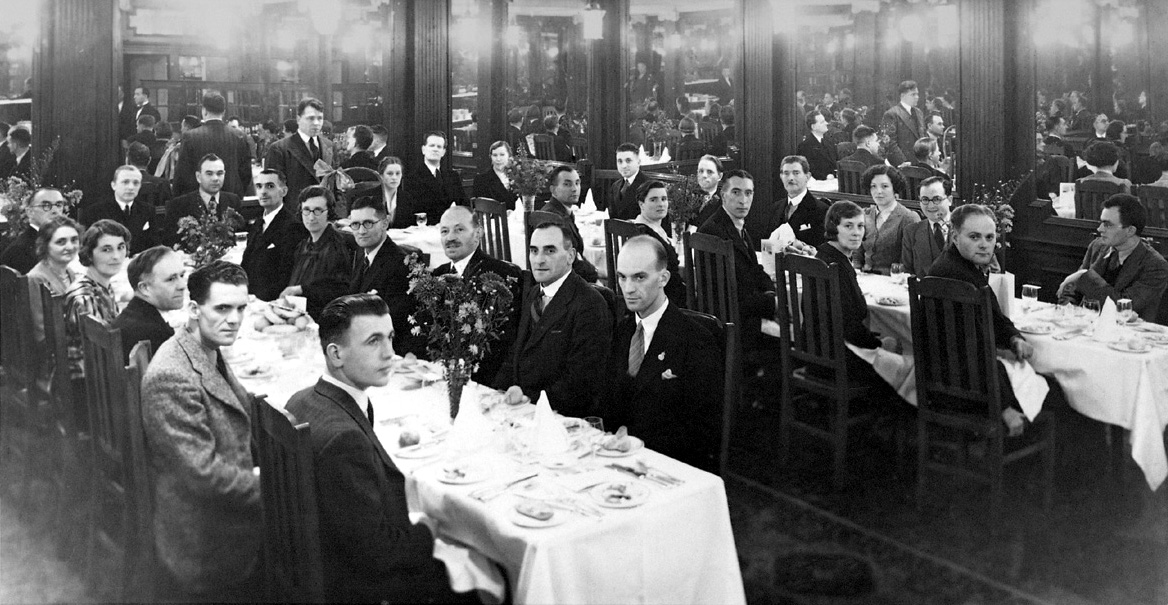
MNB 20th anniversary dinner

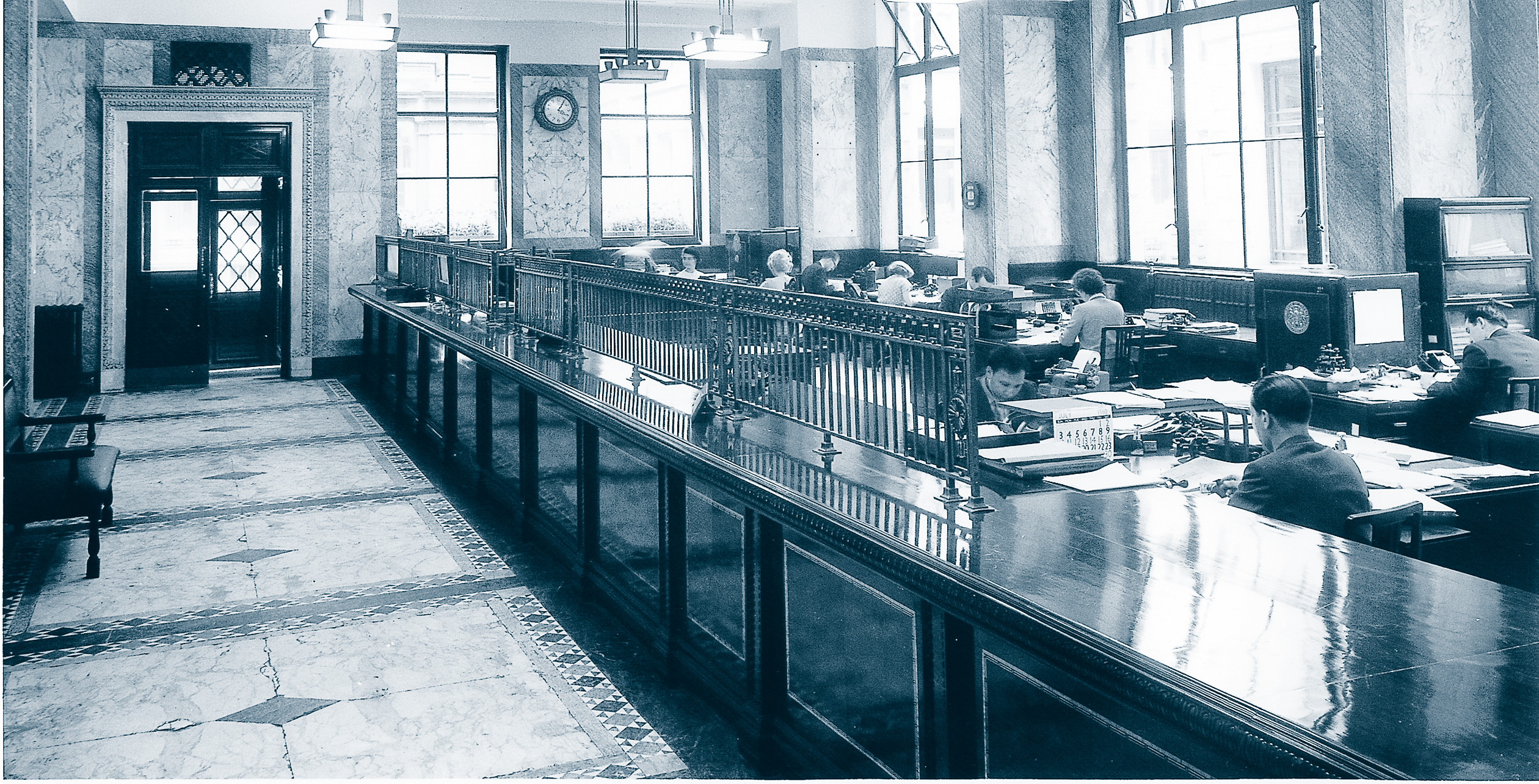
MNB office at 4 Moorgate

Moscow Narodny Bank (MNB, lit. 'National Bank of Moscow') was a bank active in the Russian Empire from 1911 to 1917, whose London affiliate was maintained after the Russian Revolution to serve the financial needs of the Soviet Union. It survived the early phase of post-Communist transition and was eventually absorbed by VTB in 2005.

== Russian Empire ==
Moscow Narodny Bank was established under the Articles of Association approved by the Ministry of Finance on March 3, 1911 (published in the Collection of Edicts and Executive Orders of the Government of Russia on September 29, 1911). It opened for business in Moscow on May 9, 1912.

The idea of setting up such a bank occurred at the First All-Russian Convention of Representatives of Cooperative Establishments in 1908 and was endorsed afterwards by annual conventions of cooperators. The purpose of setting-up and operation of the Moscow Narodny Bank was: “to deliver monetary funds to small loan institutions and all kinds of cooperative enterprises in order to ease their turnovers”.

The governing body of the Bank was determined by the Board, which was located in Moscow, the controlling body was the council. The Bank's fixed capital at its establishment was 1 million rubles, divided into 4,000 shares with a par value of 250 rubles.

The founders were: a prominent figure in the cooperative movement N. P. Gibner, chairman of the committee of rural savings partnerships, nobleman V. A. Pereleshin, agronomist P. A. Sadyrin, agronomist V. I. Anisimov, a peasant deputy of the State Duma of the 1st convocation from the Moscow province A. P. Pavlov, state councilors E. D. Maksimov, A. V. Vasiliev, I. P. Grundsky, peasant A. P. Pavlov. N. P. Gibner became the first chairman of the board, A. V. Pereleshin became the chairman of the board, and the merchant A. N. Balakshin, A. N. Antsyferov and T. I. Buynov became deputies.

The original building of the bank was located at Myasnitskaya Street in Moscow. Moscow Narodny Bank became a major mortgage lending facilitator in Russia with a leading position in the small loan institution system.

The bank was managed in accordance with the principles of cooperative banking. In accordance with the charter, the Council of the Bank was to consist of representatives of cooperatives by 2/3. In the general meeting, shareholders could not have more than 5 votes, regardless of the number of shares.

The Moscow Narodny Bank entered into an agreement with the Moscow Union of Consumer Societies, according to which the bank purchased fertilizers, agricultural machinery and seeds. The Bank participated in the creation of cooperative associations engaged in the purchase and sale of various goods.

Moscow Narodny Bank had 12 branches, agencies and commission offices in different towns and cities of European Russia, Siberia, Far East and Caucasus, including Petrograd, Vladivostok, Perm, Tiflis (Tbilisi), Irkutsk, Samarkand, Tashkent and Bukhara.

By 1917, the bank's own funds amounted to 4 million rubles.

Bank agencies were established in London (1915) and New York City (1916). In 1916 the London agency was reorganized into a full subsidiary.

== Revolution and reorganization ==
Moscow Narodny Bank was declared state property on the basis of the Decree of the All-Russian Central Executive Committee of December 14, 1917, on the nationalization of banks. By the Decree of the People's Commissariat of Finance of December 2, 1918, the Moscow Narodny Bank was nationalized with its transformation into a special cooperative department of the People's Bank of the RSFSR. On October 18, 1919, the London subsidiary was reorganized into an independent bank also named Moscow Narodny Bank, acting in accordance with English Law. Moscow Narodny Bank was announced to be in public ownership under the decree of the All-Russian Central Executive Committee of December 14, 1917, on bank nationalization.

Nationalization of Moscow Narodny Bank was executed by the Executive Order of the People's Finance Committee of December 2, 1918, whereupon the bank was reorganized into a special cooperative department of the Narodny Bank of the Russian Soviet Federative Socialist Republic.

In 1919, due to disruption of relations with the parent company due to its nationalization in Russia, the London branch was incorporated as a British legal entity in order to protect it. The bank heads, Jean Bubnov and Konstantin Popov, submitted an application to register it as an English limited liability company, which was registered in London on October 18, 1919 as a company of England and Wales under number No.159752.

After Bolshevik supporters organized by Leonid Krasin obtained BCEN-Eurobank in Paris as the first overseas Soviet bank, he, as head of the Centrosoyuz mission, which was formed on 24 February 1920 and was an attempt by the Bolshevik's Council of People's Commissars to break through the trade and political blockade of Bolshevist Russia by Western countries, travelled to London, met with British authorities beginning on 31 May 1920, and established a "Soviet House" or "Russia House" at 49 Moorgate in London, which was known as the All-Russian Cooperative Limited Liability Company "ARCOS" (Russian: ООО Всероссийское Кооперативное Общество, «АРКОС») and supported Bolshevik control of the Moscow Narodny Bank (London), which had formed in October 1919, through Centrosoyuz, as the next Soviet bank located overseas. (Note: From 1920 to 1923, Krasin was the People's Commissar for Foreign Trade from 1920 to 1923, the first plenipotentiary and trade representative in Great Britain from 1920 to 1925, and the first plenipotentiary and trade representative in France from 1924 to 1925.)

The declared authorized capital stock of MNB is £250,000. Original shareholding structure: Moscow Narodny Bank Moscow, Centrosoyuz, Central Association of Flax Growers, Selskosoyuz and Zakupsbyt.

The primary goal of the bank was financing of international trade of the Russian cooperative organizations with Britain and other countries. MNB became the first cooperative bank created as an international trade-support facility.

== Interwar period ==
In 1923, the bank set up a subsidiary Genossenschaftliche Transit Bank (Cooperative Transit Bank) in Riga, Latvia.

During 1924 the bank balance increased 2.5 fold and by the end of the year amounted to £2.4 million, and the bank’s capital stock increased to £500,000. In 1925 the capital stock doubled to £1 million. Such growth allowed MNB to open its branches in Paris in 1925 and in Berlin in 1928. In 1926, the bank agency was established in New York.

On 29 May 1923, Russia House or Soviet House, also known as the All-Russian Cooperative Limited Liability Company "ARCOS" (Russian: ООО Всероссийское Кооперативное Общество, «АРКОС»), established its own Russian Trade Bank known as the ARCOS Bank which operated until the ARCOS affair in May 1927. In 1932 MNB took over the Russian Trade Bank established in London in 1923.

Resolution of the minutes of the meeting of the board of directors of MNB of March 1933: “the bank buys 1000 shares of the Dalbank Harbin bank for 50 thousand dollars in silver”. In 1933 the bank took over the Shanghai branch of Dalbank.

The Paris branch of the bank was closed in 1934, and the branch in Berlin in 1935.

== World War II and postwar development ==
The bank worked during the World War II, with its staff gradually depleted. There were times when the number of people working there was down to four. Communications with many of the bank’s correspondents and clients were disrupted. As a result, the bank became little more than a payment agent for Gosbank. The balance sheet total during those years remained constant at £1 million.

By the end of 1948 the capital of the bank increased to £15.5 million (1945 – £1.5 million).

In May 1950 the Shanghai branch of MNB was closed.

In 1952 the balance reduced to £6 million.

In 1956, after the Hungarian revolt, as the Soviet Union feared that its deposits in North American banks would be frozen in retaliation, it decided to move some of its holdings to the London branch of Moscow Narodny Bank. The British bank would then deposit that money in the U.S. banks. There would be no chance of confiscating that money because it belonged to the British bank and not directly to the Soviets. On 28 February 1957, a sum of $800,000 was transferred. The Soviets also owned a bank in Paris, called the Banque Commercial pour l'Europe du Nord (BCEN). The Paris Russian bank took some Narodny's dollars and lent them. Initially dubbed "Eurobank dollars" after BCEN's telex address, they eventually became known as eurodollars.

In 1959, the former head of the Shanghai branch Andrey Dubonosov was appointed to a managerial position in the London branch of the bank and led Mosnarbank until 1967. During the period from 1958 till 1960 the number of staff members increased from 40 to almost 100.

According to Tomas Aligebov, the Foreign Trade Bank of the USSR had correspondent accounts with Chase Manhattan Bank prior to 1959 but by 1964 to 1966 had become an international bank using currency swaps and transferred its dollars to correspondent accounts with the West German and Italian bank Airobank (Russian: «Эйробанк»), Mosnarbank (Russian: «Моснарбанк»), Deutschebank, the Italian banks Banco Commerciale Italiano and Credita Italiana, BNL, and the Australian based English-Scotch-Australian Bank

From 1963 until 1972, Viktor Gerashchenko was at the MNB. He stated that the Central Bank of England was very strong and prevented MNB from obtaining loans from Moscow to supporting local companies associated with the local Communist Party or KGB, however, MNB and, to a lesser extent, the Paris-based Eurobank secured access to international and European markets to support various Socialist banks and the MNB conducted export and import settlements of the Soviet Union with Europe and loans to many small companies. He also said that both Gosbank and the department of planning and financial bodies of the Central Committee of the CPSU supervised MNB. He said that MNB owned residences for its employees at Highgate West Hill, not far from the Soviet trade mission at 32-33, Highgate West Hill, London N6 6NL, UK, which Leonid Krasin obtained after ending the trade embargo against Bolshevik Russia on 16 January 1920, and the grave of Karl Marx.

From 1960 till 1969 assets have grown from £55.6 million to £331.9 million, and the paid-in capital have grown fourfold during this period and amounted to £5 million. There are a number of reasons for the surge in MNB’s activity in the 1960s. For one thing, it reflected a general upturn in the Soviet Union’s foreign economic relations: the volume of foreign trade in 1960, at over 10 billion rubles, was more than eight times higher than in 1946. Another factor was the re-organization in 1961 of the Foreign Trade Bank of the USSR — the second largest shareholder in MNB after Gosbank.

In 1963, MNB worked with Americans to obtain a very large grain purchase.

In 1963, the Beirut branch of the bank was opened. From 1969 to 1975, Tomas Alibegov was the deputy manager and then the branch manager Mosnarbank (Beirut) under Viktor Gerashchenko who was at this bank until 1971 when he was transferred to Moscow. According to Alibegov, the Beirut branch was second in size in Lebanon only to Arabbank and conducted loans among Czechoslovakia, Yugoslavia, East Germany, Libya, France, Lebanon, Egypt, North Yemen, Turkey, and Jordan. In 1973, the branch moved into a building next to the Bank of Lebanon and was sold to Saudi Arabia after the branch in Beirut closed and moved to Cyprus and became the Russian Commercial Bank RCB Bank.

In September 1964, The Guardian named Andrey Dubonosov one of the most popular men in the City of London.

In 1965, the bank declared the possibility of exchanging transferable rubles for gold and freely convertible currencies.

On 7 November 1966, Dubonosov had a heart attack and in April 1967, Nikolai Vasilievich Nikitkin replaced Dubonosov as chairman of the board, but he was nominal and Dix, who ran operations, controlled the bank.

On 22 November 1971, the branch in Singapore opened. From the end of 1971 till the end of 1973 the bank’s assets have grown from £391.8 to £835.9 million.

In 1972, MNB worked with Americans to obtain a very large grain purchase.

In 1973 they began investing in the London Stock Exchange through City stockbroker Fiske & Co, today Fiske PLC.

In 1975, the Moscow representative office started its operations.

By 1977, the bank has been among 300 top banks in the world with assets of over $1 billion.

In 1980s, the bank placed a strong focus on foreign exchange dealings, and in particular on attracting funds from Western Europe's banks to sustain its credit resources. The borrowings enabled it to support existing operations and provide the Foreign Trade Bank of the USSR with new loans as required. In the early 1980s this work was severely disrupted by escalating political and economic tensions. The anti-Soviet campaign that unfolded in the USA, Britain and other Western countries, combined with difficulties experienced by some socialist countries in keeping up their external payments, led to a situation whereby many Western banks refused to enter into credit, deposit and in some cases even foreign exchange arrangements with Soviet banks, including Moscow Narodny. Faced with these circumstances, MNB London practically stopped granting any new credits for operations not connected with Soviet foreign trade, and gradually reduced the bank’s loan portfolio as existing loans were repaid. No new medium-term loans were granted, either, with activities limited to short-term trade finance operations. Over the period from 1 July 1981 to 1 May 1982, the amount of credits with terms of 1 year or above on MNB’s balance sheet shrank from 794.4 million to 713.2 million rubles. At the same time, work on maintaining the bank’s supply of credit resources was stepped up.

In 1985 it was decided to close the Beirut branch.

In August 1986, after the redemption of imperial bonds issued before 1917, MNB played a key role in provision of an opportunity for the Soviet Union to get direct international loans again.

MNB had long worked with Morgan Grenfell & Company.

== Post-Soviet period ==
In 1991 the Central Bank of Russia became the owner of the control stock of MNB.

Support on the part of MNB allowed Helen Sharman to become the first British cosmonaut in May 1991.

In 1995 MNB opened its representative office in Canada.

In 1997 MNB created a subsidiary CB Mosnarbank CJSC in Moscow, which later on merged with OJSC JCSB Evrofinance and formed Evrofinance Mosnarbank.

In 1999 a new representative office was opened in Beijing.

In December 2005 VTB acquires Moscow Narodny Bank Limited. (Note: VTB has the western subsidiaries of the Central Bank of Russia and, before the dissolution of the Soviet Union, the daughters of the Soviet Union's Gosbank which were the 1921 established and Leonid Krasin associated Banque commerciale pour l'Europe du Nord or BCEN-Eurobank in Paris, Moscow Narodny Bank in London, the 1971 established Ost-West Handelsbank (OWH) in Frankfurt, the 1974 established Donau Bank in Vienna, and East-West United Bank in Luxembourg. In order to financially assist Communist Parties, anti-imperialism, and pro national liberation movements worldwide, these banks acted as subsidiaries or daughters to their "mother" Gosbank, which was the central bank of Russian Soviet Federative Socialist Republic (Russia) from 1921 to 1922 and the Soviet Union from 1923 to 1991. These banks only support the Kremlin's objectives.)

== Directors and General Managers ==
- Jean (Ivan) V. Bubnov (10.1919–06.1920)
- F. I. Shmelyov (06.1920–10.1924)
- Nikolai V. Gavrilov (10.1924–09.1925)
- F. I. Shmelyov (09.1925–08.1927)
- M. V. Zemblyukhter (08.1927–12.1931)
- Alexander I. Shvetsov (12.1931–12.1932)
- Emanuel Kviring (12.1932–09.1934)
- Michael Wuhl (09.1934–1937)
- Ivan M. Andreyev (03.1940–05.1947)
- A. A. Oleinik (05.1947–06.1950)
- Alexei A. Kuznetsov (06.1950–05.1953)
- Alexei A. Chernozub (05.1953–05.1959)
- Andrey I. Dubonosov (05.1959–04.1967)
- Nikolai V. Nikitkin (04.1967–09.1972)
- Sergei A. Shevchenko (09.1972–12.1976)
- Oleg N. Kulikov (12.1976–12.1982)
- Dmitry Ya. Penzin (12.1982–03.1987)
- Alexander S. Maslov (03.1987–07.1991)
- Alexander P. Semikoz (08.1991–07.1997)
- Yury V. Poletayev (01.1997–07.1997)
- Igor G. Suvorov (07.1997–12.2005)
- Yury V. Ponomaryov (03.1998–09.1999)

== MNB family tree ==
1911; Moscow Narodny Bank (Moscow)
1915; Moscow Narodny Bank (London)
1919; Moscow Narodny Bank Limited
1995; Mosnarbank (Moscow)	1993; Evrofinance (Moscow)
2003; Evrofinance Mosnarbank (Moscow)	2005; VTB Capital UK

== See also ==
- Banking in the Soviet Union
