= Eurodollar =

U.S. dollars held in banks outside the U.S.

Eurodollars is a financial term used to describe certain U.S. dollar-denominated deposit liabilities (primarily but not exclusively time deposits) held at banks or their branches outside the United States.

The name existed before the creation of the euro currency of the European Union and has no connection with it. The term originated with U.S. dollar deposits held in European banks.

The term has expanded to include U.S. dollar-denominated deposits held at banks anywhere outside the United States. A deposit in a financial centre such as Dubai or Singapore, for example, is likewise considered a Eurodollar, though deposits held in certain Asian financial centres are also sometimes called Asiadollars. More generally, the euro- prefix can be used to indicate any currency held in a country where it is not the official currency, broadly termed "eurocurrency", for example, Euroyen or even Euroeuro.

They are financially important because they are outside the control of the US government. Eurodollars have different regulatory requirements than dollars held in U.S. banks. Eurodollars can be riskier than assets held in U.S. banks, which include at least partial deposit insurance, and as a result, demand a higher interest rate.

Eurodollar loans facilitate global trade and investment and liquidity. The eurodollar futures market was a major interest rate market until the Libor scandal. By 2023, most volume had moved to SOFR futures.

== History ==
After World War II, the quantity of physical U.S. dollar banknotes outside the United States increased significantly, as a result of both the dollar funding of the Marshall Plan and from dollar proceeds of European exports to the U.S., which had become the largest consumer market.

As a result, large amounts of U.S. dollar banknotes were in the custody of foreign banks outside the United States. Some foreign countries, including the Soviet Union, also had deposits in U.S. dollars in American banks, evidenced by certificates of deposit. Various narrations are given of the creation of the first eurodollar account, but most trace back to Communist governments keeping dollar deposits abroad.

In one version, the first eurodollar account was created in France in favour of Communist China, which in 1949 managed to move almost all of its U.S. dollar banknotes to the Soviet-owned Banque Commerciale pour l'Europe du Nord – Eurobank (BCEN) in Paris before the United States froze its remaining U.S. situated assets during the Korean War. The "eurodollar" name comes from BCEN's telex address, "Eurobank". (Note: Or "Eurbank" according to George Goodman.)

In another version, the first eurodollar account was created by an English bank in favour of the Soviet Union during the Cold War, following the Hungarian Revolution of 1956, as the Soviet Union feared that its deposits in North American banks would be frozen as a sanction. It therefore decided to move some of its U.S. dollars held directly in North American banks to the Moscow Narodny Bank, an English limited liability company registered in London in 1919, whose shares were owned by the Soviet Union. The English bank would then re-deposit the dollars into U.S. banks. Thus although in reality the dollars never left North America, there would be no chance of the U.S. confiscating that money, because now it belonged legally to the British bank and not directly to the Soviets, the beneficial owners. Accordingly, on 28 February 1957, the sum of $800,000 was duly transferred, creating the first eurodollars. Initially dubbed "Eurobank dollars" after BCEN's telex address, they eventually became known as "eurodollars". City of London banks, such as Midland Bank, now part of HSBC, and their offshore holding companies also played a major role in holding the deposits.

In the mid-1950s, Eurodollar trading and its development into a dominant world currency began when the Soviet Union wanted better interest rates on their Eurodollars and convinced an Italian banking cartel to give them more interest than could have been earned if the dollars were deposited in the U.S. The Italian bankers then had to find customers ready to borrow the Soviet dollars and pay above the U.S. legal interest-rate caps for their use, and were able to do so; thus, Eurodollars began to be used increasingly in global finance.

By the end of the 1960s, the eurodollar market was $70 billion.

These deposits were lent on as U.S. dollar loans to businesses in other countries where interest rates on loans were perhaps much higher in the local currency, and where the businesses were exporting to the U.S. and receiving payment in dollars, thereby avoiding foreign exchange risk on their funding arrangements.

In 1974, after the Nixon shock, the 1970s energy crisis, and the collapse of Franklin National Bank, 10 central banks worldwide agreed to backstop the eurodollar market to prevent a run.

By the mid-1980s, there were more eurodollars than dollars.

Several factors led eurodollars to overtake certificates of deposit (CDs) issued by U.S. banks as the primary private short-term money market instruments by the 1980s, including:

- The successive balance of payments deficits of the United States, causing a net outflow of dollars;
- Regulation Q, the U.S. Federal Reserve's ceiling on interest payable on domestic deposits during the high inflation of the 1970s
- Eurodollar deposits were a cheaper source of funds because they were free of reserve requirements and deposit insurance assessments

In 1997, nearly 90% of all international loans were made via Eurodollars.

Until the repeal of Regulation Q on 21 July 2011, banks were not allowed to pay interest on corporate transactional accounts. Banks would automatically transfer, or sweep, funds from a corporation's checking account into an overnight investment option such as Eurodollar sweep accounts to effectively earn interest on those funds.

In 2016, the Eurodollar market size was estimated at around 13.833 trillion.

From 2016 to 2024, the use of Eurodollars has consistently declined.

After reserve requirements were eliminated in 2020, U.S. banks began shifting toward selected deposits (domestic, offshore-style instruments) instead of Eurodollars. As of early 2024, selected deposits made up nearly 85% of overnight volume, compared to about 50–50 in 2019.

== Eurodollar futures contracts ==
The Eurodollar futures contract was launched in 1981. It was the first cash-settled futures contract. It traded on the Chicago Mercantile Exchange. Eurodollar futures were an instrument used to wager on Federal Reserve policy or to hedge the direction of short-term interest rates. In April 2023, after the Libor scandal, they were eliminated and transitioned to SOFR-based contracts.

== See also ==
- Banking in the United States
- Eurobond
- Petrocurrency
- Swap
- TED spread
