= Yury Ponomaryov (banker) =

Russian banker

Chairman of Moscow Narodny Bank
- In office 1998–1999

President and chairman of Vneshtorgbank
- In office 1999–2002

Personal details
- Born: December 15, 1946 (age 79) Moscow, Soviet Union
- Children: 4
- Education: Moscow Financial Institute
- Occupation: Banker

Yury Valentinovich Ponomaryov (also Iouri Valentinovitch Ponomarev; in Russian: Юрий Валентинович Пономарёв) is a Russian banker, chairman of the board of directors of Moscow Narodny Bank (1998–1999) and president and chairman of Vneshtorgbank (1999–2002).

== Education ==
In 1970, he graduated from the International Economic Relations Faculty of the Moscow Financial Institute.

== Career ==
Since 1969, as a student trainee, Ponomaryov was enlisted into the Foreign Exchange and Cash Management Department of the Foreign Trade Bank of the USSR. He served there in various positions: as an operator of international exchange operations, manager of the Department of international exchange operations, deputy general manager. In 1973, he became head of the Foreign exchange operations department of the Foreign Trade Bank.

In 1980, Yury Ponomaryov was appointed deputy chairman of the board and general manager of the Moscow Narodny Bank (MNB) in London. In 1984, he returned to Moscow to become the head of the Foreign Exchange Department of the Foreign Trade Bank of the USSR.

In 1986, Ponomaryov became a member of the board, head of the Main Monetary and Economic Department of the USSR State Bank. While in this office, he became among the creators of documents on the establishment of the first commercial banks in the USSR. In September 1988, The international Institutional Investor magazine called Yury Ponomaryov “The Banker of the Year 1988”.

In 1989, Ponomaryov left for Paris as CEO, chairman of the board of directors of the Banque Commerciale pour l'Europe du Nord – Eurobank.

During the 1990s, he was involved in FIMACO.

At the beginning of 1992 he was called to the then head of the Central Bank of Russia Georgy Matyukhin's office and offered to deal with the situation in Vnesheconombank of the USSR, which had been in crisis at that moment. In February 1992, Yu. V. Ponomarev was appointed chairman of the committee for operational management of Vnesheconombank. In May of that year, having fulfilled his mission (on a voluntary basis: all this time Yu. V. Ponomarev was listed as the head of a Paris bank), as soon as Vnesheconombank overcame the acute stage of the crisis, he returned to his duties at the Eurobank.

In May 1993, it was planned in Kremlin, that the chairman of the Central Bank of Russia Viktor Gerashchenko would be "dismissed of his own will". Ponomaryov had been among the candidates for this office. He met with Boris Yeltsin, but, showing no burning desire to become the Russia's main banker, he returned to Paris. In April 1996 he was reappointed as chairman of the board of directors of Eurobank.

From 1998 to 1999 he served as chairman of the board of the Moscow Narodny Bank in London. While in this office, he led a project of the Bank of Russia, according to which three Russian foreign banks – Eurobank (Paris), Moscow Narodny Bank (London) and Ost-West Handelsbank (Frankfurt) – were merged into a banking group with consolidated management.

In 1999, he again returned to Moscow as president and chairman of the board of Vneshtorgbank. He led supervisory boards of Russian banks abroad: in Paris, Zurich, Vienna, Luxembourg and Cyprus.

In September 2002, Ponomaryov became a co-chairman of the board of directors, managing director of the Russian-owned East-West United Bank (EWUB) in Luxembourg, where he worked in charge of accounting until 1 June 2005. Sergey Valentinovich Pavlov (Russian: Сергей Валентинович Павлов; born 21 January 1960) was a co-chairman at EWUB and was in charge of lending at EWUB. Beginning in 1990, Sergey Pavlov was an intern at EWUB.

Since 2010 he has been chairman of the Energotransbank in Kaliningrad, Russia.

== Family ==
Married with four children.
