= East-West United Bank =

Bank in Luxembourg

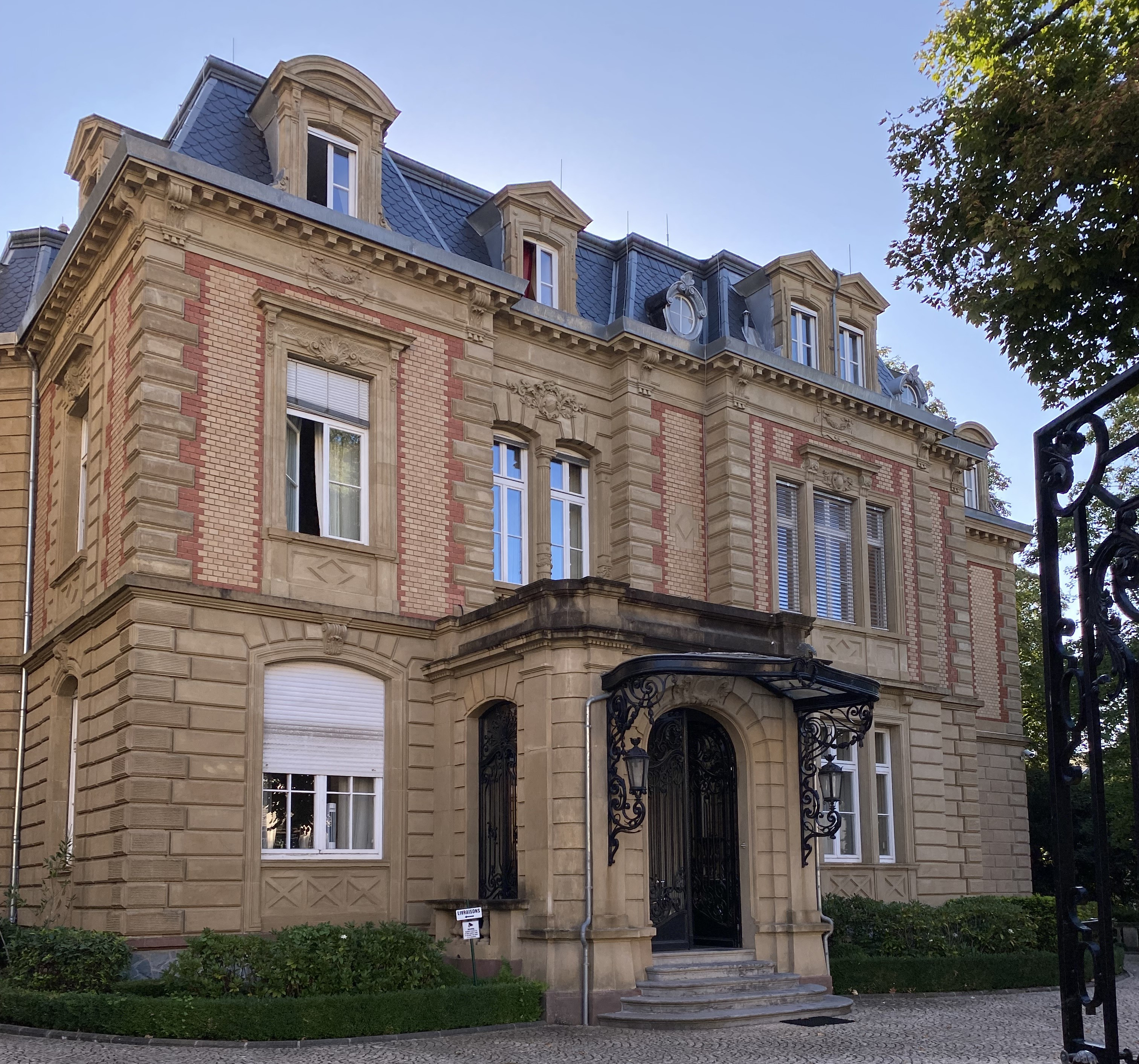
- Villa Foch in Luxembourg City, head office of East-West United Bank since 1977
- Type: Subsidiary
- Industry: Financial services
- Founded: June 12, 1974; 52 years ago
- Defunct: February 28, 2024
- Fate: liquidation
- Headquarters: Luxemburg
- Services: Private banking; Corporate finance
- Total assets: €724 (2021)

East-West United Bank (French: Banque Unie Est-Ouest) is a bank based in Luxembourg, established in June 1974 by the Gosbank, the Soviet Union's central bank. It has been fully owned by Russia-based Sistema since 2018. The bank offered private banking and corporate financing, with €724 million in total assets as of 2021. Since the Russian invasion of Ukraine in February 2022, the bank faced difficulties. Due to international sanctions and other issues, Sistema made the decision to sell the bank in late 2023. The bank eventually ceased operations due to collapsed assets,

== History ==
The East-West United Bank was founded on 12 June 1974 by the Gosbank and Vneshtorgbank, with the support of Luxembourg Prime Minister Pierre Werner. (Note: In additional to Gosbank and Vneshtorgbank, other shareholders included the Sovzagranbanks: Moscow Narodny Bank, Banque Commerciale pour l'Europe du Nord – Eurobank, Wozchod Handels Bank of Zurich, Ost-West Handelsbank, and the Russo-Iranian Bank (RIB) also known as Rusiranbank (Russian: Русиранбанк)) The shareholding structure associating Gosbank and VTB lasted until 1992.

From 1992 to 2000, Imperial Bank had a major stake in EWUB of 49% and Tokobank, (Note: The Interindustry Commercial Bank for the Development of Wholesale Trade which is also transliterated as Intersectoral Commercial Bank for the Development of Wholesale Trade (Russian: Межотраслевой коммерческий банк развития оптовой торговли) or TOKOBANK (Russian: ТОКОБАНК) was founded in 1989 by the all-powerful State Supply of the USSR (Gossnab) with its territorial branches, the State Insurance of the USSR (Gosstrakh), the Administration of the Affairs of the Central Committee of the Komsomol, the Ministry of Marine of the USSR (Minmorflot), MGA of the USSR, Ministry of Montazhspetsstroy of the USSR, Agrobank of the USSR, the 1987 established Sberbank of the USSR, commercial banks, many large enterprises and cooperatives (Russian: Госснаб СССР с его территориальными отделениями, Госстрах СССР, Управление делами ЦК ВЛКСМ, Минморфлот СССР, МГА СССР, Минмонтажспецстрой СССР, Агробанк СССР, Сбербанк СССР, коммерческие банки, множество крупных предприятий и кооперативов.) In 1995, TOKOBANK was headed by Viktor Yakunin (Russian: Виктор Якунин).) which collapsed after the 1998 Russian financial crisis began on 17 August 1998, held a 28% stake in EWUB in 1998, but, on 17 April 2000, Imperial Bank was dissolved. Imperial Bank focused on oil and natural gas supplies to East Germany and later to Germany including the oil-for-pipes program. (Note: With Vnesheconombank managing Soviet debt, Imperial Bank speculated in GKOs but collapsed with the demise of the GKO market following the 1998 financial collapse in Russia.)

When VTB had a major stake in EWUB from 2000 to 2007, EWUB was one of the five foreign banks of Russia's VTB banking network. (Note: VTB has the western subsidiaries of the Central Bank of Russia and, before the dissolution of the Soviet Union, the daughters of the Soviet Union's Gosbank which were the 1921 established and Leonid Krasin associated Banque commerciale pour l'Europe du Nord or BCEN-Eurobank in Paris, Moscow Narodny Bank in London, the 1971 established Ost-West Handelsbank (OWH) in Frankfurt, the 1974 established Donau Bank in Vienna, and East-West United Bank in Luxembourg. In order to financially assist Communist Parties, anti-imperialism, and pro national liberation movements worldwide, these banks acted as subsidiaries or daughters to their "mother" Gosbank, which was the central bank of Russian Soviet Federative Socialist Republic (Russia) from 1921-1922 and the Soviet Union from 1923-1991. These banks only support the Kremlin's objectives.)

Beginning in 2001, the Vladimir Yevtushenkov led Sistema gained a stake in EWUB. Through Sistema's subsidiary Moscow Bank for Reconstruction and Development (MDRB) (Russian: Московский банк реконструкции и развития «МБРР»), which was established in 1993 with Sistema as a shareholder since 1994, Sistema controlled a 49% stake in East-West United Bank (EWUB) in February 2005 and, since 2007 Sistema has had the majority stake in EWUB.

In 2018, Sistema became 100% owner of EWUB with Sergei Pchelintsev (Russian: Сергей Алексеевич Пчелинцев) as the CEO.

According to a declaration given on 18 October 2018 in Spanish court by Sergey Dozhdev (Russian: Сергей Дождев), Igor Sechin uses his offshore companies to control Sistema through MTS and Bashneft. (Note: Sergey Dozhdev (Russian: Сергей Дождев) stated "The real Russian mafia is those who rule the world. In particular, it includes Igor Sechin, a man who took over Sistema through Bashneft and MTS using his offshore companies. The Rotenberg brothers, who control the Platon Company, are in the mafia too. 75 percent of Platon belongs to offshore companies, which the Rotenbergs use to siphon off money to Europe. Arnold Tamm used to co-own Sistema. However, he had a disagreement with the Rotenberg brothers, and Herman Gref ceased the refinancing of loans through his son Arkady. The company incurred artificial liabilities, and Sechin bought it at a low price through offshore companies.")

In 2020, EWUB had €677 million in assets. On 27 June 2020, Etienne Schneider became an independent director of Sistema and his close political friend Jeannot Krecké was a director at Sistema beginning in May 2012. In March 2022, Krecké at Sistema and Schneider at EWUB resigned from their positions on their respective boards after public pressure resulting from the 2022 Russian invasion of Ukraine.

The Luxembourg bank was put up for sale once Sistema made the decision in October 2022, considered solvent with 10.7 billion rubles of assets and 4.8 billion rubles of liabilities. Bank assets were sold through 2023 creating liquidity however by the end of the year, it was decided to close the bank, with professional parties being given an exemption from sanctions to undertake a swift close down.

=== Sanctions ===
Following the February and March 2022 sanctions issued against VTB and its subsidiaries which include the former daughter banks of the Soviet Union's State Bank Gosbank and later the Central Bank of Russia, EWUB in Luxembourg has become the principal Russian overseas bank in Europe after Gazprombank's liquidation. As of early April 2022, Yevtushenkov, Sistema, and its subsidiary East-West United Bank (EWUB) in Luxembourg have not been sanctioned due to Russian interference in Ukraine, even though some of the bank's directors resigned in early March 2022. As of 2022, Russian billionaires were known to be beneficiaries of the bank.

In November 2023, the bank was sanctioned by the U.S. Department of the Treasury’s Office of Foreign Assets Control (OFAC) under E.O. 14024 for being owned or controlled by, or having acted or purported to act for or on behalf of, directly or indirectly, Sistema. Authority was given by the US Department of Treasury to undertake bank wind down procedures until 31 January 2024, provided any funds recovered are placed in a blocked account.

In February 2024, the Luxembourg District Court ruled for the dissolution and winding up of EWUB, ordering a liquidation of assets and activating an investor compensation scheme.

== Head office ==
The EWUB is headquartered at Villa Foch, a historic property on 10, Boulevard Joseph II in Luxembourg. The villa was erected in 1891 for Alsatian businessman Jean-Henri Thierry and his wife Catherine Rückert on a design by architect Charles Mullendorff. In the final stages of World War I, it was used by Supreme Allied Commander Ferdinand Foch for his headquarters, from which it retains its name. The EWUB acquired it in 1976 and moved in the next year after renovation. It was renovated again in 2010-2012. The EWUB also maintains an office in a nearby building at 26, avenue Monterey.

== Leadership ==
- Vladimir Malinin, Director 1977-1984 (Note: Vladimir Georgievich Malinin (Russian: Владимир Георгиевич Малинин; 29 June 1940 Moscow, Soviet Union - 4 February 2021 Vienna, Austria) graduated from the Financial University in 1963 with a degree in economics. From 1964 to 1968, he was at Vneshtorgbank of the USSR as an inspector, senior economist, senior consultant, head of the foreign exchange and cash operations department, and from 1968 to 1969 he was the Deputy Chief Accountant. From 1969 to 1970, he was at Moscow Narodny Bank in London and then transferred to its Beirut branch and from 1970 to 1971, he was the chief accountant under Viktor Gerashchenko and from 1971 to 1974, the deputy general manager under Tomas Alibegov. After EWUB, Malinin returned to Vneshtorgbank of the USSR and from 1984 to 1985 was the head of the foreign bank loans department then in 1985 was the head of the department for monitoring the operational activities of overseas Soviet banks until February 1988 when he became the Deputy Chairman of the Board of the Vnesheconombank of the USSR until December 1990. He moved to Vienna and from December 1990 to April 1996, he was Chairman of the Board of Donau Bank. In 2012, he became an independent director at Vozrozhdenie Bank and served on its board of directors until his death in 2021.)
- Sergey Valentinovich Pavlov (Russian: Сергей Валентинович Павлов; born 21 January 1960), CEO 1990-2013 and the son of Valentin Pavlov (Note: In September 2002, Yury Ponomaryov became a co-chairman of the board of directors, managing director of the Russian-owned East-West United bank (EWUB) in Luxembourg, where he worked in charge of accounting until 1 June 2005. Sergey Valentinovich Pavlov was a co-chairman at EWUB and was in charge of lending at EWUB. Beginning in 1990, Sergey Pavlov was an intern at EWUB.)
- Svetlana Fedotova (Russian: Светлана Федотова; born 1972 or 1973), CEO April 2013-September 2015
- Sergey Alexeevich Pchelintsev (Russian: Сергей Алексеевич Пчелинцев), CEO 2015-2021

== See also ==
- Banking in the Soviet Union
- List of banks in Luxembourg
