= Evrofinance Mosnarbank =

Russian commercial bank

OJSC Evrofinance Mosnarbank
- Company type: Open Joint Stock Company
- Industry: Banking
- Headquarters: Moscow, Russia
- Key people: Sergey N. Yarosh (President – Chairman of the Executive Board)
- Products: Financial services
- Net income: ▼RUB 203 million (2019)
- Total assets: ▼RUB 64.4 billion (2019)
- Rating: B1 (Moody's), B+ (Fitch) (2017)
- Website: www.evrofinance.ru

OJSC Evrofinance Mosnarbank is a Russian commercial bank. Full name of the Bank: Open Joint-Stock Company Evrofinance Mosnarbank. Head office locates in Moscow. General License No. 2402 of Bank of Russia.

== Company ==
- 50% minus 2 shares - FONDEN, S.A.
- 50% plus 2 shares - Rosimushchestvo (shares received from the former owners VTB and Gazprombank for free after the imposition of US sanctions in 2019).

In the fall of 2020, bank began to attract dollar deposits at a rate four times higher than the market average (2% per annum). Due to sanctions, deposits are only accepted in cash.

== Controversy ==
=== Sanctions ===
In March 2019, the United States Treasury Department sanctioned Evrofinance Monsarbank over its relationship with Venezuelan state oil company PDVSA.

On March 13, 2019, Evrofinance Mosnarbank promised that in the near future, bank customers will receive cards of the Mir payment system instead of the Visa and MasterCard payment systems that disabled the bank. The National Payment Card System (NSPK) notes that card transactions can be resumed as soon as the bank solves problems with processing.
