= Ost-West Handelsbank =

Soviet-controlled bank in Frankfurt

Ost-West Handelsbank AG (OWH) was a Soviet-controlled bank in Frankfurt established in 1971. It was acquired by VTB Bank and changed its name to VTB Bank Deutschland on 30 September 2006.

== History ==
Ost-West Handelsbank AG (OWHB) was founded in 1971 by the Soviet Union's Gosbank, VEB of the USSR and a number of allied trade associations with Andrey Dubonosov as chairman of the board. (Note: Andrey Ilyich Dubonosov (Russian: Андрей Ильич Дубоносов; 1900 – 1978) was a roofer's apprentice when he volunteered for the Red Army in 1918 and in 1921 he became a Chekist with the Special Department in the Moscow Region (Lubyanka, 14) and took finance courses after which he transferred to Gosbank and took evening courses at the Industrial and Economic Institute (Russian: промышленно-экономический институт). After graduating, he became the director of the Dalbank (Russian: Дальбанк) in Harbin in 1930. After the Japanese occupied Manchuria and established the puppet state Manchukuo, he sold the Soviet's road to Japan for 140 million yen. He went to Shanghai as a Chekist and often met Richard Sorge giving Sorge packages and money before Sorge left for Moscow on 12 November 1932 and he also met with the Chekist resident "Paul" K. M. Rimm (Russian: К. М. Римм 1891-1937) until his departure from Shanghai in August 1933. In May 1933, he headed the Shanghai branch of Russian-Asian Bank (Russian: Русско-Азиатский банк) in the Bund but was not allowed to finance commodities between the USSR and southern China which was financed by the Vladivostok office of Gosbank and sometimes by Dalbank DVK. In 1939, he went to London as Chekist and worked at the Black Sea and Baltic Insurance Company (Blackbaltsea) (Russian: «Блэкбалтси») insuring British shipping to Russia under Lend-Lease until the end of the war in 1945. Then he worked at the Main Directorate of Soviet Property Abroad (GUSIMZ) (Russian: Главное управление советского имущества за рубежом (ГУСИМЗ)). From 1959 to 1967, he led Moscow Narodny Bank in London and was one of the founding fathers of the Eurodollar market. In 1959-1960 and again in 1966–1967, he tried to get West German authorities to allow him to establish a Soviet State bank at Frankfurt am Main but did not receive support from the government of West Germany until the early 1970s. His son Leonid Dubonosov (Russian: Леонид Дубоносов) was a KGB illegal that wrote the book Illegal Abroad («Нелегал за океаном» «Консалтбанкир», 2003, ISBN 5851871032).)

Ost-West Handelsbank supported trading between West Germany and the West with the Soviet Union and its friendly socialist states including East Germany, and, after the reunification of Germany, it continued supporting trade between Germany and the CIS states. From 1973 to 1991, OWHB facilitated trade between East Germany and West Germany through its stand at the annual spring and autumn festivals in Leipzig.

In 1974, OWHB gained stakes in Moscow People's Bank (London) and Wozkhod Handelsbank (Zurich) and Viktor Gerashchenko became the second chairman of the board replacing Dubonosov.

On 9 May 1976, Igor Semyonovich Gorbatsevich (Russian: Игорь Семёнович Горбацевич) from Vneshtorgbank became chairman of the board of OWHB and Gerashchenko transferred to the Singapore branch of Moscow Narodny Bank.

In 1983, OWHB opened its Moscow branch at Kamergersky Lane, 6.

From July to December 1985, Anatoly Tsemyansky replaced Gorbatsevich, who retired, and in February 1986 Valery Lyulchev became chairman of the board until November 1989 when Sergei Bochkarev replaced him. (Note: Anatoly Yakovlevich Tsemyansky (Russian: Анатолий Яковлевич Цемянский; 26 December 1944 – December 1985) graduated from the Financial University in Moscow in 1968 with a degree in International Economic Relations and completed his postgraduate studies there in 1971. He was deputy chairman of the board of the Ost-West Handelsbank (OWHB) from April 1978 to December 1981 and chairman of the board of OWHB from July to December 1985.) (Note: Valery Vasilyevich Lyulchev (Russian: Валерий Васильевич Люльчев; 1 March 1939 Moscow, Soviet Union)) Bochkaryov was chairman of the board of OWHB from 1989 to 1993. (Note: Sergei Mikhailovich Bochkarev (Russian: Сергей Михайлович Бочкарёв; 30 April 1949 – 10 December 2010) graduated from the Financial University in Moscow and taught there from 1977 to 1980, then was deputy head of the Import Settlement Department (Import Department) and later the Foreign Bank Credits Department of Vneshtorgbank of the USSR. From 1980 to 1985, he was commissioner general of Ost-West Handelsbank (OWHB), then was posted as deputy head of the department of Soviet Banking Institutions Abroad during 1985, then was secretary of the party committee of Vnestorgbank of the USSR from 1985 to 1987, then instructed in the Economic Department of the Apparatus of the Central Committee of the CPSU from 1987 to 1988, and was chairman of the board of OWHB from 1989 to 1993. He was on the boards of several financial institutions including the Sergey S. Rodionov associated Imperial Bank and Vanguard. From 2005 until his death in December 2010, Bochkaryov was with the bank Retail Lending Company (Russian: банка «Компания Розничного Кредитования») (KRK) and was chairman of the board of the bank in 2010.)

By 1990, it was the third largest of the daughters of the State Bank of USSR behind the much larger Moscow Narodny Bank in London and Banque Commerciale pour l'Europe du Nord – Eurobank in Paris.

At the end of 1991, Ost-West Handelsbank had a DM 65 million paid-in share of capital.

In the early 1990s, Sergei Nikolaevich Dergachyov (Russian: Сергей Николаевич Дергачёв) (Note: Sergei Nikolaevich Dergachyov also spelled Dergachev (Russian: Сергей Николаевич Дергачёв; born 23 January 1955) graduated from the Moscow Institute of Finance with honors in 1977 majoring in International Economic Relations. From 1980 to 1985, he was the Senior, Chief Economist in the Department of International Organizations and Integration Agreements of the Department of Socialist Countries at the Vneshtorgbank of the USSR. Under Yury Ponomaryov from 1985 to 1986, he was Head of the Department of Financial Operations and Economic Analysis of the Currency Department of the USSR Vneshtorgbank, had an internship at the Moscow Narodny Bank in 1986, and was the former deputy head of the Currency Department of Vnesheconombank of the USSR from 1986 to 1988. Using state money, Dergachyov and the brother of Viktor Melnikov, who served as Deputy Chairman of the Central Bank of Russia from 1998 to 2013, created the Rusimpex company (Russian: комания «Русьимпекс») that gained a large stake in Ost-West Handelsbank by purchasing OWHB shares through CJSC Rusimpex (Russian: ЗАО Русьимпекс) while Dergachyov's Turkish firm Telaga company (Russian: комания «Телага») assumed non-performing loans amounting to 40 million Deutsche Marks. From 1990 to 1991, he was Director with General Responsibilities of Ost-West Handelsbank, from 1991 to 1993, was the Deputy Chairman of the Board of Ost-West Handelsbank, and from 1993 to November 2002, was the Chairman of the Board of Ost-West Handelsbank.) became president of Ost-West Handelsbank after the former president and chairman of the board of Ost-West Handelsbank from 1985 to December 1993 Sergei Mikhailovich Bochkarev (Russian: Сергей Михайлович Бочкарев) left for work with the German branch of Inkombank. Dergachyov served as chairman of the board of Ost-West Handelsbank from December 1993 to November 2002.

== See also ==
- Foreign trade of the Soviet Union
- Banking in the Soviet Union
- List of banks in Germany
