= Foreign Trade Bank of the USSR =

Former bank in the USSR

The Foreign Trade Bank of the USSR (Russian: Банк для внешней торговли СССР, abbreviated Внешторгбанк, Latinized Vneshtorgbank) was the monopoly state credit institution for trade finance in the Soviet Union. It was initially established in 1922 as the Russian Commercial Bank (Рускомбанк / Roskombank) and reorganized as Vneshtorgbank in 1924.

In 1988, it was reorganized as the Bank for Foreign Economic Affairs of the USSR (Russian: Банк внешнеэкономической деятельности СССР) or Vnesheconombank. With the dissolution of the Soviet Union, Vnesheconombank's operations in the post-Soviet states became new institutions such as Belvnesheconombank in Belarus, the Bank of Estonia, Alem Bank in Kazakhstan, or Ukreximbank in Ukraine. The Russian Vnesheconombank defaulted in 1992 and, after multiple restructurings, eventually became VEB.RF.

== Roskombank ==
The Russian Commercial Bank was the first foreign-trade bank established in the Russian Soviet Republic and was allowed to carry out all common banking transactions, including transactions in foreign currencies and precious metals. It was created in the autumn of 1922 as part of the New Economic Policy (NEP) under Grigory Sokolnikov, the People's Commissar for Finance, with a capital of 10 million gold rubles (5.1 million dollars). The former head of the Siberian Bank in Petrograd, Tarnovsky, was appointed president, and Swedish banker Olof Aschberg became appointed chairman of the board. The Garantie- und Kreditbank für den Osten, opened by Aschberg in 1920 in Berlin, took over the representation of the Russian Commercial Bank in Germany.

== Vneshtorgbank ==
Following a decision in December 1923, the People's Commissariat of Foreign Trade proposed transforming the Russian Commercial Bank into a special foreign trade bank. Thus Vneshtorgbank was created on 7 April 1924, initially with seven branches in the Union republics. In February 1926, the Gosbank took over extensive foreign business and the Foreign Trade Bank's branch network was consequently reduced. In 1927, negotiations were held with the Berliner Handels-Gesellschaft to secure foreign loans, but in May of that year the Soviet Council of People's Commissars granted Gosbank extensive control over Vneshtorgbank in order to centralise its foreign trade activities, putting an end to its autonomous decision-making.

During World War II, the employees of Vneshtorgbank were transferred to Kuybyshev along with those of the foreign trade department of the Gosbank. In the early 1950s, the bank's last remaining office overseas, that in Istanbul, was closed and the bank's workforce was down to only 58 staff. The following decade saw an improvement in foreign trade relations and the transfer of new powers from the Gosbank to the Vneshtorgbank, in particular the expansion of loans to Soviet foreign trade institutions. With a new statute that enabled the bank to safeguard the state's currency monopoly, the bank began to play an increasingly prominent role in transactions with foreign partners. In the mid-1960s, the focus was on Western European loans for the development of the automotive industry in the Volga region, in cooperation with Italy's Fiat Group. This was followed by the procurement of loans for natural gas against steel pipes, initially in 1968 with Austrian partners and in 1970 with a German banking consortium.

The Vneshtorgbank was the only Soviet financial institution to retain the legal form of a joint-stock company, its shareholders being a number of Soviet foreign-trade monopoly companies as well as the Gosbank. In addition to foreign trade, it was also involved in the exchange of money from foreign tourists in the USSR, and was the administrator of foreign currency balances for domestic companies and institutions. Its role as a gold seller on the Western markets was significant, allowing the USSR to obtain foreign currency with which to pay for imports.

== Vnesheconombank ==
On 1 January 1988, the Soviet Vneshtorgbank was reorganized as Vnesheconombank. In October 1989, the Soviet authorities sponsored a new entity, International Moscow Bank (IMB), capitalized with Vnesheconombank's hard currency reserves, with the aim that IMB may eventually replace the troubled Vnesheconombank.

In 1991, Vnesheconombank's assets were seized by the Soviet authorities, and in 1992 it defaulted on loans that it had received from foreign commercial banks, which were subsequently the matter of London Club negotiations. Vnesheconombank again partly defaulted in late 1998.

Vnesheconombank was reorganized in 2007 as a Russian state development bank, and eventually rebranded in 2018 as VEB.RF.

== See also ==
- Single-tier banking system
- Banking in the Soviet Union
- Forum check
