= Ignatyev =

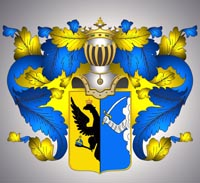
Ignatyev Imperial Russian noble family

Ignatyev, Ignatiev, or Ignatieff (Russian: Игнатьев; masculine) or Ignatyeva (Игнатьева; feminine) is a Russian surname derived from the name Ignatius, in Russian, Ignatiy/Ignaty. In the Imperial Russia the Ignatievs noble family was established sometimes in the 17th century as a cadet branch of the Pleshchevs family from Chernihiv (Czernihów). Along with Pleshchevs, the Ignatievs family takes its roots from a Muscovite boyar Theodore Biakont who emigrated from Chernihiv to Moscow sometime in the 14th century, see Alexius, Metropolitan of Kiev.

Ihnatyev and Ihnatiev is a transliteration of the name from Belarusian and Ukrainian languages. For more information, see Ge (Cyrillic).

Notable people with the surname include:

- Aleksandr Ignatyev (born 1971), Russian football player
- Alexsandr Ignatyev (1912–1998), Russian sculptor
- Alexandra Nikolaevna Ignatieff (born 1939), Franco-Russian countess and Princess of San Stefano
- Alexey Ignatyev (1877–1954), Russian count, statesman, and writer
- Andrey Alexandrovich Ignatiev (1900–1973), Soviet army officer and Hero of the Soviet Union
- Andrey Nikolayevich Ignatyev (1921–2012), Soviet army officer and Hero of the Soviet Union
- Ardalion Ignatyev (1930–1998), Soviet athlete
- Boris Ignatyev (1940–2026), Russian football manager and player
- Gavriil Ignatyev (1768–1852), Russian infantry general
- George Ignatieff (1913–1989), Canadian diplomat and recipient Pearson Medal of Peace (son of Pavel Ignatyev)
- Grigory Ignatyev (1846–1898), Russian military communications engineer and inventor
- Michael Ignatieff (born 1947), Canadian politician, academic and broadcaster (son of George Ignatieff)
- Mikhail Ignatyev (disambiguation), several people
- Nikolay Pavlovich Ignatyev (1832–1908), Russian statesman and diplomat
- Nikolay Ignatyev (pilot) (1917–1994), Soviet aircraft pilot and Hero of the Soviet Union
- Noel Ignatiev, history professor at the Massachusetts College of Art
- Pavel Ignatieff (1870–1945), Russian count and minister of education (son of Nikolay Pavlovich Ignatyev)
- Pavel Ignatyev (1973), Russian sculptor
- Semyon Ignatyev (1904–1983), head of the Soviet secret police
- Sergey Ignatyev (disambiguation), several people
- Countess Sophia Ignatieva, Russian countess
- Varnava Ignatyev (1867–1927), Russian/Soviet scientist in the field of children's and teenage hygiene
- Vitaly Ignatiev (born 1980), foreign minister and diplomat of Moldova's unrecognized breakaway region of Transnistria
- Vladislav Ignatyev (born 1987), Russian football player currently playing for Lokomotiv
- Vladyslav Ihnatyev (born 1997), Ukrainian football player

== See also ==
- Ignateva Cave, a limestone cave in the Ural mountains of Russia
- Ignatyeva (rural locality), a rural locality (a village) in Kurgan Oblast, Russia
