= MSU Faculty of Economics =

At Moscow State University

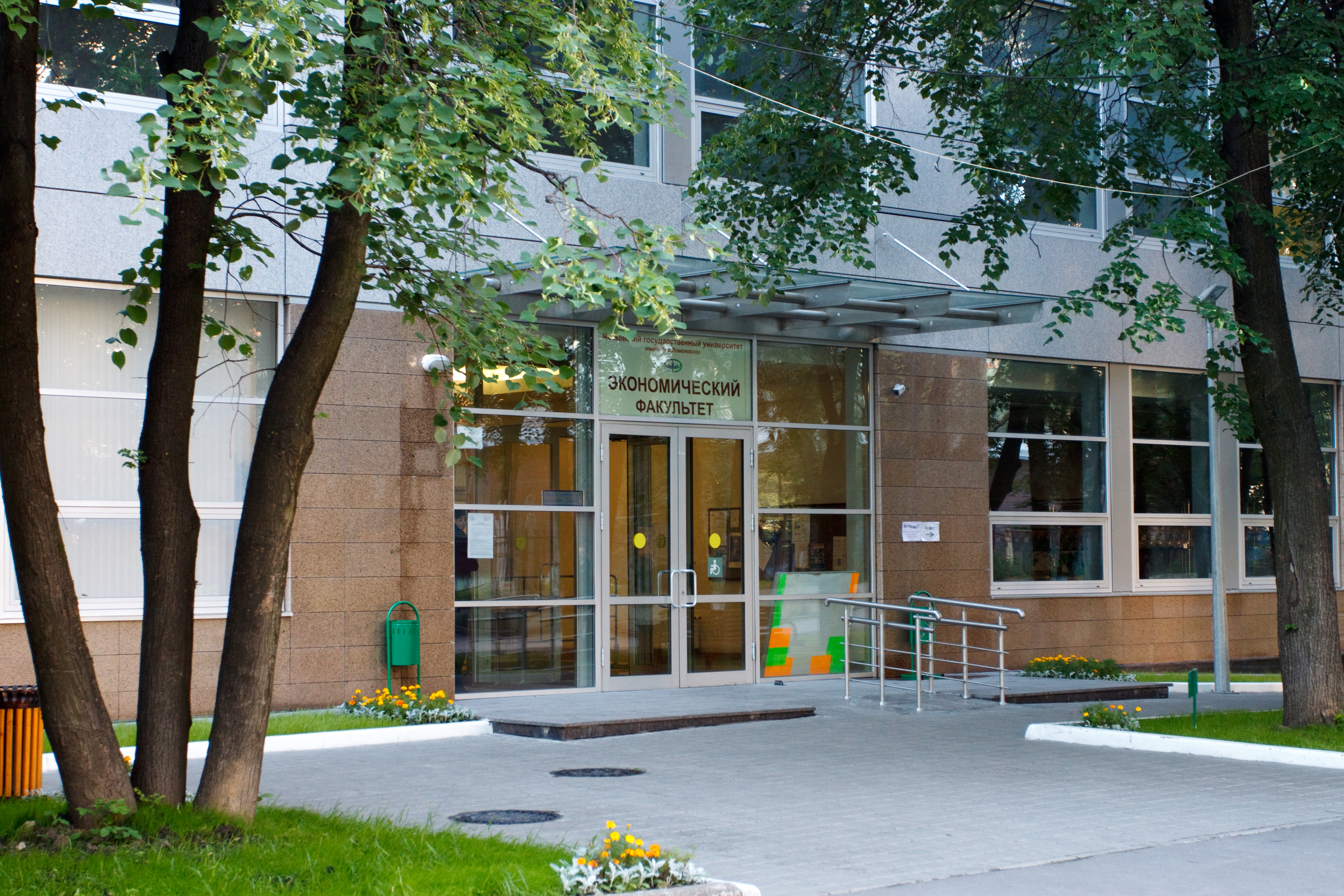
Entrance

MSU Faculty of Economics is a faculty of the Moscow State University. It prepares economists with university education. In 2005, the faculty included 350 teachers and research associates. 62 of them held Doctor of Sciences degree and 208 are Candidates of Sciences. There were 21 different academic departments and 14 research laboratories. Alexander Auzan is the incumbent Dean of the faculty (elected in 2013).

== History ==
The faculty was founded in 1941. Ivan Udaltsov became the first dean of the faculty (1941–1955). At first year, there were 28 students, 6 teachers and only one academic department - of political economy. The main goal of the enterprise was to prepare qualified specialists for science and management purposes. By mid-50s some new academic departments emerged and yearly intake rose to approximately 50 students.

At next decade, during the Khrushchev Thaw, the faculty started to pay more attention to applied disciplines and new ways for improving the economic system. The intake rose to 100 students per year. Next period, mid-60s - mid-80s, the faculty expands further to 200 students per year.

At mid-80s, there were significant changes due to new economic policy of Perestroika. Many new departments were established during this period, including 'Finance and Credit' department. MSU Faculty of Economics became the first major educational body to introduce the new system of academic degrees: bachelor and master. It helped to become more close to international community but possibly launched a conflict with the traditional Russian educational system.

In the 1990s, MSU Faculty of Economics has flourished due to economic liberalization and became one of the most desired places to study in (in Russia). The yearly intake gradually increased to 350 students. In 2009, MSU Faculty of Economics moved to a new building.

== Programs ==
There are two major undergraduate programs:

- Economics
- Management

According to Russian Constitution and Federal law "About education", tuition fees are waived for exceptionally good candidates (usually for 194 students with best results of the USE).

=== Tuition fees ===
Tuition fees 2018/19 are 420 000 rubles for Economics and 400 000 rubles for Management. Tuition fees are fixed for the whole 4-year education period.

== International partners ==
Faculty of Economics maintains relations with universities all over the world. Collaboration of the universities includes various exchange programs for students and teachers.

As of 2009, MSU Faculty of Economics signed cooperation agreements with the following international partners:

- Australia — Faculty of Economics and Business (E&B), University of Sydney
- Austria — Vienna University of Economics and Business (WU Wien)
- Czech Republic — CERGE-EI
- Estonia — International University Audentes
- France — University of Paris 1 Pantheon-Sorbonne, Paris Dauphine University, HEC Paris
- Germany — University of Bayreuth; Friedrich Schiller University of Jena (FSU); Georg-Simon-Ohm University of Applied Sciences Nuremberg; University of Bamberg; University of Münster, Goethe University Frankfurt
- Italy — Politecnico di Milano; University of Rome Tor Vergata
- Latvia — Riga Graduate School of Law
- Mexico — Centro de Investigación y Docencia Económicas
- Poland — Kozminski Business School
- Spain — Pompeu Fabra University
- Sweden — Jönköping International Business School
- Ukraine — National Taras Shevchenko University of Kyiv
- United Kingdom — European Business School London; Royal Holloway, University of London; Huddersfield University
- United States of America — J. Mack Robinson College of Business, Georgia State University; George Mason University; State University of New York at Canton

== Notable alumni ==
- Yegor Gaidar - economist, politician and author. He was the Acting Prime Minister of Russia from 15 June 1992 to 14 December 1992.
- Pyotr Aven - businessman and politician, President of the Alfa-Bank, billionaire.
- Alexander Zhukov - economist and politician. He is the Deputy Prime Minister of the Russian Federation since 9 March 2004.
- Ruben Vardanian - businessman, Chairman of the Board of Directors and CEO of the Troika Dialog. President of Skolkovo Moscow School of Management.
- Arkady Dvorkovich - economist, Assistant to the President of the Russian Federation since 13 May 2008.
- Elvira Nabiullina - Head of the Central Bank of Russia (since 2013).
- Yelizaveta Osetinskaya - Russian journalist and media manager, former editor-in-chief of the Russian Forbes (2011-2013) and RBC (2014-2016), founder of The Bell (Russian Media Outlet.
- Vladimir Yevtushenkov - tycoon, President of the large Russian holding company Sistema.
- Sergei Dubinin - economist, ex-Chairman of Central Bank of the Russian Federation (1995–1998).
- Sergei Ignatyev - economist, banker, current Chairman of Central Bank of the Russian Federation (since March 20, 2002).
- Yevgeny Yasin - economist, former Russian Minister for the Economy under Boris Yeltsin. He is currently a research director at the Higher School of Economics in Moscow.
- Yevgeny Primakov - politician and diplomat. He served as the Russian Foreign Minister and Prime Minister of Russia.
- Vadim Zvjaginsev - notable chess grandmaster. He developed his own modification of the Sicilian defense.
- Irina Hakamada - economist, politician and author. She ran in the 2004 Russian presidential election.
- Alexander Shokhin - economist, politician. He is the President of the Russian Union of Industrialists and Entrepreneurs.
- Igor Yurgens - Vice-President of the Russian Union of Industrialists and Entrepreneurs. He is also a professor at HSE.
- Andrey Kostin - banker and financier. President of the VTB Bank.
- Nikolay Nenovsky - former bulgarian banker and currently professor of economics in France.
- Gavriil Popov - politician and economist. First Mayor of Moscow.
- Gleb Fetisov - banker and politician. Billionaire (as of 2007).

== See also ==
- M.V. Lomonosov Moscow State University
- New Economic School
