= George Sava =

British surgeon and writer of Russian origin

George Sava (born George Alexis Bankoff, 15 October 1903 – 15 March 1996) was a British surgeon and prolific writer of Russian origin.

== Life ==
Described as a "Russian exile", he was born George Alexis Bankoff on 15 October 1903. The grandson of Countess Sophia Sergeyevna Ignatieva and Count Alexei Pavlovich Ignatiev (Russian: граф Алексей Павлович Игнатьев), the former governor of Siberia, who was assassinated in 1906 for his perceived role in a plot to overthrow the Tsar, Sava's life was devoted to surgery and the pursuit of his literary ambitions. He wrote approximately 120 books under the pseudonyms George Sava, George Borodin, George Braddon, Peter Conway, Alec Redwood, and others as well as numerous non-fiction books on surgical techniques under his real name. His father was a Bulgarian who, at a time when Bulgaria was part of the Ottoman Empire, migrated to Russia. He was a lieutenant in the White Russian Navy when he was seventeen. He was forced to perform emergency surgery without any medical training that saved the life of a comrade, which induced him to pursue a career in medicine and become a surgeon.

He was living and working London from the 1930s, and during World War II did some secret plastic surgery work for the Special Operations Executive.

He died on 15 March 1996, and was survived by five children.

== Works ==
He was the author of numerous books of medical autobiography, politics, history, and fiction.

His book, One Russian's Story, a biography of his father Ivan, tells something of his own life as well.

He was the author of the novel, Valley of the Forgotten People, which was published in London by Faber and Faber in 1941. The novel "They Came by Appointment" came soon after and is somewhat autobiographical.

In November 1942, Faber and Faber in London published his account of the Chetnik resistance movement in Serbia headed by General Draza Mihailovich, The Chetniks. Sava described the book in the Preface:

"The names of friends I have re-christened. I have altered dates and changed the names of places. This much is fiction: the rest is fact. The subsequent exploits of the guerrillas, the Chetniks, I have reconstructed from letters and reports. But I have a story to tell, and I shall not delay in the telling." (Preface, p. 8, The Chetniks, 1942)

He is also the author of The Healing Knife: A Surgeon's Destiny (1938). This book is an account of his life and his struggle to rise to the top of the medical profession from absolutely nothing.

In A Surgeon Remembers (1953), Sava recounted his most memorable operations. The dust jacket reads:

"What sort of cases are those which, most clearly, a surgeon remembers? This book of case histories by George Sava suggests an answer to that question. In terms of organs and limbs and in terms of people, the cases described and recorded here are as varied as any reader could wish. At the same time, as his Prologue and Epilogue and his commentaries show, each of them had something in common which presented the surgeon-author with a particular dilemma. It was not the consideration of the human factor, although this weighed heavily on his mind. It was the fact that these were all cases for which no clear-cut solution was to be found either in the textbooks or the canons of professional practice."

=== Fiction ===
- Those Borgias (1940)
- They Stayed in London (1941)
- Valley of Forgotten People (1941)
- Rasputin Speaks (1941)
- The Chetniks (1942)
- A Tale of Ten Cities (1943)
- Peace in Nobody's Time (1943)
- Cradle of splendour (1945)
- Land Fit for Heroes (1945)
- Red Surgeon (1945)
- This Thing Called Ballet (1945)
- The Boon of the Atom (1946)
- Link of Two Hearts (1946)
- Living Tapestry (1946)
- Twice the Clock Round: One Day of a Surgeon's Life (1948)
- One Horizon (1948)
- Pillar of Fire (1948)
- The Man of Kerioth (1949)
- The Shadow On the Path (1949)
- Strange Cases (1950)
- A Boy in Samarkand (1950)
- Invitation to Ballet (1950)
- A Doctor's Odyssey (1951)
- Patients' Progress (1952)
- Austrian Concerto: A Romantic Life of Mozart (1952)
- Caught By Revolution (1952)
- Flight from the Palace (1953)
- They Come by Appointment (1955)
- Bride of Neptune (1955)
- The Charm of Ballet (1955)
- Surgery and Crime (1957)
- All This and Surgery Too (1958)
- Time Off for Death (1958)
- The Emperor Story (1959)
- The Way of a Surgeon (1959)
- Surgery Holds the Door (1960)
- A Surgeon in Rome: Or, Passeggiata Romana (1961)
- A Surgeon in California (1962)
- Appointments in Rome (1963)
- Surgeon in New Zealand (1964)
- A Surgeon in Cyprus (1965)
- A Surgeon in Australia (1966)
- Punishment Deferred (1966)
- Man Without Label (1967)
- Sex, Surgery, People (1967)
- Alias Doctor Holtzmann (1968)
- Gates of Heaven are Narrow (1968)
- In Quest of Health (1968)
- Bitter-sweet Surgery (1969)
- City of Cain (1969)
- The Imperfect Surgeon (1969)
- Nothing Sacred (1970)
- Of Guilt Possessed (1970)
- Stranger in Harley Street (1970)
- Beloved Nemesis (1971)
- Skeleton for My Mate (1971)
- On the Wings of Angels (1972)
- Sins of Andrea (1972)
- Tell Your Grief Softly (1972)
- Cocaine for Breakfast (1973)
- Return from the Valley (1973)
- Every Sweet Hath Its Sour (1974)
- Sheilah of Buckleigh Manor (1974)
- Of Men and Medicine (1976)
- Pretty Polly (1976)
- Crusader's Clinic (1977)
- Mary, Mary Quite Contrary (1977)
- No Man is Perfect (1979)
- Secret Surgeon (1979)
- Stranger in His Skull (1979)
- Crimson Eclipse (1980)
- Magician of Medeena (1980)
- Mickey and His Friends (1980)
- Surgeon and His Knife (1980)
- Change of Heart (1981)
- Transforming Knife (1981)
- Innocence on Trial (1982)
- Killer Microbes (1982)
- Price of Prejudice (1982)
- Betrayal in Style (1983)
- Edge of the Scalpel (1983)
- Double Identity (1984)
- Smile Through Tears (1985)
- Bill of Indictment (1986)
- Crimes Unpunished (1987)
- Happiness Is Blind (1987)
- Rose by Any Other Name (1988)
- Roses Bloom Again (1989)

=== Non-Fiction ===
- The Healing Knife: A Surgeon's Destiny (1938)
- Beauty from the Surgeon's Knife (1939)
- A Surgeon's Destiny (1939)
- A Ring At the Door (1940)
- Donkey Serenade: Travels in Bulgaria (1940)
- School for War (1942)
- Russia Triumphant: The Story of the Russian People (1943)
- Plastic Surgery (1943)
- The Practice of Local Anaesthesia (1943)
- Surgeon's Symphony (1944)
- Soviet and Tsarist Siberia (1944)
- The Conquest of Brain Mysteries: Story and Secrets of the Human Mind (1947)
- The Conquest of the Unknown: The Story of the Endocrine Glands (1947)
- The Knife Heals Again (1948)
- No Crown of Laurels (1950)
- The Essential Eve: A Guide to Woman's Perfection (1952)
- The Story of Plastic Surgery (1952)
- A Surgeon Remembers (1953)
- Surgeon under Capricorn (1954)
- The Lure of Surgery (1955)
- Surgeon at Large (1956)
- Plastic Repair of Genito-urinary Defects (1956)
- Milestones in Medicine (1961)
- One Russian's Story (1970)
- The Years of the Healing Knife: A Surgeon's Autobiography (1976)
- How to Write a Book That Sells (1977)
- Living with Your Psoriasis (1978)
- Mourning Becomes Argentina (1979)
