= Gerashchenko =

Gerashchenko is a Russian and Ukrainian surname. It may refer to:

- Anton Gerashchenko (born 1979), Ukrainian politician and economist
- Viktor Gerashchenko (1937–2025), Soviet and Russian politician
