= Georgy Matyukhin =

Russian economist (1934–2026)

- Георгий Матюхин

Governor of the Central Bank of Russia
- In office 16 May 1992 – 16 June 1992
- Preceded by: himself as Central Bank of the RSFSR Chairman
- Succeeded by: Viktor Gerashchenko

Chairman of the Central Bank of the RSFSR
- In office 25 December 1990 – 16 May 1992
- Preceded by: Office established
- Succeeded by: himself

Personal details
- Born: 6 September 1934 Barnaul, West Siberian Krai, Russian SFSR, Soviet Union
- Died: 5 September 2026 (aged 91)
- Education: MGIMO; Moscow Financial Institute

Georgy Gavrilovich Matyukhin (Russian: Георгий Гаврилович Матюхин; 6 September 1934 – 5 September 2026) was a Soviet and Russian economist who served as chairman of the Central Bank of Russia from August 1990 to June 1992.

== Life and career ==
Georgy Gavrilovich Matyukhin was born in Barnaul on 6 September 1934. He graduated from the Semipalatinsk Geological Prospecting College, in 1953–1956, he worked as a geologist in Tajik SSR and Western Siberia.

In 1961, he graduated from the Moscow State Institute of International Relations. After graduating, he worked for 4 years in the central office of the First Chief Directorate of the KGB. Then he was sent to Uruguay, from where he was expelled with a group of Soviet intelligence officers.

From 1970, he worked at the International Investment Bank for 2 years full-time, then 11 years as a consultant. He completed correspondence postgraduate studies at the Moscow Financial Institute and defended his PhD thesis on the topic of "International Regional Banks".

From 1973 to 1980, he was an employee of the Institute of World Economy and International Relations of the USSR Academy of Sciences. He defended his doctoral dissertation on the topic of "Problems of Credit Money under Capitalism".

From 1980 to 1988, he was a Professor of the All-Union Academy of Foreign Trade.

From 1988 to 1990, he was a leading researcher at the Institute of the USA and Canada of the USSR Academy of Sciences.

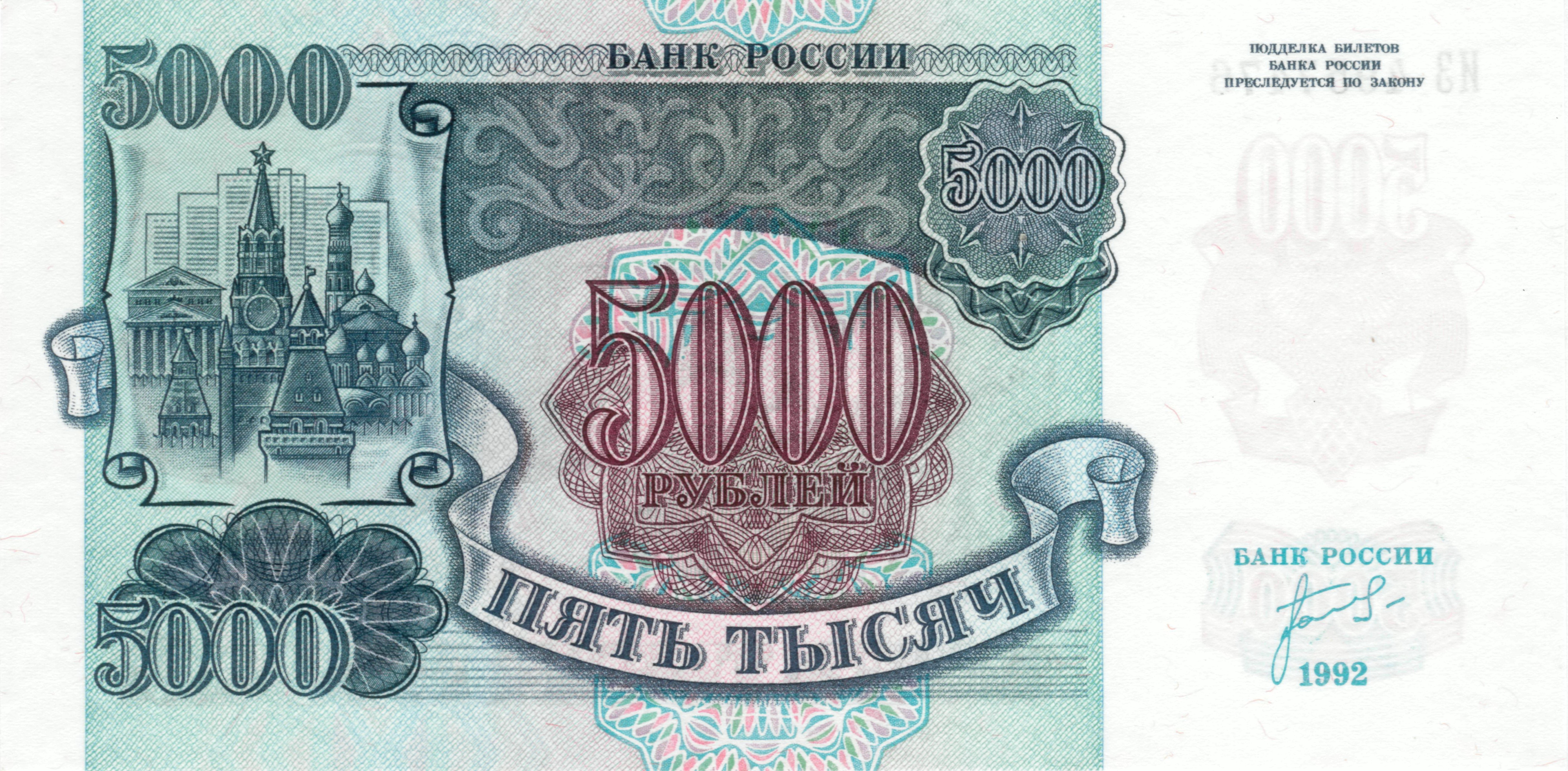
Autograph of the Chairman of the Board of Directors of the Central Bank of the Russian Federation Matyukhin on a 5,000 ruble banknote

On 7 August 1990, he was appointed acting chairman of the Board of the State Bank of the RSFSR on the recommendation of Ruslan Khasbulatov, whom he had previously assisted in preparing a number of economic bills. On 25 December 1990, he was appointed Chairman of the Central Bank of the RSFSR. The main achievement in this post was the creation of a two-tier banking system in Russia, when there is a Central Bank responsible for monetary policy and regulation of the banking sector, and commercial banks.

On 20 December 1991, by the resolution of the Supreme Soviet of the RSFSR, the State Bank of the USSR was abolished, the functions of the emission center, the monetary regulation body and the management of commercial banks were transferred to the Central Bank of the RSFSR (Bank of Russia).

Matyukhin spoke out against the actual confiscation of savings of Soviet citizens in Sberbank, proposing to preserve them against the backdrop of price liberalization by liberalizing the fee for money, that is, interest rates on deposits, bringing them closer to truly positive (in relation to inflation) values. However, rates on credit resources borrowed by the government from the population remained regulated and discriminatorily low (below the bank refinancing rate). On 16 June 1992, he was dismissed from the post of chairman of the Central Bank, being succeeded by Viktor Gerashchenko.

After his resignation, he held leading positions in the banks "Gorny Altai", "Noosfera", Sobinbank, "Dialog-Optim".

His grandson, Stanislav Anatolyevich Matyukhin, worked in the Bank of Russia for seven years as Deputy Head of the Department for Licensing of Joint-Stock Investment Funds, Management Companies, Specialized Depositories and Non-State Pension Funds of the Department for Regulation and Control over Collective Investments.

Matyukhin died on 5 September 2026, at the age of 91.
