= Nabiullin =

Nabiullin (Russian: Набиуллин) is a masculine surname of Tatar origin. Its feminine counterpart is Nabiullina. Notable people with the surname include:

- Elmir Nabiullin (born 1995), Russian football player
- Elvira Nabiullina (born 1963), Russian economist
