= Countess Alexandra Nikolaevna Ignatieff =

- Princess of San Stefano
- Born: 8 February 1939 (age 87); Paris, France
- Father: Count Nikolay Leonidovich Ignatyev
- Mother: Countess Yolande Durieu de Souzy

Countess Alexandra Nikolaevna Ignatieff, Princess of San Stefano (Russian: Александра Николаевна Игнатьева, Aleksandra Nikolayevna Ignatyeva; born 8 February 1939), is the daughter of Count Nikolay Leonidovich Ignatyev and Countess Yolande Durieu de Souzy. She was born in Paris and lived in the Château de Nançay. As the eldest of the elder branch descending from Count Nikolay Pavlovich Ignatyev, she is the current matriarch of the Ignatyev family.

== See also ==
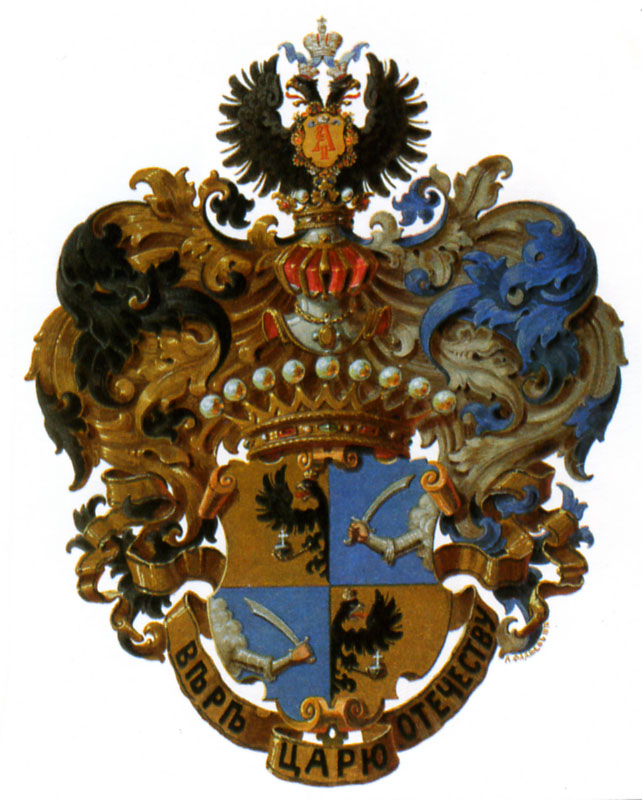
Ignatyev coat of arms

- Countess Sophia Ignatieva
