= Sergey Ignatyev =

Sergey Ignatyev may refer to:

- Sergey Ignatiev (politician) (1902–1984), a Soviet politician
- Sergey Ignatyev (economist) (born 1948), Russian economist, banker and official
- Sergey Ignatyev (artist) (born 1958), Uzbek artist and human rights defender
- Sergei Ignatyev (footballer) (born 1986), Russian footballer
- Sergei Ignatyev (boxer), Russian boxer who participated in the 2008 Boxing World Cup
