= Yaroslav Kuzminov =

Russian economist (born 1957)

- Ярослав Кузьминов
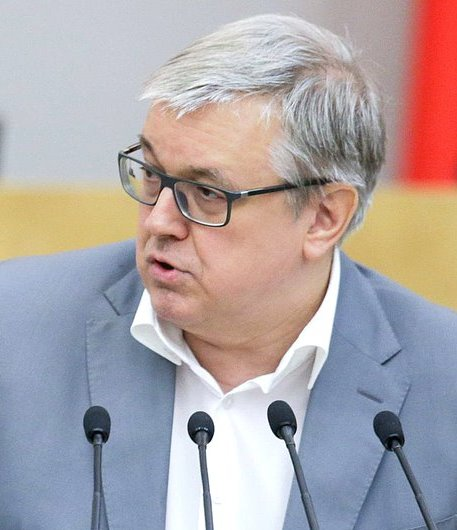
- Kuzminovin 2018

Member of the Moscow City Duma
- In office 2014–2019

Personal details
- Born: May 26, 1957 (age 69)
- Party: Independent
- Spouse: Elvira Nabiullina
- Education: Moscow State University
- Occupation: Economist
- Awards: Order "For Merit to the Fatherland"; Order of Honour; Medal "In Commemoration of the 850th Anniversary of Moscow"; Stolypin Medal; Ordre des Palmes académiques Certificate of Honor of the Government of the Russian Federation

Yaroslav Ivanovich Kuzminov (Russian: Ярослав Иванович Кузьмино́в; born May 26, 1957) is a Russian economist. He was the rector of the Higher School of Economics from 1992 to 2021.

He is married to Elvira Nabiullina.
