= Alexander Auzan =

Russian economist

Aleksandr Auzan
- Алекса́ндр Алекса́ндрович Ауза́н
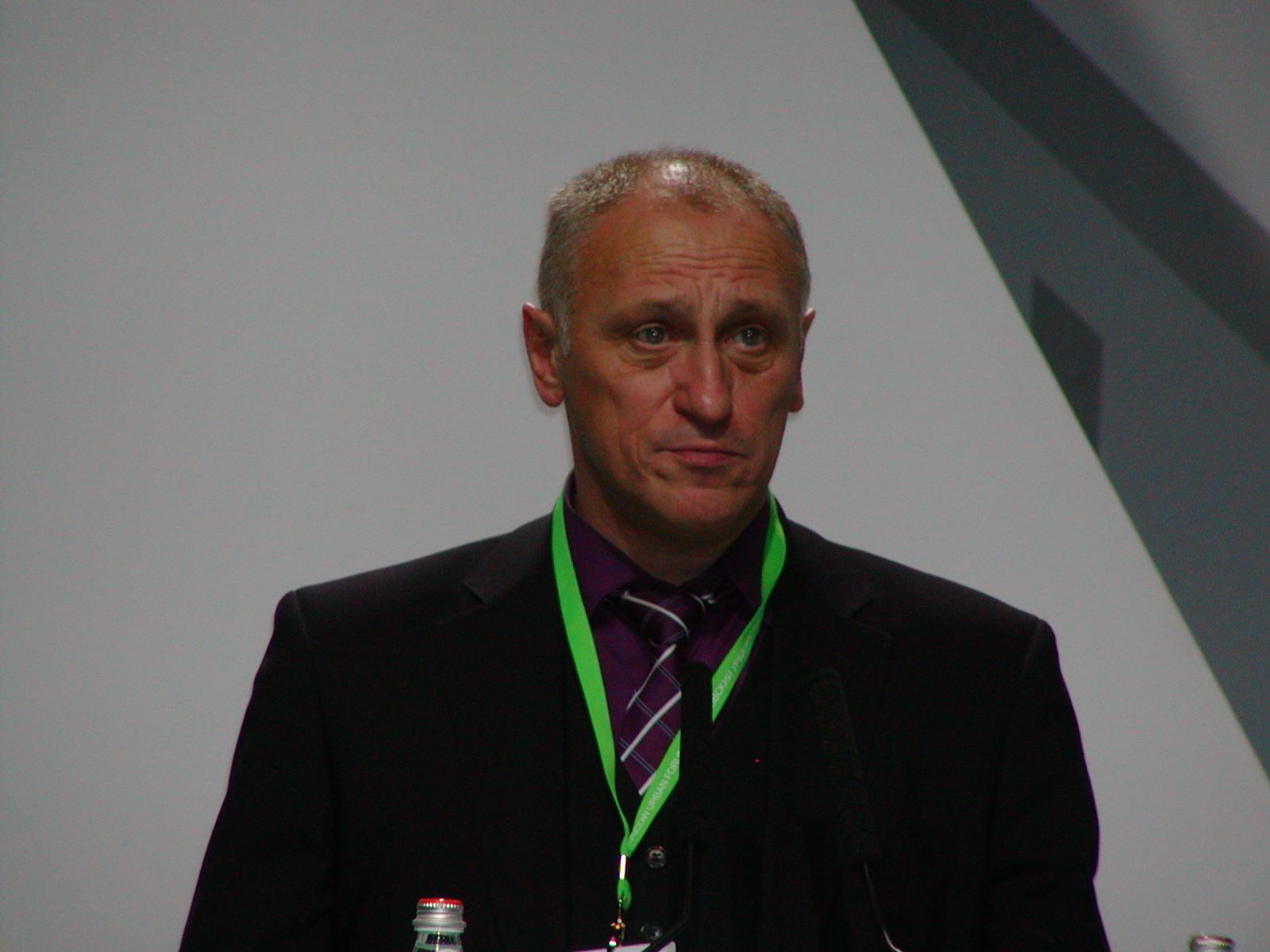
- Born: 11 July 1954 (age 72); Norilsk

Academic background
- Education: Moscow State University

Academic work
- Discipline: Institutional economics

Aleksandr Auzan (Russian: Алекса́ндр Алекса́ндрович Ауза́н, born 11 July 1954) is a Russian Economist, dean of the MSU Faculty of Economics, doctor of science, author of more than 130 scientific publications, member of numerous state councils and committees on strategic development of the Russian economics.

== Biography ==
Auzan was born in Norilsk on 11 July 1954. According to Alexander, his parents were employed in the nuclear industry and assigned to a production site in Norilsk after graduation. The family moved back to Moscow when Alexander was two month old.

According to Auzan, he failed his entry exams at the MSU Faculty of Economics in 1972 and promised himself not only to enter the following year, but to become a professor there someday. He actually succeeded to enter the university in 1973 and started teaching there in 1983.

Auzan started teaching in 1983, he was promoted to senior lecturer in 1987 and became an assistant professor in 1989. In 1994 he defended his doctoral thesis. In 2011 he became chair of the Faculty of Economics and in 2013 he was promoted to dean.

In the 1990s Auzan was one of the founders of the Russian Consumer's Protective Rights Association.

In 2005-2011 he headed the Association of Russian Economic Think-Tanks.

During his career, Auzan headed and took chair in various governmental committees, including:

- Presidential Council for Civil Society and Human Rights
- Head of the Advisory Working Group of the Economic Council under the President of the Russian Federation
- Presidential Commission for Modernization and Technological Development of Russia's Economy
- Governmental Commission on Administrative Reform
- Public Council under the Ministry of Economic Development of Russia
- Expert Council on Contractual Relations with the Ministry of Economic Development of Russia
- Head of the Expert Group "Optimization of State's Presence — Reducing Regulatory Functions and Ensuring Transparency and Feedback from Citizens and Businesses".

Auzan was among the few professors who recommended revoking Vladimir Medinsky's doctorate during the plagiarism scandal.

== Academic and professional interests ==
Auzan specializes in New institutional economics, social contract, Consumer protection, Civil society. He is a strong believer in cultural effect on economics, he sees perspectives in modernization and development of ‘human capital’.

== Publications ==
Auzan has published more than 130 scientific articles, he wrote 4 monographs, several university textbooks and several popular science books, including:

- Where do we live? (2005)
- Re-establishing the state: the social contract(2006)
- National values and modernisation (2010)
- Institutional Economics: The New Institutional Economic Theory (2011)
- Экономика всего. Как институты определяют нашу жизнь (2013)
- The cultural codes of the economy. How values influence competition, democracy and people's welfare (2022).

Auzan is the editor-in-chief of Вестник Московского университета journal.

== Awards and accolades ==
Some of Alexander Auzan's accolades are:

- Gold Medal of Honour for Public Recognition (2002);
- Commendation of the President of the Russian Federation for a major contribution to the development of civil society institutions and the protection of human and civil rights and freedoms;
- Order of Friendship (2012) for Стратегия 2020;
- Medal by 'Association of Independent Centres of Economic Analysis' (2014);
- Yegor Gaidar Award for Outstanding Contribution to the Economics;
- Wassily Leontief Medal for 'Achievements in the Economics' (2015);
- All-Russian 'Reputation' prize for Financiers in the category Scientist of the Year (2019);
- Honorary professor of Peter the Great St. Petersburg Polytechnic University (2019).

== Sources ==
- Kloss, Ingomar (2001). Advertising Worldwide: Advertising Conditions in Selected Countries. Berlin: Springer. p. 214. ISBN 3-540-67713-5.
- Zweynert, Joachim (2018). When Ideas Fail: Economic Thought, the Failure of Transition and the Rise of Institutional Instability in Post-Soviet Russia. NY: Routledge. ISBN 978-1-138-55927-1.
- McAuley, Mary (2015). Human Rights in Russia: Citizens and the State from Perestroika to Putin. Croydon: I. B. Taurus. p. 138. ISBN 978-0-85772-585-1.
- Lehtisaari, Katja; Mustajoki, Arto (2017). Philosophical and Cultural Interpretations of Russian Modernisation. Routledge. ISBN 978-1-315-60038-3.
- Tambovtsev, Vitaly (2015). "The myth of the 'Culture code' in economic research". Russian Journal of Economics. 1 (3): 294–312. doi:10.1016/j.ruje.2015.12.006.
