= Banking in Russia =

Banking in Russia is subject to significant regulations as banks in the Russian Federation have to meet mandatory Russian legislation requirements, and comply with numerous Bank of Russia instructions and regulations.

== History ==
The modern Russian Federation inherited the Russian and central operations of the banking system of the Soviet Union, with a few big state banks (like Sberbank, Vnesheconombank, and VTB Bank).

=== 1998 financial crisis ===
In 1988, 41 commercial and cooperative banks were registered in the USSR, including 25 banks on the territory of the RSFSR. By January the 1st, 1990, the statutes of 225 commercial and cooperative banks were registered, including 184 in 1989. In 1990, in connection with the declaration of state sovereignty by the RSFSR, the Russian Republican Bank of the State Bank of the USSR and Russian banks of specialized banks were declared the property of the RSFSR. Also, the Supreme Council of the RSFSR decided to transform all institutions of state specialized banks in the autonomous republics, territories and regions into commercial banks before January 1, 1991. In this regard, the number of banks in the RSFSR increased several times in the second half of 1990. As a result, the number of banks in the Russian Federation was 1360 on January 1, 1992.

=== 2008 financial crisis ===
Beginning in early October 2008, several Russian banks failed due to liquidity issues related to US credit derivatives. Russian bank Globex barred customers from withdrawing money from their accounts on October 15, 2008, in the first bank run of the current global economic crisis.

=== 2010s ===
In June 2013 Elvira Nabiullina was appointed as the chairman of the Central Bank of Russia. In an interview with television channel Channel one she said Russia's Central Bank has no blacklists of banks subject to license revocation. She added that the Central Bank will not warn any bank about such measures. She said, "As a matter of fact, no one knows who might be the next, We cannot warn anyone. Moreover, it would be wrong to do that. I know not a single country worldwide where the central banks would warn about license revocation. It is not ruled out that in case a bank is warned, a mala fide owner or managers could divert assets, making settlements with the closest clients, so a rank and file depositor will finally receive much less money".

And so, in December 2013 Central Bank of Russia revoked licenses of three commercial banks, Investbank, Smolensky Bank and the Bank of Project Finance and later then Ecoprombank, Masterbank, Simbirsk and many others. State-run Agency for deposits’ insurance paid money to clients.

== Credit and debit cards ==
At the end of 2008, there were 119 million bank cards in circulation in Russia.

== Sanctions ==
In March 2014, amidst the annexation of Crimea by the Russian Federation, U.S. President Barack Obama announced sanctions on Rossiya Bank. International payment systems Visa Inc. and MasterCard suddenly stopped service of credit cards issued by the Rossiya Bank. Non-cash transactions of SMP Bank (owned by Rottenberg brothers) and Sobinbank (100% subsidiary of Rossiya) were also frozen. Many Russian residents turned to national banks operations although they still have no doubt in reliability of foreign transnational financial institutions.

== Banks ==
Largest banks in Russia in terms of net assets (millions of rubles) as of December 2020:

No.	Bank	Assets, in million rubles
1	Sberbank	32 421 026
2	VTB Bank	15 813 216
3	Gazprombank	7 613 174
4	Alfa-Bank	4 229 025
5	Rosselkhozbank	3 539 546
6	Credit Bank of Moscow	2 988 171
7	Otkritie FC Bank	2 530 760
8	Promsvyazbank	2 503 499
9	Sovcombank	1 576 708
10	Raiffeisenbank	1 432 353

== See also ==
- Banking in the Soviet Union
