= Russian National Reinsurance Company =

Russian reinsurer

Russian National Reinsurance Company (RNRC)
- Native name: Российская Национальная Перестраховочная Компания (РНПК)
- Formerly: National Reinsurance Company (NRC)
- Company type: Joint-Stock Company
- Industry: Financing
- Founded: July 29, 2016; 9 years ago in Moscow, Russia
- Founder: Central Bank of Russia
- Headquarters: Moscow, Russia
- Area served: Russia
- Key people: Natalia Karpova (CEO)
- Services: Reinsurance
- Owner: Central Bank of Russia
- Website: en.rnrc.ru

Russian National Reinsurance Company (RNRC) is the largest Russian reinsurance company. The Central Bank of Russia is a full shareholder of RNRC. The state-owned reinsurance company was established in 2016. RNRC is the largest in terms of the authorized share capital (RUB 71 billion) and second-largest in terms of paid-in capital (RUB 21.3 billion) on the domestic insurance market.

Fitch Ratings downgraded the rating of RNPK to CC on 14 March 2022, in the wake of the 2022 Russian invasion of Ukraine.

== History and ownership ==
The Central Bank of Russia owns RNRC. The state-owned reinsurance company was set up as provided for by Federal Law No. 363-FZ On Amendment of the Law of the Russian Federation "On Insurance Business in the Russian Federation" dated July 3, 2016 and Art.13.1-13.3 of Federal Law No. 4015-1 "On Insurance Business in the Russian Federation". The Company was set up by the Resolution of the Central Bank of the Russian Federation dated July 29, 2016 as Reinsurance Company NRC JSC (registered on August 3, 2016). NRC obtained reinsurance license PS No. 4351 on October 12, 2016.

In March 2022 the owner said it had raised the capitalization of the firm from 71 billion roubles to 300 billion roubles and increased its guaranteed capital to 750 billion roubles so that the firm could adequately reinsure sea-going vessels such as cargo ships and oil tankers in the wake of the sanctions imposed by the West over the 2022 Russian invasion of Ukraine.

== Company objectives ==
The low capacity of the Russian reinsurance market provided by domestic reinsurers has been a long-term concern of reinsurance specialists and insurance authorities. It depends on the insurance type and has varied over time from $10–20 million for a single risk in 2005 to $100 million in 2015. Reinsurance is a global and cross-border business, however, a too large share of risks and reinsurance premiums were ceded abroad instead of Russia where they could be invested in the national economy.

Sanctions imposed by the US and European Union have a detrimental impact on the ability to cede risks abroad even to reinsurers in the countries which formally do not support such sanctions. This was the case with risks from Iran after the imposition of economic sanctions against it.

There are also insurance business lines featuring very low frequency, but very high losses amount, i.e. risks with very rare but tremendous losses. Such risks are very hard to insure or reinsure due to the unavailability of any statistics or data to determine underwriting rates. That risks for Russia include destruction of dams of major HEPPs, accidents involving expensive space or infrastructure facilities, grate forest fires (and as well human-made) in populated areas, devastating floods, etc. Some risks require state reinsurance support due to high social or economic importance but low attractiveness in terms of economic efficiency for a single insurer or reinsurer. They include a wide range of risks in agricultural insurance), housing insurance against catastrophic events (flood, forest fire, earthquake, etc.).

Definite risks — especially in case of mandatory insurance — feature very specific underwriting procedures and regulatory framework in Russia, so they can’t be ceded to foreign reinsurers. In addition, a large number of risks may not be ceded abroad due to national security issues (e.g. if their reinsurance may lead to disclosure of state secrets) or economic security (insurance of state-guaranteed orders).

To address the above issues and restrictions, the Russsain authorities represented by the Central Bank of Russia set up RNRC with objectives and tasks including:

- Improvement of financial stability of Russian insurers (and, therefore, provision of better insurance conditions for the population and business);
- Provision of reinsurance capacity for insuring businesses or facilities subject to foreign trade sanctions;
- Provision of reinsurance protection for state-guaranteed orders, as well for risks not attractive from the commercial point of view which have high social, general economic, industrial or state importance;
- Control over risk ceding by Russian insurers abroad, counteracting illegal capital outflow under the pretense of reinsurance operations.

== Activity ==
RNRC delivers reinsurance solutions to Russian and foreign companies in non-life insurance industry on both a Treaty and Facultative basis.

=== Compulsory cession ===
From January 1, 2017, the provisions of Art.13.1-13.3 of Federal Law No. 4015-1 came into force that obliged all insurers to cede RNRC at least 10% in each reinsurance ceded, and RNRC to accept at least 10% of all the so-called sanction risks. While the RNRC may not accept any risks that are not subject to sanctions. In March 2022, the share of compulsory cession was increased to 50%.

=== Analytical reviews ===
The company regularly issues reports with the results of the analysis of the situation in the Russian reinsurance market. In addition, there are quarterly RNRC studies with a very detailed analysis of outgoing reinsurance of all Russian companies for the past quarter.

=== Ratings ===
Analytical Credit Rating Agency (ACRA) assigned RNPK a credit rating of AAA (RU) with a stable outlook (2017), and the rating agency Fitch Ratings - the financial stability rating BBB - with a positive outlook (2017). Both ratings were affirmed in 2018. In 2019 Fitch upgraded rating to BBB with a stable outlook and in 2020 affirmed RNRC Insurer Financial Strength (IFS) Rating at BBB' with a stable outlook (December 14, 2020). ACRA affirmed rating in 2019-2021.

Fitch downgraded the rating of RNPK to CC on 14 March 2022, in the wake of the 2022 Russian invasion of Ukraine. The key rating drivers were payment restriction risks (some obligations are denominated in foreign currencies), a weakened operating environment of the Russian insurance industry caused by deepening sanctions and Russia's policy responses, a weakened business profile, heightened investment risk primarily through exposure to state bonds and local securities markets, and access to reinsurance markets inasmuch as sanctions and payment restrictions could limit access to international reinsurance markets, thereby reducing risk management options for insurers.

=== Sanctions ===
The EU adopted sanctions in its 10th package in February 2023.
