= Alexey Ignatyev =

Russian military attaché and diplomat (1877–1954)

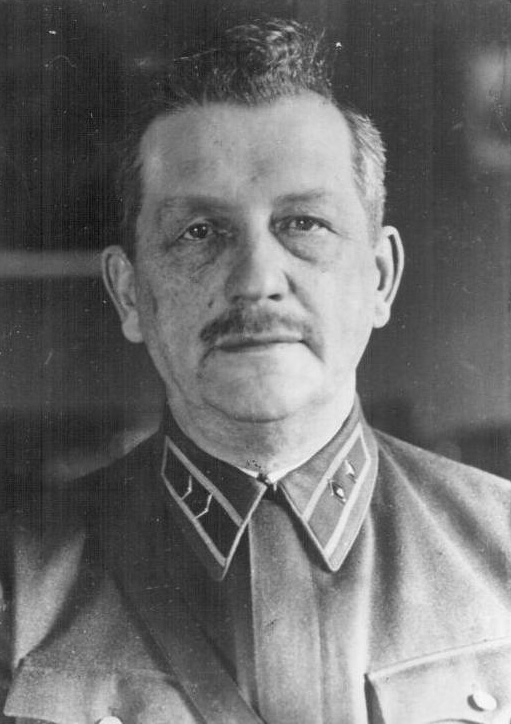
- Born: 1 March 1877; Saint Petersburg, Russian Empire
- Died: November 20, 1954 (aged 77); Moscow, Russian SFSR, Soviet Union
- Military career
- Allegiance: Russian Empire; Soviet Union
- Branch: Imperial Russian Army; Soviet Army
- Service years: 1897–1947
- Rank: Lieutenant general
- Conflicts: Russo-Japanese War

Count Alexey Alexeyevich Ignatyev (Russian: Алексе́й Алексе́евич Игна́тьев; 1 March [O.S. 17 February] 1877 – 20 November 1954) was a Russian and Soviet military attaché, diplomat, lieutenant and later a memoirist.

== Biography ==
Born in the aristocratic Ignatiev family as the son of General Alexei Ignatiev and Countess Sophia Ignatieva, he graduated from the Vladimir Kyiv Cadet Corps and was transferred to special classes of His Majesty's Page Corps.

After the Russo-Japanese War broke out in 1904, Count Ignatyev volunteered for the front and took part in the fighting with distinction as a staff officer. After the war, his first assignment was as a Russian military attaché in France. He was then appointed to Denmark, Sweden and Norway as a full military attaché. In the increasingly tense international situation on the eve of the First World War, he was sent back to Paris with the rank of colonel by order of Tsar Nicholas II on March 12, 1912, where he became Russia's military representative at the French headquarters after the outbreak of the First World War in 1914. For his services he was awarded the Commander's Cross of the Legion of Honor.

After the Russian February Revolution in 1917, he was appointed major general by the Provisional Government. After the October Revolution in Russia in 1917, Alexey Ignatyev put himself at the service of the newly established Soviet government. As the sole authorized person, he refused to hand over 225 million gold francs, which belonged to the Russian state and were deposited in Paris banks, to the counter-revolutionary Russian government in exile. Instead, he handed the money over to the Soviet government, which had no knowledge of the existence of these financial deposits.

Ignatyev declined the offer to become a French citizen and general, however, he remained in France in the years that followed and, after diplomatic relations were established between the Soviet Union and France, he worked in the Soviet trade mission in Paris. In 1935, Ignatyev returned to the Soviet Union. Here he received his old rank back from the Red Army and was later promoted to lieutenant general. He survived the purges of the armed forces of the late 30s unscathed. Ignatyev took on responsible tasks in military training and left active service in 1947. After his retirement, Ignatyev dedicated his career to literature and most famously published his book of memoirs named "Fifty Years of Service".

As Ignatiev grew older, he became frequently ill. In the fall of 1953 he became so seriously ill that he had to be hospitalized, where he died a year later and was buried at the Novodevichy Cemetery.

== Awards ==
- Order of St. Anne, 4th class with the inscription “For bravery”
- Order of St. Stanislaus, 3rd class with swords and bow
- Order of St. Vladimir, 4th degree with swords and bow
- Order of St. Stanislaus, 2nd class with swords
- Order of St. Anne, 2nd class
- Order of St. Vladimir, 3rd degree
- The highest favor
- Medal "For the Victory over Germany in the Great Patriotic War 1941–1945"
- Jubilee Medal "XX Years of the Workers' and Peasants' Red Army"
- Knight's Cross of the Legion of Honor (France)
- Officer's Cross of the Legion of Honor (France)
- Order of the Danebrog (Denmark)
- Order of the Iron Crown (Austria-Hungary)
- Order of the Star of Romania officer grade (Romania)
- Order of St. Olav (Norway)
