= National Foreign Exchange Association =

The National Foreign Exchange Association is a non-commercial association of commercial banks, currency exchanges, brokerage firms, and others dedicated to the development and improvement of a high standard foreign exchange market and money market in Russia. Founded in Moscow in 1999, the association had 74 members as of 2005. Among other activities, the National Foreign Exchange Association coordinates with the Bank of Russia in daily setting the Russian Overnight Index Average (Ruonia), which operates similarly to the European Eonia.

In 2010, members of the National Monetary Association were 69 financial organizations, including

- Commercial banks:
  - ABN AMRO
  - Alfa-Bank
  - Bank of Moscow
  - Gazprombank
  - ING-Eurasia and others
  - JPMorgan Chase
  - Raiffeisen Zentralbank
  - Sberbank of Russia
  - VEB.RF
  - VTB Bank
- Currency exchanges, including MICEX
- Brokerage firms, bank associations and other organizations.
