= Elvira Nabiullina =

Russian economist and Governor of the Bank of Russia

- Эльвира Набиуллина; Эльвира Нәбиуллина
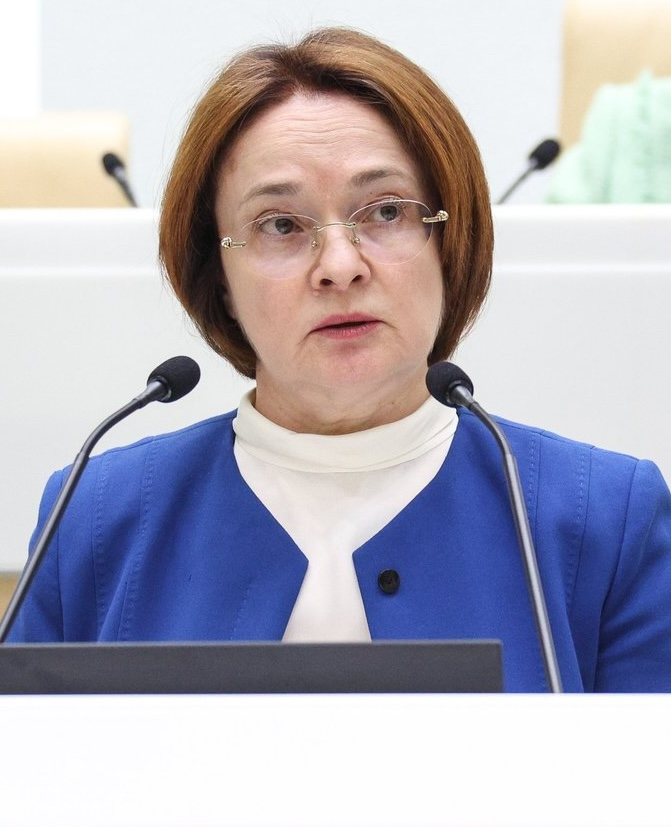
- Nabiullina in 2023

Governor of the Central Bank of Russia
- Incumbent
- Assumed office 24 June 2013
- Preceded by: Sergey Ignatyev

Aide to the President of Russia
- In office 22 May 2012 – 24 June 2013
- President: Vladimir Putin

Minister of Economic Development
- In office 24 September 2007 – 21 May 2012
- President: Vladimir Putin; Dmitry Medvedev
- Prime Minister: Viktor Zubkov; Vladimir Putin; Dmitry Medvedev
- Preceded by: German Gref
- Succeeded by: Andrey Belousov

Personal details
- Born: 29 October 1963 (age 62) Ufa, Bashkir ASSR, Russian SFSR, Soviet Union
- Party: Independent
- Spouse: Yaroslav Kuzminov
- Children: 1
- Education: Moscow State University

Elvira Sakhipzadovna Nabiullina (Note: Russian: Эльвира Сахипзадовна Набиуллина Tatar: Эльвира Сәхипзадә кызы Нәбиуллина, romanized: Elvira Säxipzadä qızı Näbiullina Bashkir: Эльвира Сәхипзада ҡыҙы Нәбиуллина) (born 29 October 1963) is a Russian economist and current governor of the Central Bank of Russia. She was President Vladimir Putin's economic adviser from May 2012 to June 2013 after serving as the minister of economic development from September 2007 to May 2012. As of 2019, she was listed as the 53rd most powerful woman in the world by Forbes. She has the federal state civilian service rank of 1st class Active State Councillor of the Russian Federation.

== Early life and education ==
Nabiullina was born in Ufa, Bashkir ASSR, on 29 October 1963 into an ethnic Tatar family. Her father, Sakhipzada Saitzadayevich, was a driver, while her mother, Zuleikha Khamatnurovna, was a factory manager. Nabiullina graduated from school No. 31 of Ufa, followed by the Moscow State University Faculty of Economics in 1986. In subsequent years, she was selected for the 2007 Yale World Fellows program.

== Career ==
Between 1991 and 1994, Nabiullina worked at the USSR Science and Industry Union and its successor, the Russian Union of Industrialists and Entrepreneurs. In 1994, she moved to the Ministry for Economic Development and Trade, where she rose to the level of deputy minister by 1997; she left the ministry in 1998. She spent the next two years with Sberbank as its chief executive and with former Economic Development and Trade Minister German Gref's non-governmental think tank, the Center for Strategic Development, before returning to the Ministry for Economic Development and Trade as first deputy in 2000. Between 2003 and her September 2007 appointment as minister, she chaired the Center for Strategic Development as well as an advisory committee preparing for Russia's 2006 presidency of the G8.

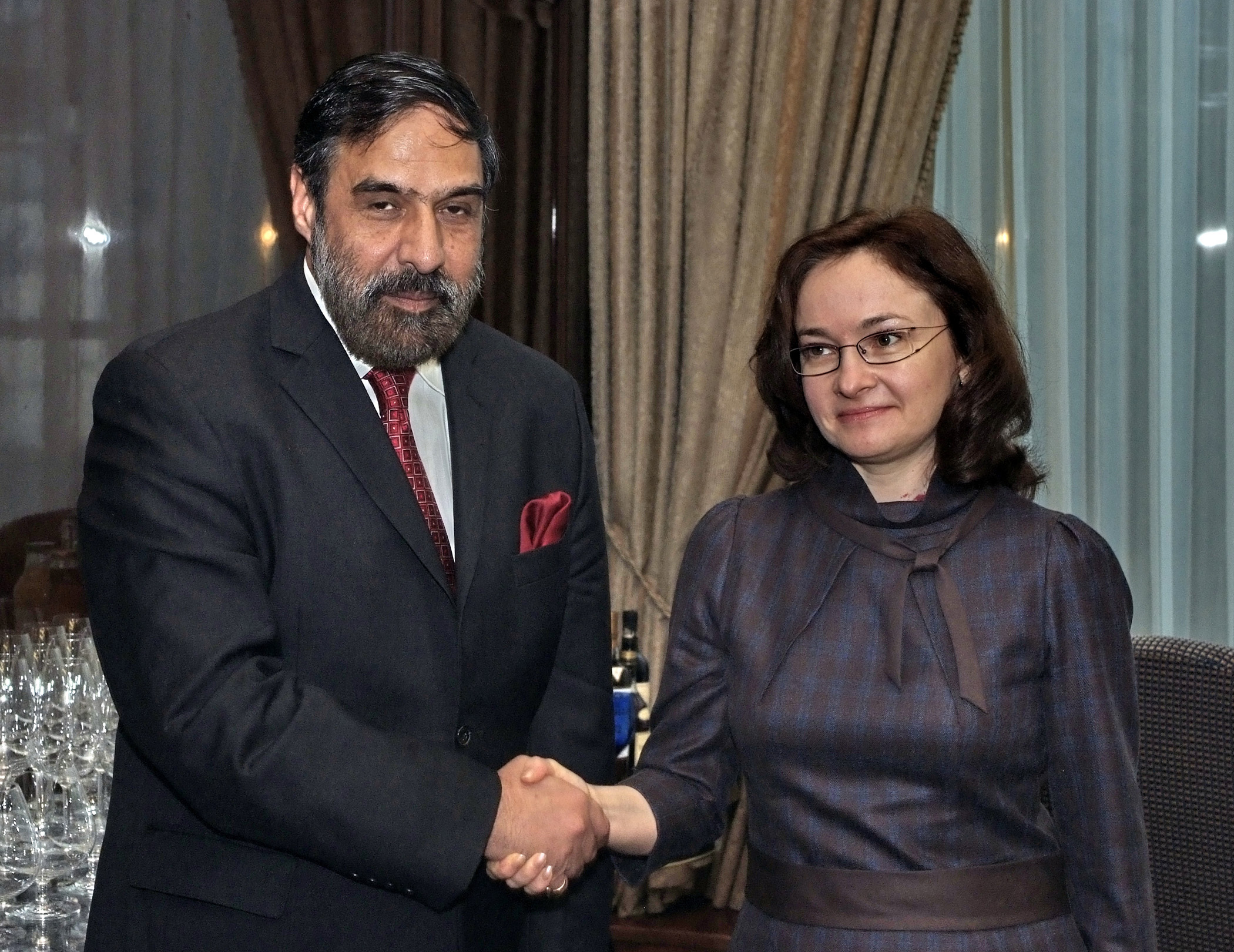
Nabiullina with Indian Minister of Commerce and Industry Anand Sharma, 2009

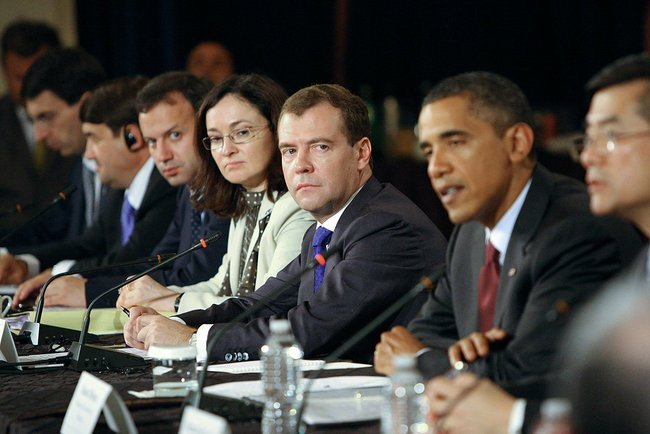
Nabiullina present at the U.S.–Russia Business Summit along with presidents Dmitry Medvedev and Barack Obama, 2010

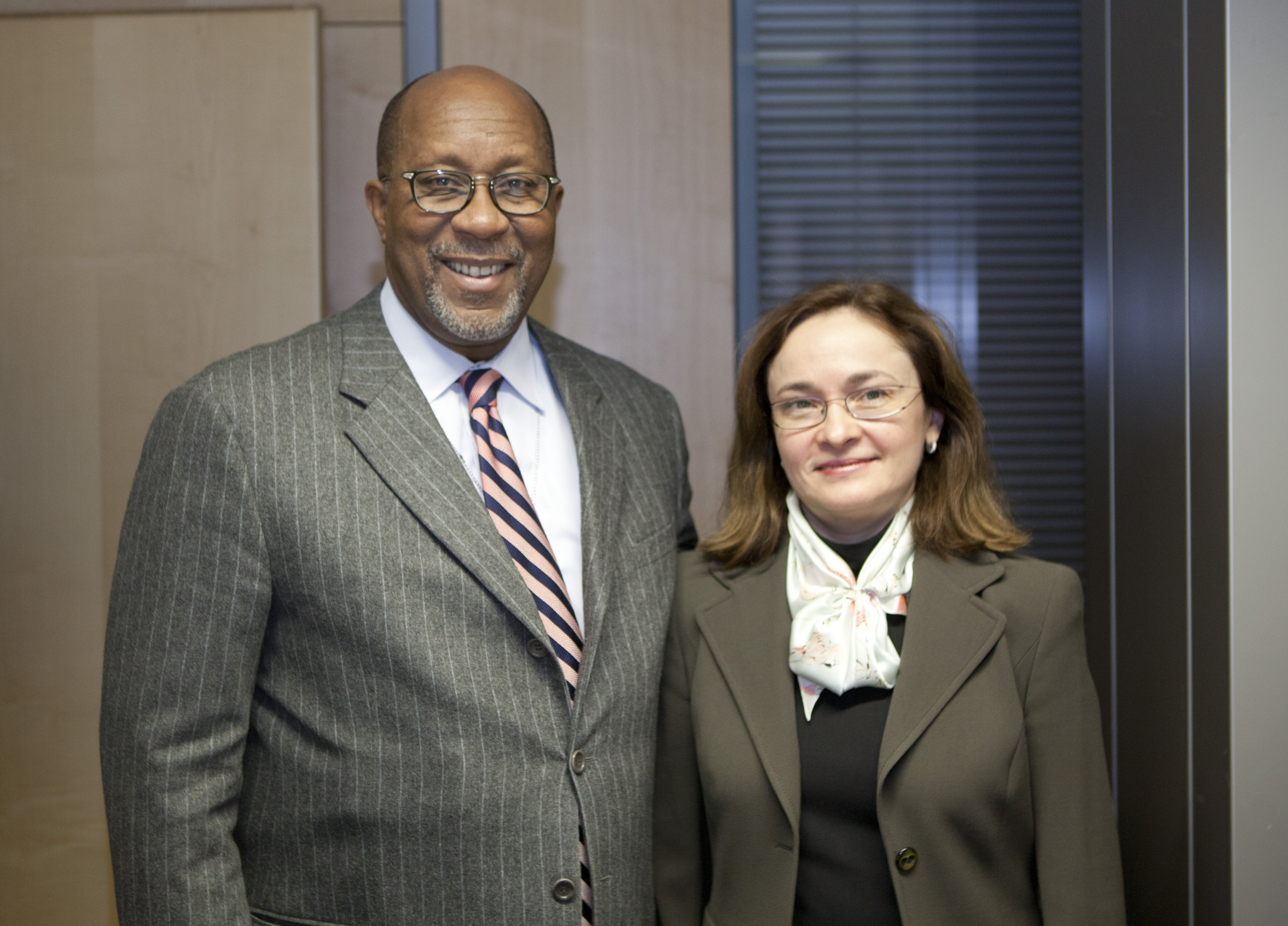
Nabiullina with United States Trade Representative Ron Kirk prior to the WTO session for Russia's accession to the World Trade Organization, 2011

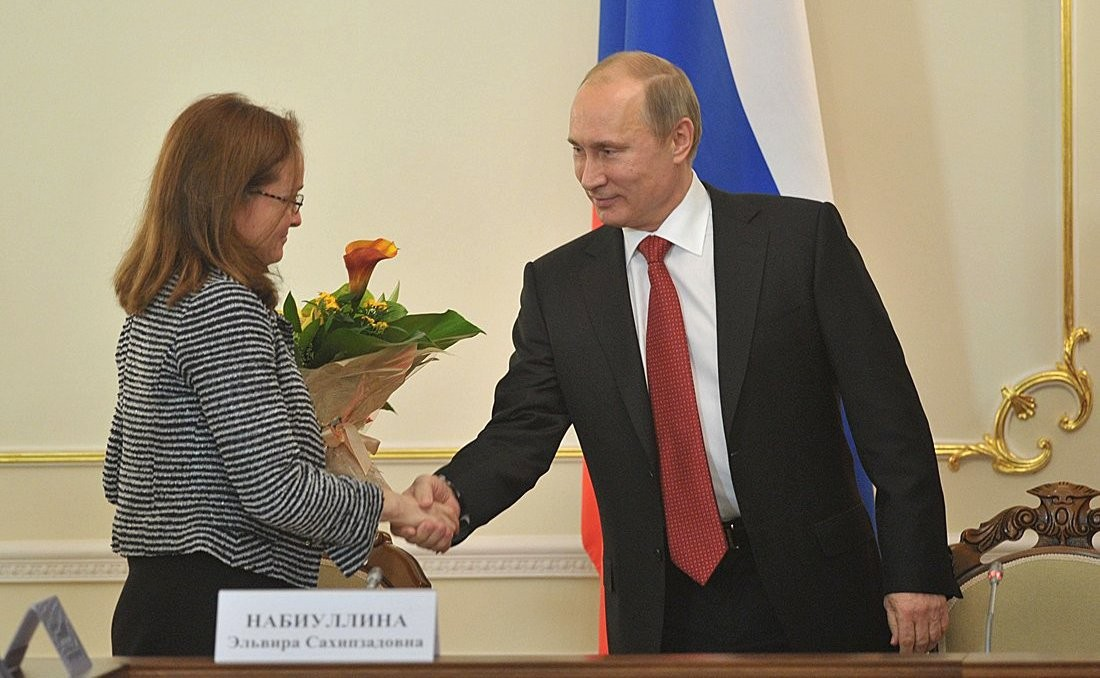
Vladimir Putin congratulates Nabiullina on her 49th birthday, 29 October 2012

Russian President Putin appointed Nabiullina to the post of Minister of Economic Development and Trade on 24 September 2007, replacing Gref. She found working with then-deputy Prime Minister and Finance Minister Alexei Kudrin "difficult but always interesting" and remained in that position until 21 May 2012. In 2012 she was one of six senior government figures to accompany Putin back to the Kremlin administration after Putin was elected president of Russia for a third term. From May 2012 to June 2013, she served as Aide to President Putin for Economic Affairs.

Succeeding Sergey Ignatyev in 2013, Nabiullina was appointed head of the Central Bank of Russia, becoming the second woman after Tatiana Paramonova (Note: Tatyana Vladimirovna Paramonova (Russian: Татьяна Владимировна Парамонова; born 24 October 1950 Moscow, Soviet Union), who had been first deputy of the Central Bank since 1992, became the acting head of the Central Bank of Russia on 15 October 1994 after Viktor Gerashchenko resigned following the events on 11 October 1994 known as "Black Tuesday". On 2 December 1994 during her tenure, law enforcement raided Most-Bank. In late April 1995, Vladimir Vinogradov was very critical of Paramonova's leadership of the Central Bank and, subsequently, the Duma never approved her as the governor of the Bank of Russia. On 24 August 1995 or "Black Thursday", the Moscow market for interbank loans collapsed which became the basis for Paramonova stepping down as acting head of the Central Bank on 8 November 1995. Sergey Konstantinovich Dubinin (Russian: Сергей Константинович Дубинин; born 10 December 1950 Moscow, Soviet Union), who was the former deputy chairman of the board of Imperial Bank which was led by Sergey Rodionov and focused on oil and natural gas supplies to East Germany and later to Germany including the oil-for-pipes program, replaced Paramonova and was approved by the Duma on 22 November 1995 to be the governor of the Central Bank of Russia. Previously, Sergey Dubinin had been the acting finance minister of Russia from January 1994 until October 1994 when he was fired following the events of "Black Tuesday".) to hold that position, and thus the first Russian woman in the G8. In May 2014, she was named one of the world's most powerful women by Forbes, which noted that she "has been given the difficult task of managing the ruble exchange rate during Russian military operation in Ukraine and annexation of Crimea and facilitating growth for an economy trying to avoid a recession". In an effort to stop the ruble's slide, the Central Bank of Russia, under her leadership, hiked interest rates, free-floated the exchange rate, and kept a cap on inflation, thus stabilizing the financial system and boosting foreign-investor confidence. Euromoney magazine named her their 2015 Central Bank Governor of the Year.

In 2017, the British magazine The Banker chose Nabiullina as "Central Banker of the Year, Europe".

On 28 February 2022, she gave a speech announcing a number of measures to combat the 2022 Russian financial crisis caused by the Russian invasion of Ukraine, including that the Central Bank of Russia's interest rate would rise to 20%, that the stock market be closed, and that capital controls would be instituted. In March 2022, it was reported that she had attempted to resign her position, only to be ordered to stay in post by Putin. Following the invasion, Nabiullina came under fire from both nationalist hawks, who questioned her loyalty to Putin, and Kremlin critics, who compared her to Hitler's Reich Minister of Armaments and War Production, Albert Speer. Despite the criticism, Nabiullina has managed to secure her long-standing position as head of the Central Bank thanks to Putin's trust and her effectiveness in maintaining macroeconomic stability. Insiders speak of the "Problem of 2027," as Nabiullina's contract and those of her team members expire that year. Working at the Central Bank pays less than in commercial banks and carries a higher risk of being hit by Western sanctions.

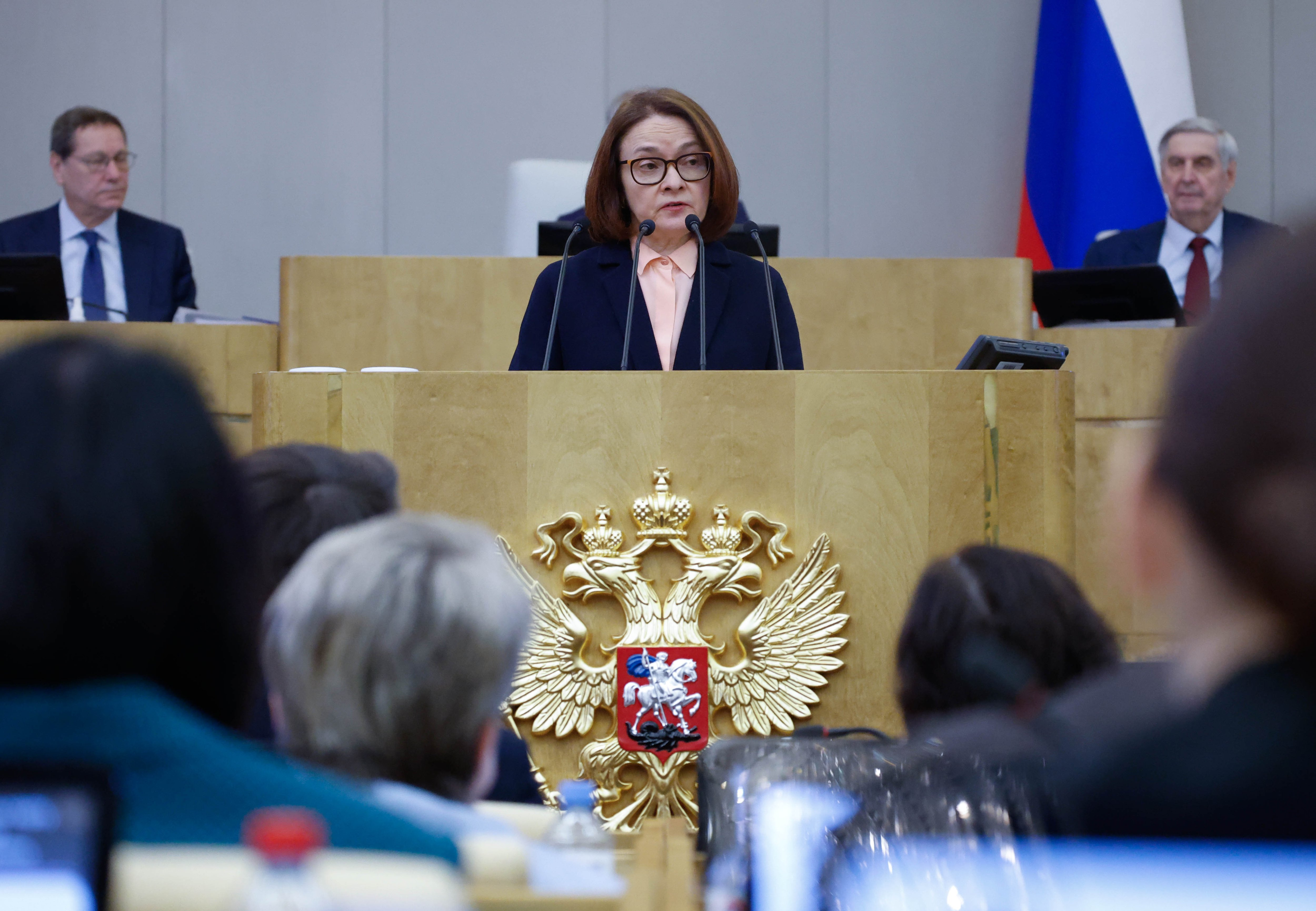
Nabiullina in 2026

Nabiullina is regarded as the éminence grise to German Gref. She is a protégé of former economics minister Yevgeny Yasin, although by his later admission, after many years of Nabiullina's work in Putin's team, Yasin's and Nabiullina's views had diverged.

=== "Nabiullina's brooch" ===
There is a belief in the Russian media that the head of the Central Bank uses brooches at public events to signal the state of the economy and the regulator's plans. In 2020, Nabiullina appeared at press conferences with a brooch of a blue wave, a dot, a tumbler, a stork. In March 2021, when the increase in the refinancing rate was announced for the first time in three years, she appeared with a hawk.

In September 2021, Nabiullina revealed the meaning of the brooches, which represent her own way of communication, an alternate language to "give the market a chance to reflect". Meanwhile, according to Nabiullina, the exact significance of any brooch should remain mysterious and is with rare exceptions ambiguous.

In her speech on 28 February 2022 announcing measures to alleviate the 2022 Russian financial crisis she wore black attire and no brooch. Sergei Guriev of Sciences Po speculated that it "should not be read as she disagreed with Putin's policy, but as a sign that it is time to bury normal monetary policy," while adding that "I am sure she was not part of the narrow circle making the decision on going to war."

== Views ==
Nabiullina tends to avoid making loud political statements. However, it is known that she considers the collapse of the Soviet Union a tragedy, while simultaneously being an advocate of liberal, market-based approaches. Nabiullina acknowledges that her views have evolved over her years in high office. She notes that she has come to place greater emphasis on macroeconomic stability, economic fairness, equality of approach in regulation, and stable, equal conditions for the development of the entire economy. Specifically, Nabiullina has been critical of the flaws in Russia's 1990s reforms, stating: "Probably the biggest question I ask myself regarding the Gaidar reforms is: was it necessary to carry out privatization quickly? — Yes. It was necessary to create a class of private owners. But as a result of the privatization that took place, we created an atmosphere of distrust towards private property. And this problem has been haunting us for many, many years."

Nabiullina is not a proponent of conspiracy theories and acknowledges that there are purely economic reasons why not everyone has an interest in Russia's economic development unfolding in a particular way, and that there is a struggle of objective interests over different vectors of this development. She cites the lobbying efforts of natural monopolies as an example. In her view, the role of the government is to make decisions that promote the country's economic growth to a greater extent.

According to Nabiullina, the Central Bank of Russia should be perceived as an institution independent of the Government and political influence, yet accountable to parliament. In a September 2013 interview with TASS, she specifically noted: "It is very important to clearly delineate the areas of responsibility of the government and the Central Bank, and not to have two keys to the same door".

Nabiullina attributes the slowdown in Russia's economic growth by the mid-2010s to the insufficient quality of government institutions (especially the judicial and law enforcement systems) and high administrative barriers for businesses. From her perspective, the future of the Russian economy depends on the development of domestic investment, increased labor productivity, labor mobility, and improved efficiency of natural monopolies.

== Personal life ==
In the late 1980s, while studying at the graduate school of Moscow State University, Nabiullina married a lecturer there, Yaroslav Kuzminov. Kuzminov became rector of National Research University Higher School of Economics (HSE) (1994–2021), since July 2021 the academic supervisor of the HSE. They have a son, Vasiliy (born 13 August 1988), at present a Research Fellow at the HSE.

Nabiullina is fluent in French and English. She has a deep appreciation for the arts, prefers classical music, and loves Russian Poetry of the Silver Age as well as French cinema. Observers note that she maintains a conservative style in clothing, favoring pieces from the Loro Piana. Foulard scarves and neckerchiefs, along with brooches, are a signature element of her wardrobe.

=== Sanctions ===
On 19 April 2022, following the 2022 Russian invasion of Ukraine, Nabiullina was sanctioned by Australia. On 30 September 2022, after the Russian annexation of southern and eastern Ukraine, she was sanctioned by the United States. She was also sanctioned by Canada, New Zealand and the United Kingdom. On 19 October, she was included on Ukraine's sanctions list.

== Awards ==
- Order of Honour (2018)
- Order "For Merit to the Fatherland", 4th class (2012)
- Order of Friendship (2011)
- Medal of the Order "For Merit to the Fatherland":
  - 1st class (2006)
  - 2nd class (2002)

== Notes ==
Government offices
Preceded by Sergey Ignatyev	Governor of the Central Bank of Russia; 2013–present	Incumbent
