= Association for Human Rights in Central Asia =

French human rights organization

The Association for Human Rights in Central Asia
- Association Droits de l’Homme en Asie Centrale
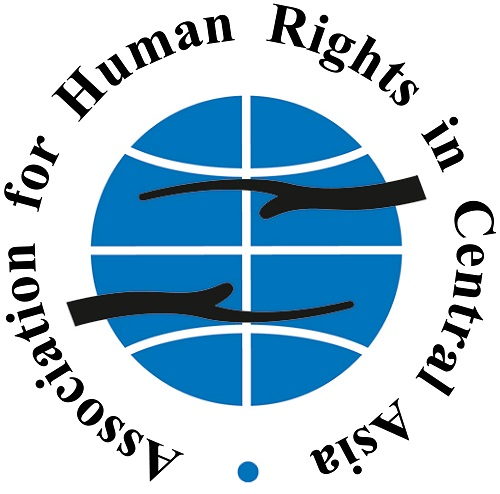
- Founder: Nadejda Atayeva, Yodgor Obid
- Founded at: Le Mans, France
- Type: Non-government organization (NGO)
- Headquarters: Le Mans, France
- President: Nadejda Ataeva
- Website: http://www.ahrca.org/

The Association for Human Rights in Central Asia (French: Association Droits de l'Homme en Asie Centrale, Russian: Ассоциация "Права человека в Центральной Азии", AHRCA) is a French independent human rights organization that conducts research on the observance of human rights in Kazakhstan, Kyrgyzstan, Tajikistan, Turkmenistan, and Uzbekistan, and also the situation of refugees from these countries. The slogan of the organization is "The right to be heard". Founded on November 8, 2006, in the city of Le Mans, Department of Sarthe, in France.

AHRCA protects fundamental human rights and freedoms, based on the principles of the Universal Declaration of Human Rights, using national and international mechanisms for the protection of human rights.

The Central Asian region, because of its geographical distance from a democratic Europe, the peculiarities of the development in recent years, the authoritarian structure of power and the corruption of the elites, has become a source of violations of fundamental human rights and freedoms.

== Members and leaders ==
The founders of the organization were citizens of Central Asian countries, persecuted for political reasons. Members of the association live in different countries, only the following persons publicly announced themselves as members of the organization: Alisher Abidov, Daniel Anderson, Igor Belijatskij, who are living in Norway, Natalia Bushueva - in Sweden; Mirrahmat Muminov (USA), Leila Nazgul Seiitbek and Yodgor Obid - in Austria; Alim Ataev, Sergey Ignatyev, Nadejda Atayeva - live in France. The rest prefer to participate in the organization on conditions of confidentiality in order to avoid harassment and discrimination of their relatives.

President of the Association for Human Rights in Central Asia (AHRCA) is a human rights defender Nadejda Atayeva.

== History ==
The creation of the Association was prompted by the tragic events in Andijan (Uzbekistan) in 2005. Then the government troops committed an inadequate use of firearms against protesting citizens, which led to casualties among the population. Arrests of human rights activists and independent journalists have been initiated, the flow of refugees from the country began. It became obvious that the consolidated assistance of political emigrants in the dissemination of information on human rights violations in Uzbekistan, on media activities, on the functioning of civil society institutions, as well as for supporting those who suffered from the dictatorial regime was extremely needed. This was the main factor in the creation of AHRCA.

The organization began to send collective appeals to European agencies, the UN, the US State Department with a request to help the victims of the Andijan tragedy and exert political pressure on official Tashkent. The Uzbek government did not even declare mourning for those killed in Andijan in May 2005.

Citizens of Central Asian countries, mostly citizens of Uzbekistan united under AHRCA and began to testify to the international community how the governments in the countries in this region fulfill their obligations under conventions in the field of human rights.

== Pressure by Uzbek authorities ==
In response to the statement "To clear Uzbek cotton from stains of forced child labor!" signed by a group of civil society activists and well-known human rights defenders, and a public statement by Nadejda Atayeva, a human rights activist whose organization (AHRCA) was behind the campaign to boycott Uzbek cotton, in which she stated that the exploitation of child labor by Uzbek authorities in cotton picking must stop, Uzbek law enforcement agencies began to exert pressure on the participants of the action who resided in Uzbekistan and on relatives of political emigrants. The initiators of the action - political immigrants began to receive a message about threats of seizure of the property remaining in the country, their relatives were being detained for several hours and forced to provide contact information to relatives living abroad. Despite the continuous pressure from Uzbek authorities Atayeva on behalf of the Association continues to inform the international community regarding the situation surrounding cotton production in Uzbekistan.

The next wave of activists fleeing the region began when political emigrants came to a rally on the occasion of the arrival of Islam Karimov in Brussels. The statement of the AHRCA "The Council of the European Union opens the door to dictators?" sparked a new wave of pressure on activists who supported the joint appeal "Free Europe opens its arms to bloody dictators?"

After the release of the "Open Letter to the President of the Czech Republic, Miloš Zeman on the forthcoming visit of the President of Uzbekistan Islam Karimov", made by thirteen human rights organizations exerted external pressure to cancel Karimov's visit to Prague and received public support. Participants in the project "Art and Human Rights" of the Association for Human Rights in Central Asia in those days published a poster "Islam Karimov, not in Prague, but in The Hague", which was widely distributed in social networks and the media. On the pages of AHRCA in social networks there were comments of anonymous provocative nature.

On September 3, 2016, Euronews broadcast an interview with the president of the Association for Human Rights in Central Asia, Nadejda Atayeva, who regretted that Islam Karimov managed to escape punishment for crimes that were committed under his leadership in Uzbekistan. In response, massive harassment began against her. Her home address was published on the Internet by provocateurs and she received hundreds of threats of reprisal on her addresses. She filed a complaint in this regard to the commissariat in the place of her residence.

=== Andijan events and the reaction of the international community ===
Information that the Uzbek authorities deliberately destroy evidence of the death of civilians, began to arrive regularly. The country enforced limited freedom of movement, and Andijan became a closed city. Arrests of human rights activists, supporting the European Union's demand for an international investigation into the Andijan events with the participation of independent experts and journalists began. The immediate witnesses of the bloodshed continued to disappear.

Diplomats, representatives of the European Commission, members of the European Parliament in the first days after the Andijan tragedy immediately responded to requests from representatives of the organization for help.

For several months, the EU was negotiating with the Uzbek authorities about an international investigation into the Andijan events with the participation of independent experts. In response to the refusal of the Uzbek government, the EU imposed sanctions.

The position of the United Europe gave hope that the democratic world can influence the despotic regime of Karimov. But three years later, the European Union abolished most of the sanctions, leaving only an embargo on the sale of weapons to Uzbekistan. It was stated that the lifting of sanctions and the intensification of the dialogue on human rights will lead to positive developments in this area. With Shavkat Mirziyeev coming to power, the government of Uzbekistan started fulfilling the requirements of the European Union, launched in 2009 with the lifting of sanctions in 2009 and the resolution of the European Parliament adopted in October 2014.
