= Sergey Ignatyev (artist) =

Sergey Yurievich Ignatyev
- Born: 14 June 1958 (age 68); Tashkent, Uzbekistan
- Occupation: Artist

Sergey Yurievich Ignatyev (born 14 June 1958) is an Uzbek artist and human rights defender, living in the United States. He is an official representative of the Association for Human Rights in Central Asia in the US.

== Biography ==
=== Early life and education ===
Sergey Ignatyev was born on 14 June 1958 in Tashkent, Uzbekistan. His mother, Irina Ignatyeva, was an art critic who worked as an art history teacher in the Tashkent Theatre and Arts Institute. On the other hand, his father, Yuriy Stepchuk was a Soviet cinema actor and theatre stage director. Ignatyev studied at the National College of Arts from 1973 to 1977. Afterwards, he transferred at the Tashkent Theatre and Arts Institute (TTAI) for six years. Two years after graduating, he taught graphic arts at his alma mater until 1988.

=== 1985-1987: Early exhibitions and censorship of works ===
While teaching in 1985, Ignatyev initiated an exhibition in Karl Marx Street or Tashkent Broadway, together with Sergey Vasilyev, Igor Reznikov, and Vladimir Zherebtsov. They exhibited their works in front of the Maksim Gorky Theatre, and also painted portraits for passers-by. Within a month, dozens of other artists joined and worked alongside them. As a result, the artists earned enough money to refurbish their own studio located in the former boiler room of a residential apartment bloc premise. They worked from there up until 1991. On the other hand, the street, where the open air exhibition was first launched, is now known as "Artists' Lane". Even today, one can buy paintings and souvenirs from free artists on the street.

In 1986, Sergey Ignatyev joined the Uzbekistan Artists' Union (UAU). The same year, he started working at the art enterprise Rassom (Artist), through which Uzbek artists could receive government orders. The next year, however, he was dismissed from Rassom, which caused him an automatic expulsion from the Artists' Union as well. The chairman of Rassom, Kutlug Bashirov, provides the official reason for his dismissal, stating that Ignatyev had: "...unauthorized use of production resources towards personal goals". According to Ignatyev, however, it was his participation in an exhibition in the summer of 1987 that he was expelled. He argues that his exhibition was taken place on the park in front of the National Security Service in Tashkent, which was not far from Lenin Square underground station where the group of young artists had set up an exhibition of their own works. During those times, all art exhibitions should have been set up in the Central Exhibition Hall of the Arts Academy of Uzbekistan, Ilkhom Theatre. However, Ignatyev's group organized their own exhibition without the authorization of the committee and the Uzbekistan Artists' Union, the institutions who determine which paintings could be exhibited for public view.

Basharov's reaction was rather blunt and caused a wave of protest among the young artists. They openly resented the fact that it was not possible for young artists to display paintings without censorship; their work was evaluated with prejudice and any creativity caused a backlash. In fact, during Gorbachev's perestroika, many thought that it was safe to voice criticism. In Uzbekistan, however, this policy of openness proved to be an illusion. In short, there was always a way to restrain active citizens and to drive them out of the country.

In autumn of 1987, Ignatyev participated in the National Exhibition of Young Artists in Tashkent. The exhibition took place in the Central Exhibition Hall, where his triptych "Prisoner", "Pomegranate", and "Iron and Milk" paintings were exhibited. This exhibition was presented to the public as the first exhibition of young artists without censorship during perestroika. Upon the evaluation of the Ministry of Culture of Uzbekistan, these works were recognized as heavily political. As a consequence, Sergey Ignatyev was blacklisted by KGB.

=== 1988-present: Migrating to USA and creative activity ===
In 1988, Sergey Ignatyev immigrated to the USA. Before his departure, however, Sergey Ignatyev had to burn some 30 works. This was a common practice among artists fleeing Soviet Uzbekistan. He settled in Miami, Florida and received his US citizenship in 1998. Since his USSR citizenship was revoked after, his attempts to rescue his works from the country were not successful.

From 2003 to 2008, Ignatyev did not paint for objective reasons. Afterwards, he restored cooperation with art galleries and designer companies, particularly with Deco Productions, Barton G, and Me Productions among others. In 2011, Ignatyev became a coordinator of the art-project "Arts and Human Rights" under the aegis of the Association for Human Rights in Central Asia. Independent artists from Central Asia take part in the project, although their names are not disclosed for security reasons. His idea is to unite independent artists living in the countries of Central Asia and émigré artists for promotion of their creative works, for liaising them with western galleries, and for publishing of catalogs among others.

At present, within the framework of the art-project, a series of mobile art exhibitions dedicated to human rights is being prepared. The title of the first exhibition is "Letters from Prisons". 55 works have been prepared based on the letters written by prisoners. The exhibition is designed as an action to draw the attention of the democratic community to the fact there are some 10 thousand political prisoners in Uzbekistan. All of them are continuously subjected to different and various kinds of torture. For example, they are kept in conditions conducive to the spread of infectious and venereal diseases. Unlawful kinds of illegal punishments are also widespread. In the archive of the Association for Human Rights in Central Asia, there are about 20 letters where prisoners described torture, which they are subjected to inhuman conditions in custody. However, they recount that representatives of Red Cross are not allowed to see them nor lawyers or human rights defenders. This situation is reported to the office of the UN Special Rapporteur on torture on a regular basis, but he has been denied for entry to Uzbekistan for the past 8 years. Therefore, the letters from prisoners inspired Sergey Ignatyev to create a series of paintings under the title of "Letters from Prisons".

== Public activity ==
In 2008, Sergey Ignatyev joined the Association for Human Rights in Central Asia. In 2011, he joined the board of founders of the association, and is the official representative of the association in the US and coordinator of the project "Arts and Human Rights".

== Exhibitions ==
- 1989 – the first personal exhibition in the gallery "Jeannette" in Miami, Florida. Alex Daoud, the mayor of Miami at that time took part and handed Ignatyev a key to the city.
- 1990 – the gallery "Virginia Miller" was exhibited in "Russian Political Art" in Miami. In particular, Ignatyev's personal exhibition was held during the summit between Mikhail Gorbachev and Ronald Reagan in Washington. Gorbachov brought the exhibition "Political Caricature in the USSR", while the owner of the gallery "Virginia Miller" initiated the exhibition in Miami. Concurrently, Sergey Ignatyev's personal exhibition was held.
- 1991 – held in the "Virginia Miller" gallery, Miami, Florida
- 1991 – Ignatyev's exhibition of figurative art was held in the "Virginia Miller" gallery, Miami, Florida
- 1993 – Art-Centre Bakehouse, Miami, Florida
- 1994 – Cultural Centre, Miami, Florida
- 1995 – The Museum of Modern Arts, where the exhibition was held in St Petersburg, Florida, bought Ignatyev's painting "Red Angel"
- 2002 – two paintings by Sergey Ignatyev namely "Chess" and "Saints" were exhibited at the International Artexpo New York.
