= Central Bank of Russia =

Central Bank of the Russian Federation

Central Bank of the Russian Federation Центральный банк Российской Федерации

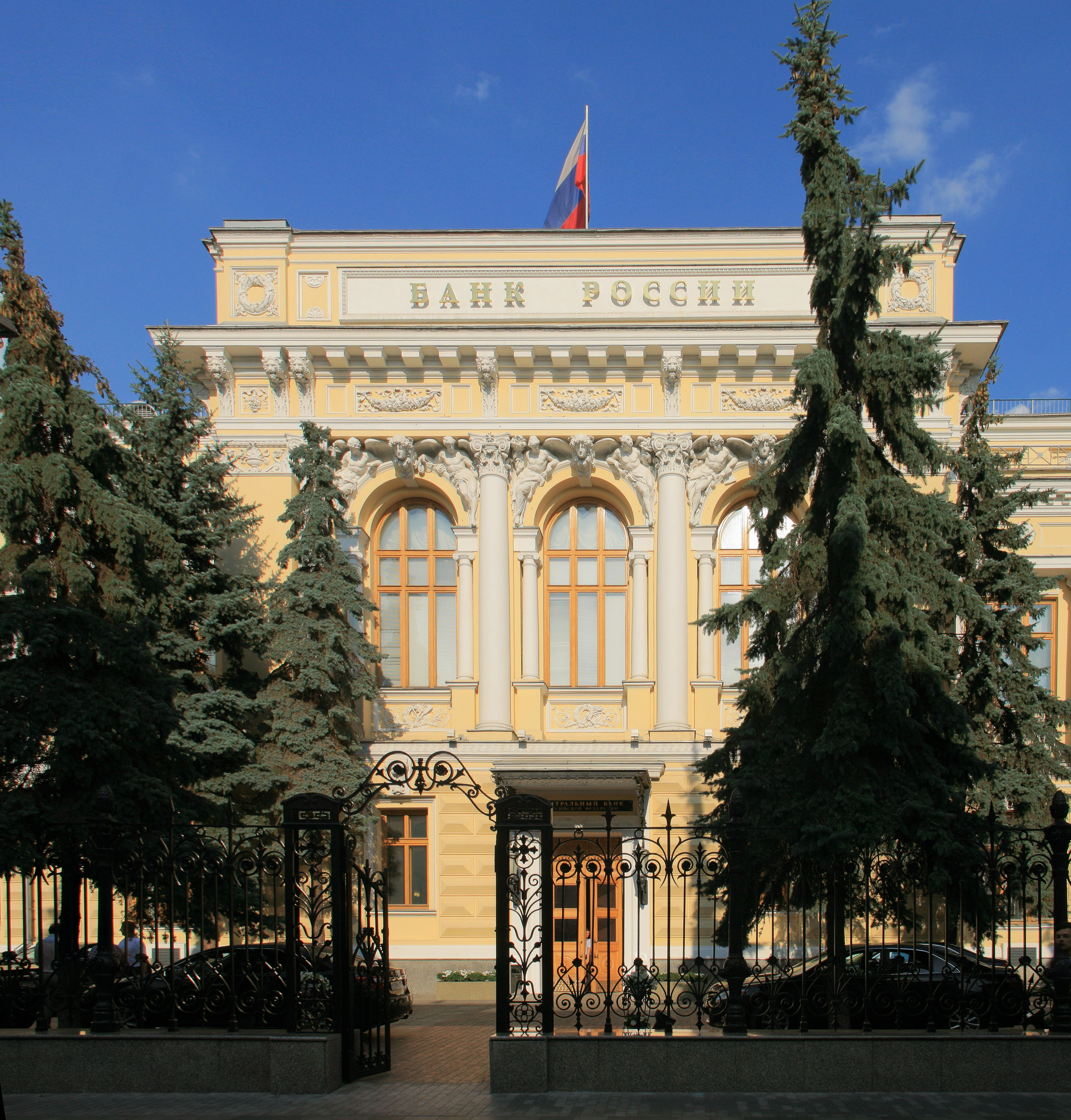
- Head office erected in 1894 as the Moscow branch of the State Bank of the Russian Empire
- Central bank of: Russia
- Headquarters: 12 Neglinnaya Street, Moscow, Russia
- Coordinates: 55°45′47″N 37°37′17″E
- Established: 1860; 166 years ago (original institution); 13 July 1990; 36 years ago (Bank of the RSFSR); 25 December 1991; 34 years ago (current name)
- Governor: Elvira Nabiullina
- Currency: Russian ruble RUB (ISO 4217)
- Reserves: US$387.1 billion (as of October 2025) (Note: The Russian CB formally continues to include the approx. $320 billion in assets frozen abroad in its reserves figure)
- Reserve requirements: International Reserves
- Bank rate: 14.00%
- Preceded by: State Bank of the USSR
- Website: cbr.ru/eng

The Central Bank of the Russian Federation (Russian: Центральный банк Российской Федерации), commonly known as the Bank of Russia (Russian: Банк России) or CB (Russian: ЦБ), also widely referred to as the Central Bank of Russia (CBR), is the central bank of the Russian Federation. The bank was established on 13 July 1990. It traces its beginnings to the State Bank of the Russian Empire established in 1860.

The bank is headquartered on Neglinnaya Street in Moscow. Its functions are described in the Constitution of Russia (Article 75), as well as in federal law.

== History ==
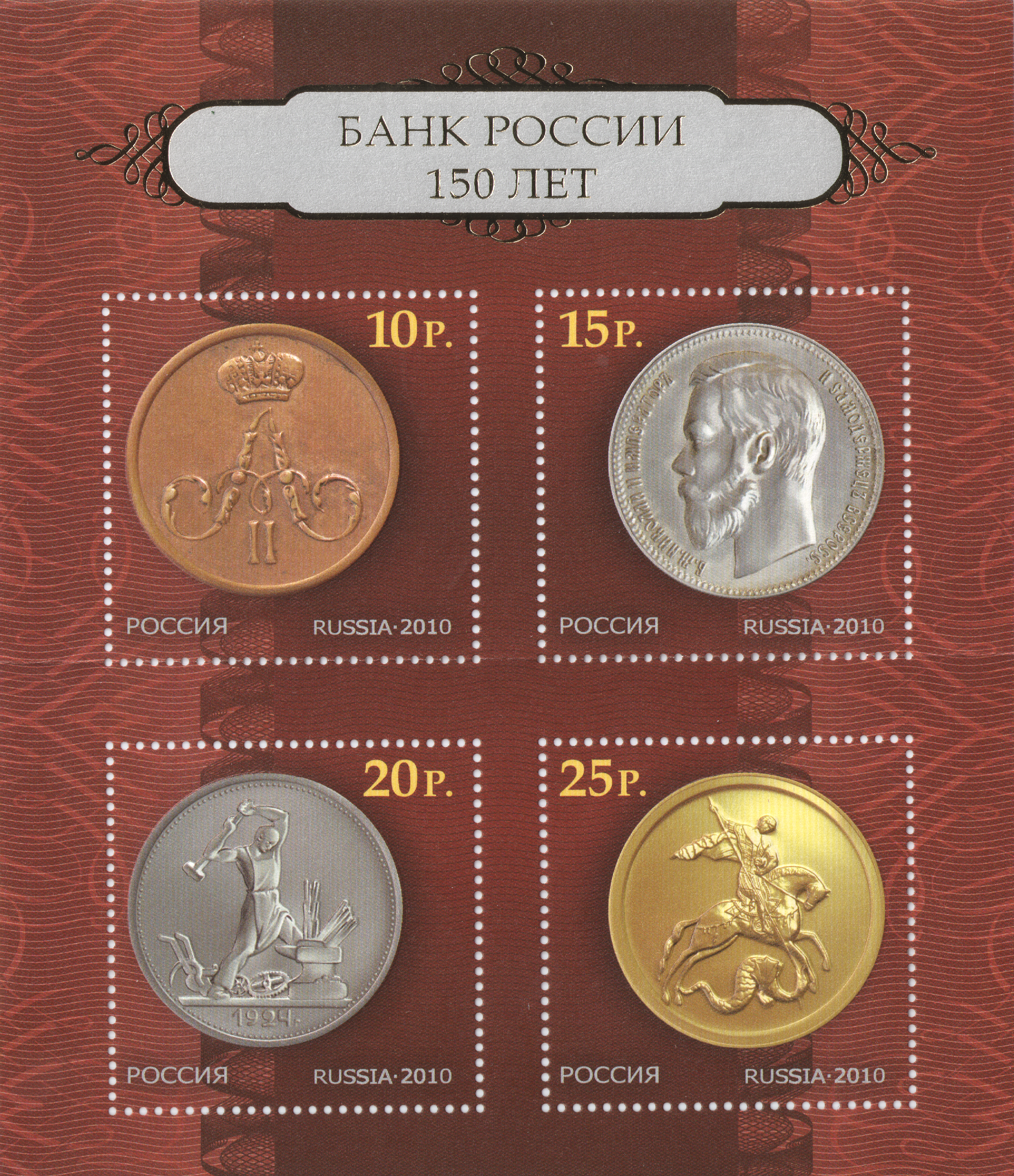
Russian postage stamp sheet in commemoration of 150-year anniversary of setting up of Bank of Russia

Shortly after declaring sovereignty in June 1990, the Russian SFSR decreed the creation of a central bank under the leadership of Georgy Matyukhin. Matyukhin commandeered Russian branches of the State Bank of the USSR and brought them under the control of the Bank of the RSFSR. A comprehensive central bank statute was passed in December 1990 and the bank adopted a charter in June 1991. A remnant of the State Bank continued to operate alongside it until it was dissolved along with the Soviet Union in December 1991, and the Bank of Russia assumed its remaining business.

Since 1992, the Bank of Russia began to buy and sell foreign currency on the foreign exchange market created by it, establish and publish the official exchange rates of foreign currencies against the ruble.

In 2006 capital controls mandate by the CBR began to ease, as confidence in the ruble mounted from the depths of the 1990s. Legislation continued to ease through the 2010s. The 2022 Russian invasion of Ukraine reversed this trend.

In August 2023 the CBR raised the primary interest rate from 8.5% to 12%. At the same time president Vladimir Putin was said to be considering capital controls on exporters from Russia, who would have to convert 80% of foreign funds to the ruble. This would be done in order artificially to increase demand for the domestic currency. In April 2024 this measure was prolonged for another year, from the original term of six months. It was reported that "43 major Russian commodities groups" were affected. At the time the ruble was trading at 93 to the US dollar.

In October 2023, Western firms that wanted to exit the Russian economy were doubly fleeced when they were told about extraordinary capital controls. On 15 July 2024 the CBRF closed the statistics of the over-the-counter currency market; at the time it was under pressure from international sanctions over the Russian invasion of Ukraine.

On 26 July 2024 the CBRF hiked its primary interest rate by 200 basis points to 18%. In 2024 Q2, core inflation increased to 9.2% in annualised terms and labour shortages continued to grow.

In September 2024 it was reported that the CBR had allowed the Rosoboronexport to buy US banknotes from the Rwandan Ministry of Defence while entities in Russia were interdicted from having US currency.

On 13 September 2024 the CBR raised its primary interest rate to 19%.

== Role and duties ==
According to the constitution, it is an independent entity, with the primary responsibility of protecting the stability of the national currency, the ruble.

Before 1 September 2013, it was the main regulator of the Russian banking industry, responsible for banking licenses, rules of banking operations and accounting standards, serving as a lender of last resort for credit organizations. After pointed date functions and powers of CBR were significantly expanded and the central bank received the status of a mega-regulator of all financial markets of Russia.

It holds the exclusive right to issue ruble banknotes and coins through the Moscow and St. Petersburg mints, and the Goznak mint. The central bank issues commemorative coins made of precious and non-precious metals as well as investment ones made of precious metals, which are distributed inside and outside the country. In 2010, in honor of its 150th anniversary it issued a 5-kilo commemorative gold coin Alexander II.

Under Russian law, half of the bank's profit must be channeled into the government's federal budget. The Central Bank of Russia is a member of the BIS.

The Bank of Russia owns a 57.58% stake in Sberbank, the country's leading commercial bank. The Bank of Russia also owns a 100% stake in Russian National Reinsurance Company (RNRC), the biggest national reinsurance company. The RNRC was established in July 2016 to prevent possible problems with reinsurance of large risks under international sanctions during the Russo-Ukrainian War, like constructing the Crimean Bridge.

The Bank of Russia is actively working on financial literacy of the population. In particular, the Fincult project is developing a website with materials aimed at improving financial literacy of the population, combating fraud through a description of all fraudulent schemes.

The Bank of Russia is also involved in working with citizens' pension savings. Pensions in Russia remain very low. For 2024, the minimum social pension is set at 13,269 rubles (147 US dollars). Since there is not enough money in the budget, citizens are offered to save for retirement on their own. To this end, since 2024, the Bank of Russia and all its regional divisions have been actively promoting the Long-term Savings Program developed by the Bank of Russia.

The main feature of the long–term savings program is co-financing by the state. That is, citizens who have joined the program will receive an increase in their savings from the state for a certain time. Thus, people can form additional capital for their priority goals in the future, for example, to buy a home or educate children, create a financial "safety cushion" or use this money as an increase to a pension, she said in an interview Bankiros.ru representative of the Central Bank of the Russian Federation Larisa Pavlova.

=== Anti-fraud activities ===
A key prospective witness in improper financial affairs was Lyubov Tarasova (Russian: Любовь Тарасова) who was a senior auditor for the Central Bank of Russia and worked for the "Unicom" (Russian: "Юникон") auditing firm which had been established on 20 August 1991 and was responsible for "checking the correctness of the documentation and the essence of business transactions that are in doubt" (Russian: "проверка правильности документального оформления и сущности хозяйственных операций, вызывающих сомнение"), but was stabbed to death in her apartment in Moscow on 15-16 October 1997.

In 2017, within the framework of a joint anti-phishing project of the Bank of Russia and search engine Yandex, a special check mark (a green circle with a tick and 'Реестр ЦБ РФ' (Bank of Russia Register) text box) appeared in the search results, informing the consumer that the website is really owned by a legally registered company licensed by the Bank of Russia.

== Governors ==
The President of the Board of Directors of the Central Bank is the head of the central banking system of the Russian Federation. The Governor is chosen by the President of Russia; and serves for four-year-terms after appointment. A Governor may be appointed for several consecutive terms (Sergey Ignatyev was the Governor of the Central Bank for 11 years, and he was appointed three times, in the longest serving term in post-soviet Russia).

№	Name (governor)	Photo	Term of office			Appointed by
№	Name (governor)	Photo	Start of term	End of term	Length of service	Appointed by
1	Georgy Matyukhin		25 December 1990	16 May 1992	1 year, 143 days (508 days)	Boris Yeltsin
2	Viktor Gerashchenko		17 July 1992	18 October 1994	2 years, 93 days (823 days)	Boris Yeltsin
3	Tatyana Paramonova		19 October 1994	8 November 1995	1 year, 20 days (385 days)	Boris Yeltsin
4	Alexander Khandruyev		8 November 1995	22 November 1995	14 days (14 days)	Boris Yeltsin
5	Sergey Dubinin		22 November 1995	11 September 1998	2 years, 293 days (1,024 days)	Boris Yeltsin
6	Viktor Gerashchenko		11 September 1998	20 March 2002	3 years, 190 days (1,286 days)	Boris Yeltsin
7	Sergey Ignatyev		21 March 2002	23 June 2013	11 years, 94 days (4,112 days)	Vladimir Putin
8	Elvira Nabiullina		24 June 2013	present	13 years, 107 days (4,855 days)	Vladimir Putin

== Subsidiaries ==
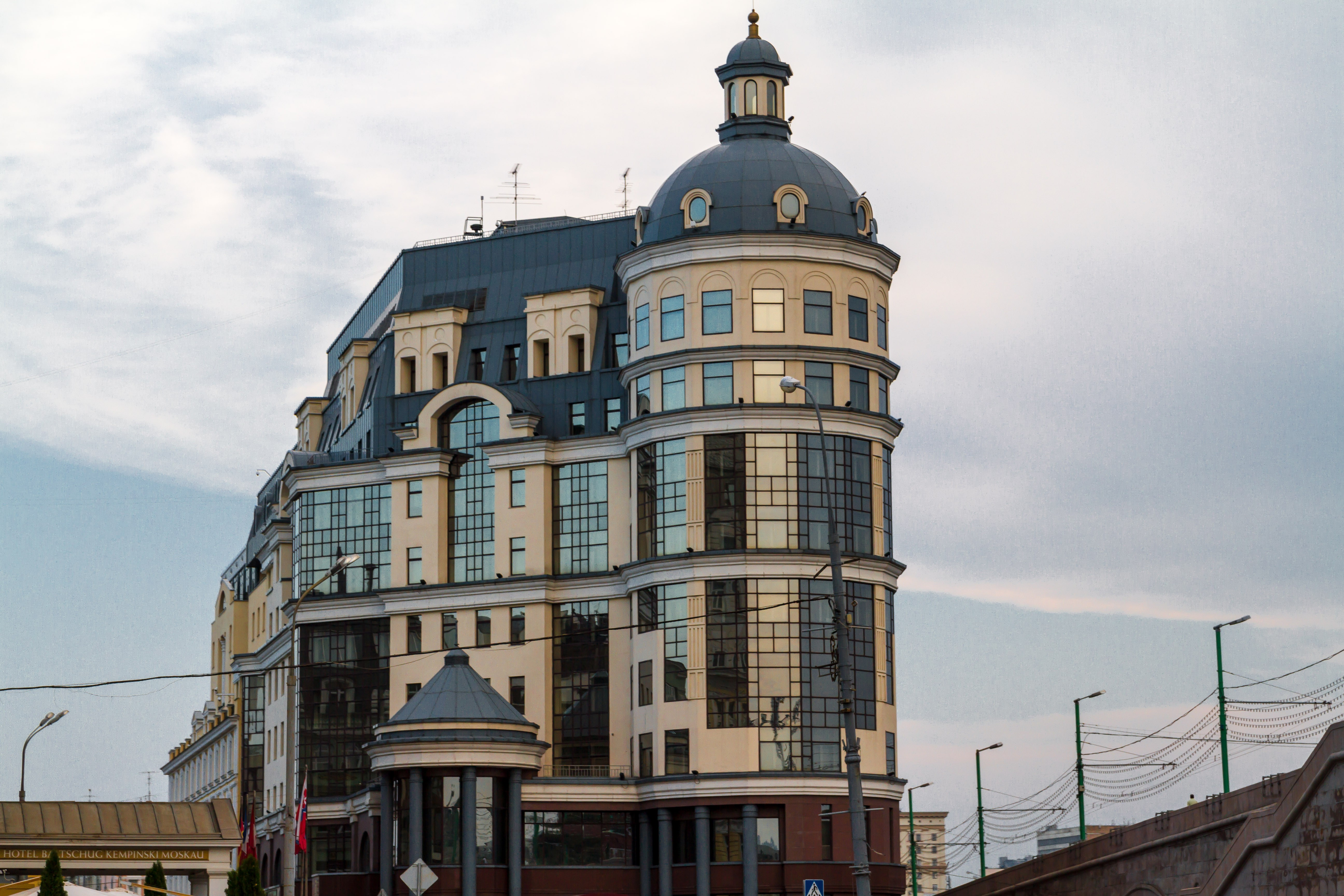
Main Directorate of the Bank of Russia for the Central Federal District

The Central Bank of Russia holds directly significant participatory interests in a number of Russian companies:

- Sberbank of Russia (50%+1 voting share of the stock);
- Moscow Exchange (11.779% of the stock);
- Russian National Reinsurance Company (100% of the stock);
- Trust company of the Banking Sector Consolidation Fund (100% of the stock);
- Rosincas (Russian Association of Cash-in-transit).

Additionally, the Bank of Russia held earlier interests in some other Russian organizations. In particular, after the liquidation of Gosbank (State Bank of the USSR), the CBR beneficially acquired complete or controlling interests in five so-called "Russian Foreign Banks" (until 1991 – "Soviet Foreign Banks"):

- VTB Bank (99.99% of the stock – until 2002, now - 60.9% owned by The Federal Agency for State Property Management (Rosimushchestvo) );
- Donau Bank AG, Vienna;
- East-West United Bank, Luxemburg;
- Eurobank, Paris;
- Moscow Narodny Bank, London;
- Ost-West Handelsbank, Frankfurt am Main.

All of them were members of the USSR Vnesheconombank system and were transferred to the CBR in 1992 by the Resolution of the Presidium of the Supreme Soviet of Russia. For over five years – 2000 to 2005 – all stocks of the Russian Foreign Banks were being purchased from the Bank of Russia by VTB Bank. (Note: In 1998, "Northern Alliance" (Russian: «Северный Альянс») associated with Saint Petersburg included directors and shareholders of Tokobank (Russian: Токобанк) including Sudhir Gupta, owner of Amtel Tire Holding and controlled Yunicbank (Russian: Юникбанк), whose August 1998 head of the supervisory board was Stepan Kovalchuk (Russian: Степан Ковальчук), the chairman of the board of Flamingo Bank (Russian: банк «Фламинг»). Stepan Kovalchuk is a grand-nephew of Yuri Kovalchuk.) As part of the financial support to credit institutions, the Bank of Russia invests in them through the Banking Sector Consolidation Fund and acquires (on a temporary and indirect basis) shares in the equity of such banks. The first project of this kind was Otkritie FC Bank, in summer 2017.

== Policies ==
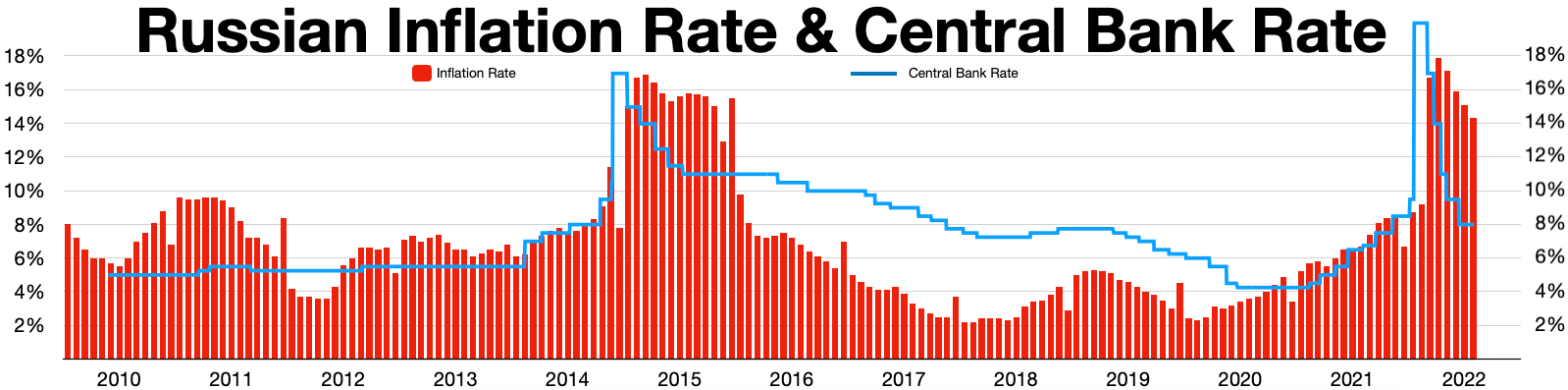
Russian inflation rate Central Bank of Russia key interest rate

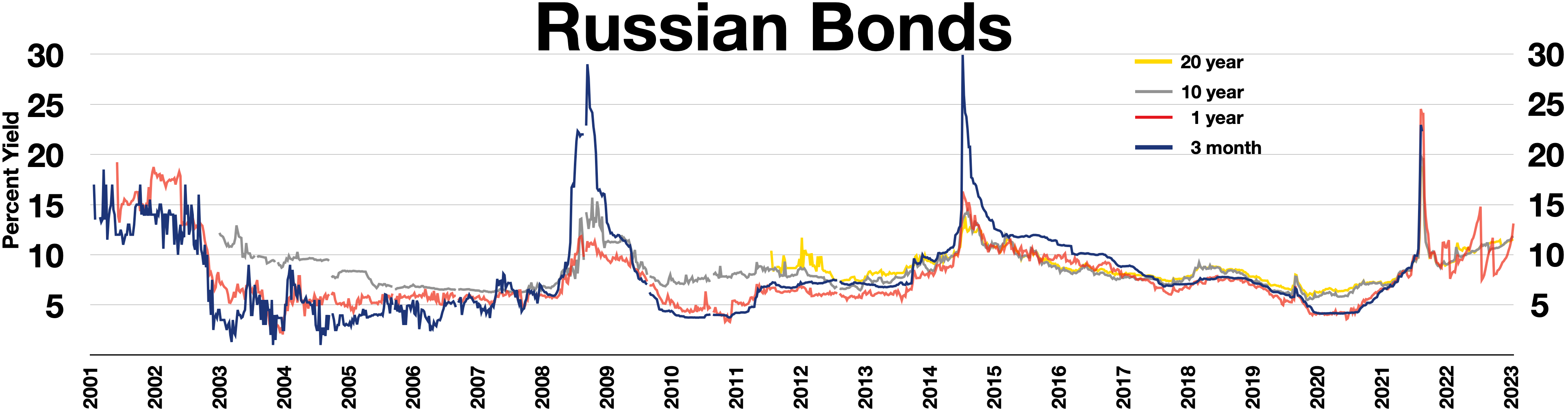
Russian bonds, inverted yield curves to tame inflation during their wars (Russo-Georgian War, Russo-Ukrainian War, 2022 Russian invasion of Ukraine) 20 year bond 10 year bond 1 year bond 3 month bond

In December 2014, amidst falling global oil prices, international sanctions during the Russo-Ukrainian War, capital flight, and fears of recession, the bank had increased the one-week minimum auction repo rate up by 6.5 points to 17 percent. This caused a run on the ruble, and on 29 January, the bank decreased the rate by two points to 15 percent.

In January 2015, the head of monetary policy, Ksenia Yudayeva, a proponent of strict anti-inflation policy, was replaced by Dmitry Tulin, who is "seen as more acceptable to bankers, who have called for lower interest rates".

In response to the 2021–2022 Russo-Ukrainian crisis, multiple countries imposed economic sanctions against Russian banks. On 22 February 2022, US president Joe Biden announced restrictions of activities by US citizens involved with the Bank of Russia and others. In March, the Bank of International Settlements suspended the Bank of Russia. In March 2022, the Depository Trust & Clearing Corporation blocked Russian securities from the Bank of Russia and Russia's finance ministry. At the end of May 2022, three months into the invasion of Ukraine, the central bank cut interest rates in an effort to prop up the increasingly isolated Russian economy, suffering shortages and supply chain issues. The inflation rate rose to 17.8 percent in April. Also the ruble reached its strongest level against the U.S. dollar in four years, hurting exports. The central bank announced a possible rate cut in 2025 due to stabilising inflation on the 1000th day of the Ukraine war. In September 2025 the Central Bank lowered the interest rate from 18 percent to 17 percent, as part of its post war recovery monetary policy.

Sanctions also included asset freezes on the Russian Central Bank, which holds $630 billion in foreign-exchange reserves, to prevent it from offsetting the impact of sanctions. On 5 May 2022, President of the European Council Charles Michel said: "I am absolutely convinced that this is extremely important not only to freeze assets but also to make possible to confiscate it, to make it available for the rebuilding" of Ukraine.

In December 2025, international media reported that France refused to allow approximately $19.4 billion in frozen CBR assets held at commercial banks to be used in a proposed EU loan for Ukraine.

== See also ==
- Banking in Russia
- Economy of Russia
- Gosbank
- Goznak
- International Financial Congress
- International Reserves of the Russian Federation
- Andrey Kozlov
- National Foreign Exchange Association
- Russian National Card Payment System
- List of financial supervisory authorities by country
- List of central banks
- National Association of Securities Market Participants
