= Mikhail Ignatyev =

Mikhail Ignatyev may refer to:

- Mikhail Ignatyev (politician), second president of the Chuvash Republic, Russia
- Mikhail Ignatiev (cyclist), Russian track and road bicycle racer

== See also ==
- Michael Ignatieff, Canadian politician
