= Sergey Dubinin =

Russian economist and politician (1950–2025)

- Сергей Дубинин
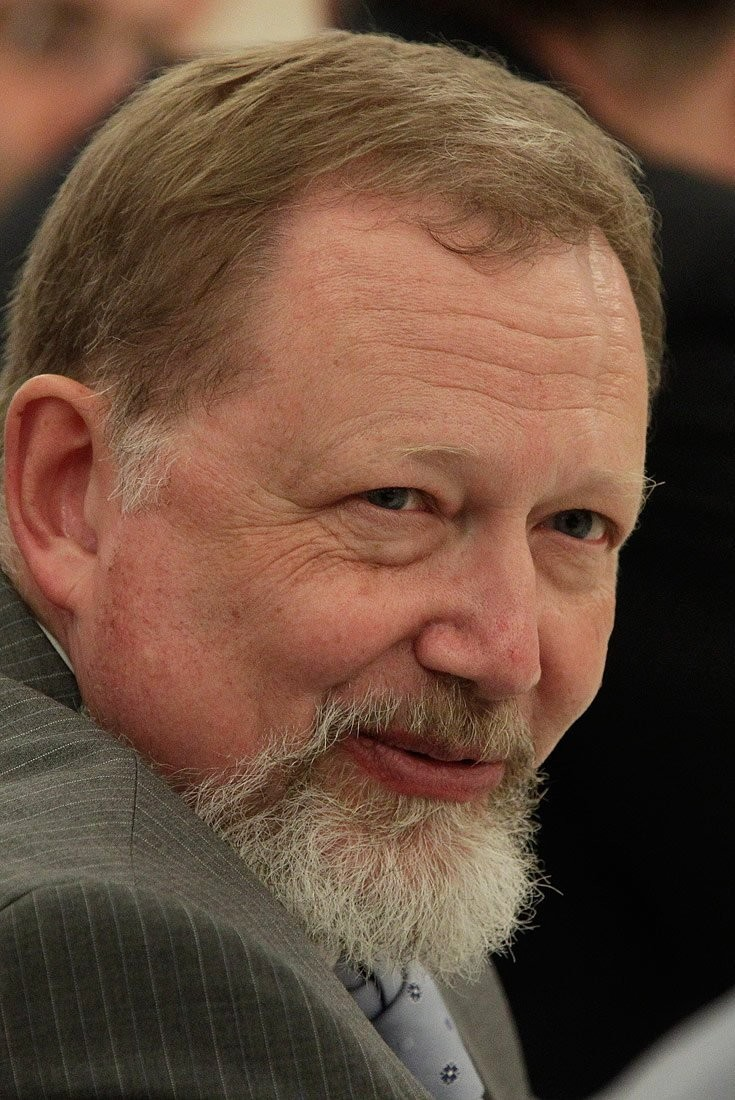
- Dubinin in 2011

Governor of the Central Bank of Russia
- In office 22 November 1995 – 11 September 1998
- President: Boris Yeltsin
- Prime Minister: Viktor Chernomyrdin; Sergey Kiriyenko; Viktor Chernomyrdin (acting)
- Preceded by: Viktor Gerashchenko; Alexander Khandruev (acting)
- Succeeded by: Viktor Gerashchenko

Acting Minister of Finance of Russia
- In office 26 January 1994 – 12 October 1994
- President: Boris Yeltsin
- Prime Minister: Viktor Chernomyrdin
- Preceded by: Boris Fedorov
- Succeeded by: Andrey Vavilov (acting); Vladimir Panskov

Personal details
- Born: 10 December 1950 Moscow, Russian SFSR, Soviet Union
- Died: 4 December 2025 (aged 74) Moscow, Russia
- Education: Moscow State University (Faculty of Economics)
- Profession: Economist
- Awards: Medal "In Commemoration of the 850th Anniversary of Moscow"; Certificate of Honor of the Government of the Russian Federation

Sergey Konstantinovich Dubinin (Russian: Серге́й Константи́нович Дуби́нин; 10 December 1950 – 4 December 2025) was a Russian economist and politician. He was minister of finance in 1994 and governor of the Central Bank of Russia from 1995 to 1998. Dubinin died on 4 December 2025, at the age of 74.
