= Aleksei Ignatiev =

Russian politician

Alexei Ignatiev
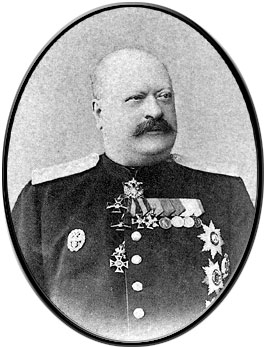

6th General-Governor of Eastern Siberia

Count
- In office 1885–1889
- Preceded by: Dmitriy Anuchin

General-Governor of Kiev, Podolsk and Volyn
- In office 1889–1896

Personal details
- Born: May 22, 1842
- Died: December 9, 1906 (aged 64) Tver
- Spouse: Countess Sophia Ignatyeva
- Children: Count Alexey Ignatyev; Count Pavel Ignatyev; Olga Ignatyeva; Sergey Ignatyev

Count Alexei Pavlovich Ignatiev (Russian: Алексе́й Па́влович Игна́тьев) was a Russian political figure. His brother Nicholas Pavlovich Ignatiev was Chairman of the Committee of Ministers between 1872 and 1880.

On December 14, 1905, the New York Times reported rumors, circulating in St. Petersburg, that he was arrested on suspicion of fomenting rebellion against the czar.

Ignatiev was shot to death by members of the Socialist-Revolutionary Party in 1906.

== Main military offices ==
- Commander of the 2nd Her Majesty Courland Leib Uhlan Regiment (from 1871)
- Commander of the 1st Brigade of the 1st Cavalry Guards Division (from 1874)
- Major-General (from 1875)
- Head of the Guards Corps Staff (from 1881)
- Cavalry General (from 1896)
