= Sergey Ignatyev (economist) =

Russian economist, banker, and official (born 1948)

- Сергей Игнатьев
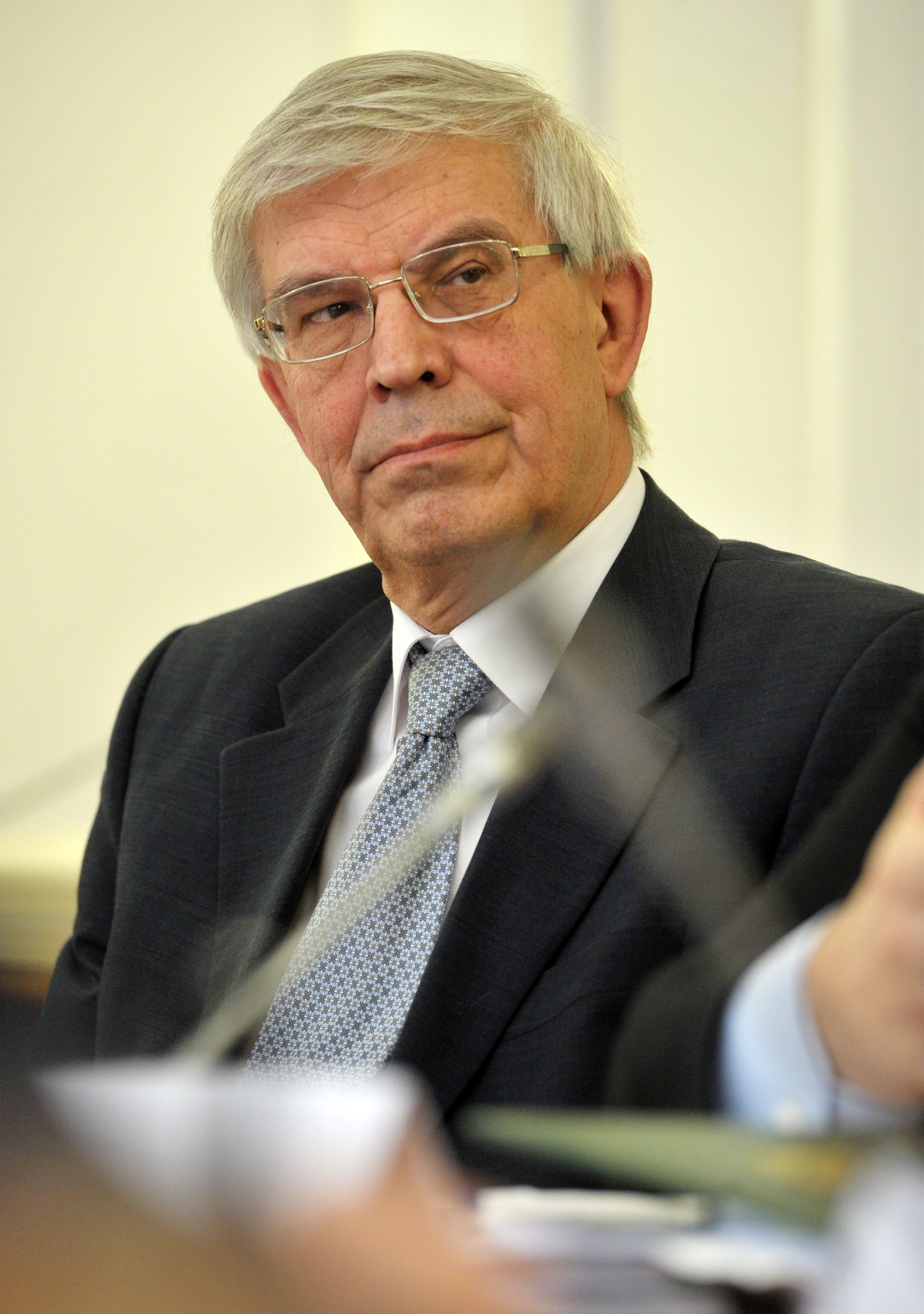
- Ignatyev in 2011

Governor of the Central Bank of Russia
- In office 20 March 2002 – 24 June 2013
- Preceded by: Viktor Gerashchenko
- Succeeded by: Elvira Nabiullina

Deputy Minister of Finance
- In office 1997 – March 2002
- President: Boris Yeltsin; Vladimir Putin
- Prime Minister: Viktor Chernomyrdin; Sergey Kiriyenko; Yevgeny Primakov; Sergey Stepashin; Vladimir Putin; Mikhail Kasyanov

Personal details
- Born: 10 January 1948 (age 78) Leningrad, Soviet Union (now Saint Petersburg, Russia)
- Education: Moscow State University

Sergey Mikhaylovich Ignatyev (Russian: Серге́й Михайлович Игнатьев; born January 10, 1948) is a Russian economist, banker, and official. Since 2013 to 2022 - Advisor to the Governor of the Central Bank of the Russian Federation. Since 2002 to 2013 - Governor of the Central Bank of the Russian Federation. Since 1997 to 2002 - First Deputy Minister of Finance of the Russian Federation, from 1993 to 1996 - Deputy Minister of Economy of the Russian Federation. Since 1992 to 1993 - Deputy Governor of the Central Bank of Russia, from 1991 to 1992 - Deputy Minister of Economy and Finance of the Russian Federation. He has the federal state civilian service rank of 1st class Active State Councillor of the Russian Federation.

== First Deputy Finance Minister of Russia ==
From September 13, 1996, to April 5, 1997, he was an aide to President Boris Yeltsin for economy. From April 1997 – March 2002, he worked as a First Deputy Finance Minister of Russia.

== Governor of Central Bank of Russia ==
From March 20, 2002, to June 24, 2013 he was the Governor of the Central Bank of the Russian Federation and was replaced by Elvira Nabiullina.

His deputy in charge of bank supervision, Andrei Kozlov was shot dead on 14 September 2006 after he revealed an enormous illegal money laundering scheme.

Kozlov was replaced by Gennady Melikyan as deputy governor of the central bank in charge of bank supervision but resigned in September 2011.

=== 2012 illegal money laundering in Russia ===
On 20 February 2013, Ignatyev stated that $49 billion associated with illegal one day networks of shell companies, which were controlled by one group of people, with capital outflows from Russia, which were equivalent to 2.5% of Russia's gross domestic product (GDP), had occurred during 2012.

== Sberbank ==
In February 2022, Sergey Ignatyev left the supervisory board of Sberbank.

Political offices
Preceded by Viktor Gerashchenko	Governor of the Central Bank of Russia; March 20, 2002– June 24, 2013	Succeeded by Elvira Nabiullina
