= Viktor Gerashchenko =

Soviet and Russian central banker (1937–2025)

- Виктор Геращенко
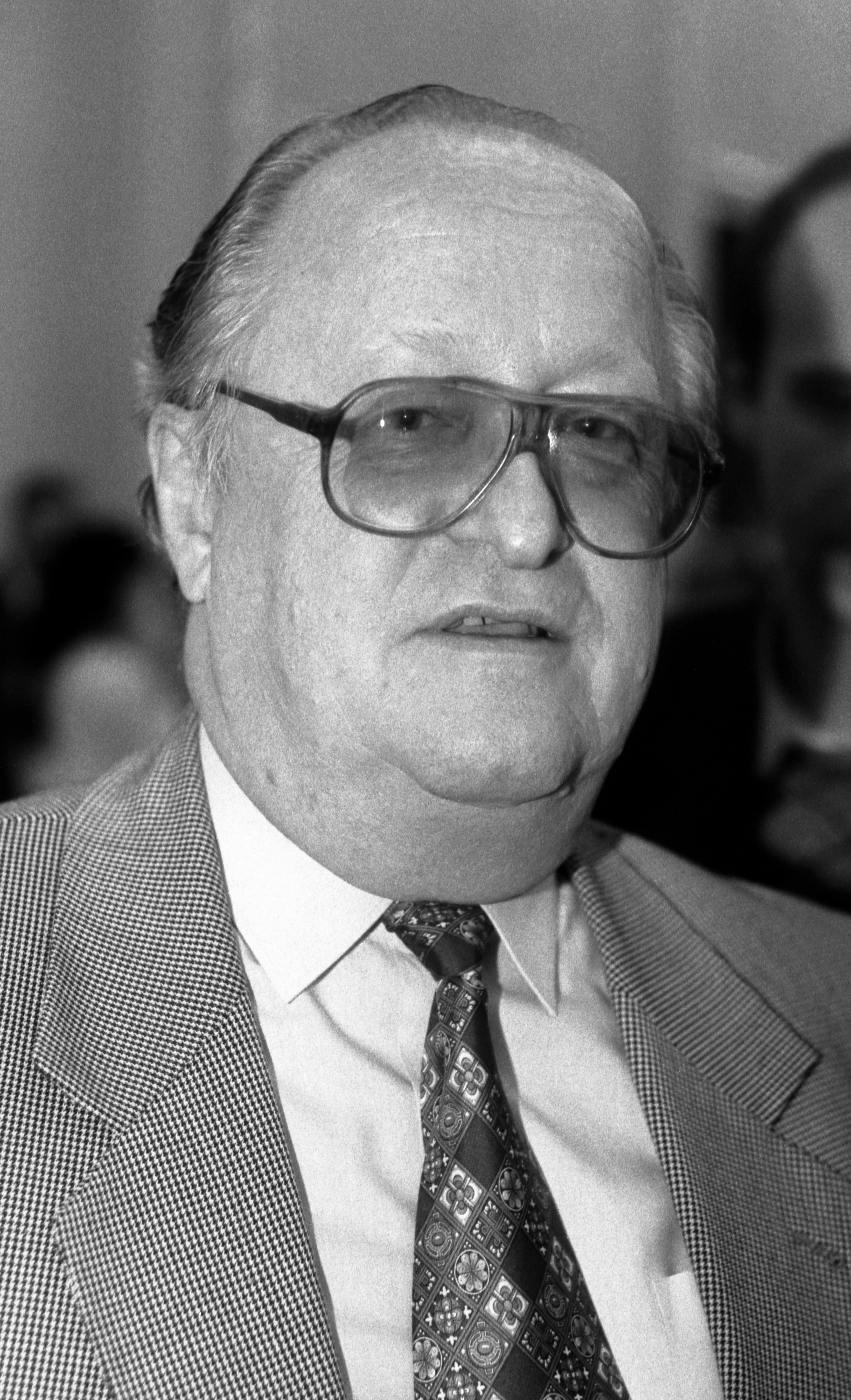
- Gerashchenko in 1994

Governor of the Central Bank of Russia
- In office 11 September 1998 – 20 March 2002
- Preceded by: Sergey Dubinin
- Succeeded by: Sergey Ignatyev
- In office 4 November 1992 – 18 October 1994
- Preceded by: Georgy Matyukhin
- Succeeded by: Tatyana Paramonova (acting); Sergey Dubinin

Governor of the USSR State Bank
- In office 3 August 1989 – 26 December 1991
- Preceded by: Nikolay Garetovsky
- Succeeded by: Office disestablished

Member of the State Duma
- In office 2003–2007

Personal details
- Born: 21 December 1937 Leningrad, Russian SFSR, Soviet Union
- Died: 11 May 2025 (aged 87) Moscow, Russia
- Party: Rodina
- Other political affiliations: Communist Party of the Soviet Union (1963–1991)
- Education: Moscow Finance Institute
- Awards: Order of the Red Banner of Labour; Order of Friendship of Peoples; Order of Honour; Order "For Merit to the Fatherland" 3rd, 4th class

Viktor Vladimirovich Gerashchenko (Russian: Виктор Владимирович Геращенко; 21 December 1937 – 11 May 2025), nicknamed Heracles (Russian: Геракл), was a Soviet and Russian economist and banker who served as the Governor of the State Bank of the USSR, then Governor of the Bank of Russia during much of the Perestroika and post-Perestroika periods.

== Life and career ==
Viktor Gerashchenko was born in Leningrad on 21 December 1937. His father was a leading Soviet banker who ran the Financial Department of the Foreign Office in the 1940s before ending his career as deputy governor of the State Bank. Due to his father's connections, Viktor made a brilliant career in the Soviet banking system. At the age of 28 he became director of the Soviet-controlled Moscow Narodny Bank in London.

In 1982, Gerashcheko moved to work in the Vneshtorgbank, responsible for Soviet foreign trade. Seven years later he was appointed governor of the Board of the USSR State Bank. In 1989, Gerashchenko became the last governor of the State Bank of the USSR. For three years, which proved to be some of the most difficult for Russian national economics, he steered the nascent banking system as governor of the Bank of Russia.

For approximately seven years during the 1990s, the Kremlin's obshchak («общак») or black cash was stored in the vaults of Vnesheconombank (VEB) because Gerashchenko stated that in 1992 VEB became an agency for the return of the state debt of the USSR due to a decree by the Supreme Soviet: "Vnesheconombank does not have a central banking license. It does not need it, since it does not conduct any commercial operations." He also added, "Due to the lack of a license, this is the only Russian bank that the Central Bank does not check – it does not have the right."

His activities as Central Bank governor were controversial: for example, he was accused of illegally supplying money to the anti-reform forces in the Supreme Soviet during the 1993 Russian Constitutional Crisis. Gerashchenko was also accused of being largely responsible for the Russian "Black Tuesday" of October 1994, when the Russian ruble crashed 24 percent in one day. Former Harvard economist Jeffrey Sachs in 1995 called Gerashchenko "the worst central banker in the world."

Gerashchenko resigned in 1994, but returned to the office following the 1998 Russian financial crisis. Under his leadership, the economy of Russia rapidly recovered after the excruciating default. Gerashchenko made frequent TV appearances and became quite popular for his sardonic, dry sense of humor.

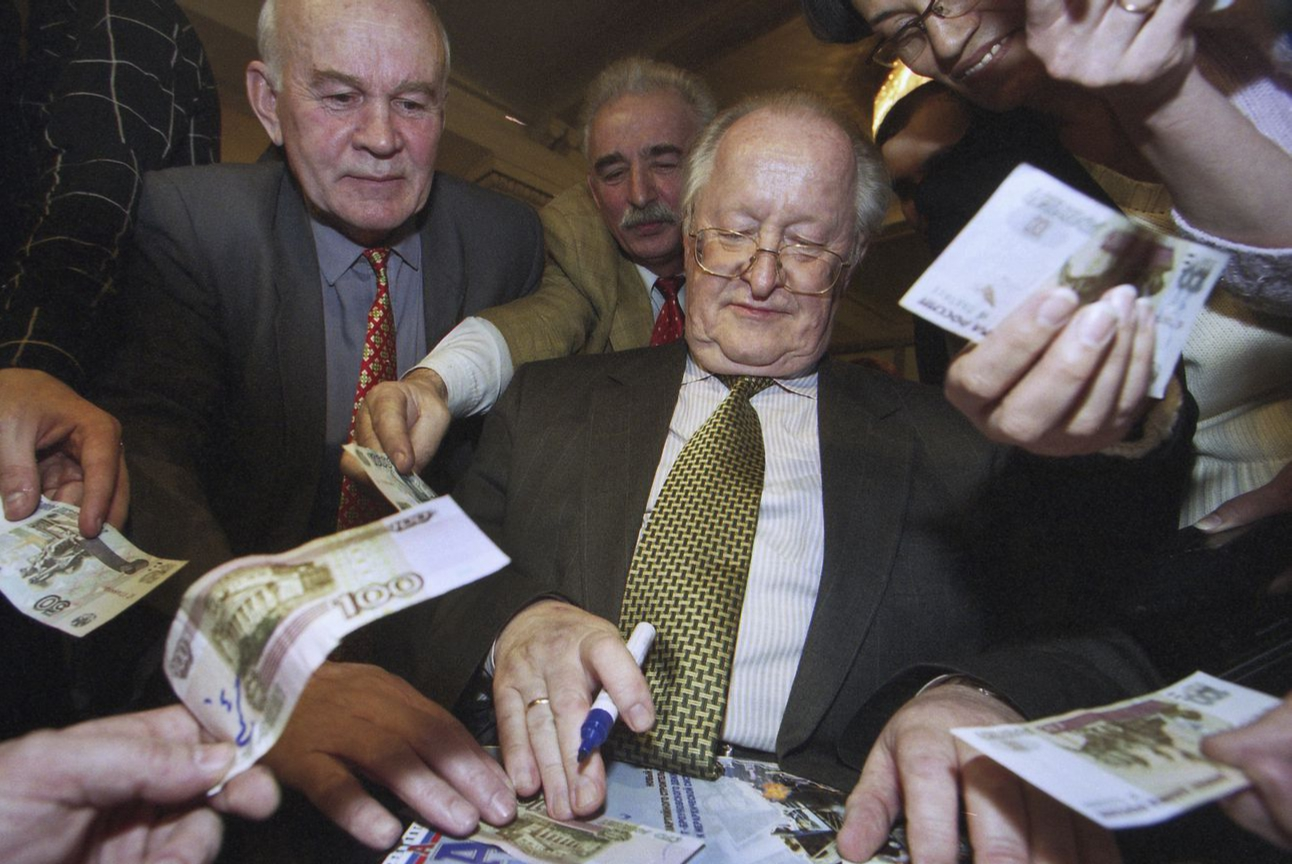
Gerashchenko signing rouble banknotes after resigning from the Central Bank Governor's office

In March 2002, Gerashchenko resigned again, citing his advanced age, and accepted the post of chairman of the board in the notorious oil company Yukos. He then joined the Rodina party as a co-chairman and made it to the State Duma as their representative.

Gerashchenko died following a severe and prolonged illness on 11 May 2025, at the age of 87.

== Presidential candidacies ==
=== 2004 ===
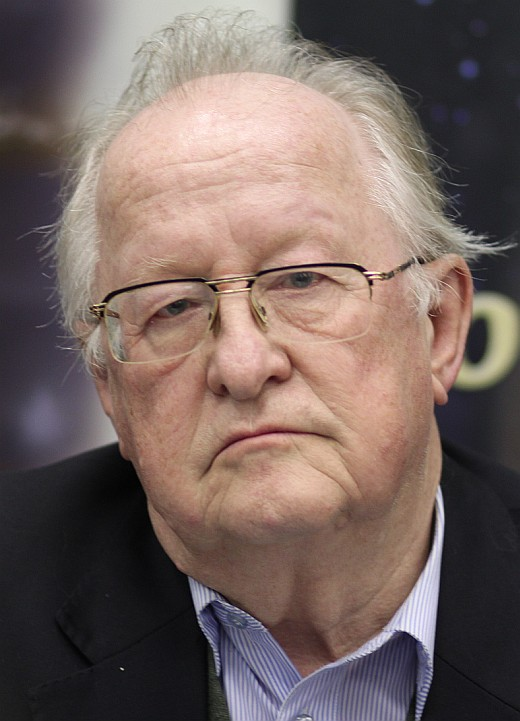
Gerashchenko in 2010

Gerashchenko ran in the 2004 Russian presidential election.

He was originally believed to have been acting as a back-up candidate to Rodina leader Sergey Glazyev, in case something were to prevent Glazyev from running. However, a divide between Glazyev and Geraschchenko became apparent when Rodina nominated Geraschchenko for president instead of Glazyev.

Geraschenko was ultimately refused registration by the Central Election Commission due to a technicality. The Supreme Court upheld his disqualification.

=== 2008 ===
Four years later, he considered running as an opposition candidate in the 2008 Russian Presidential election.

== Honours and awards ==
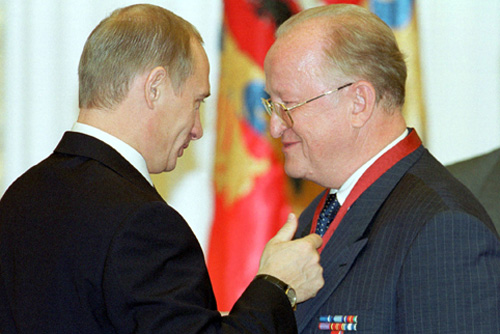
Gerashchenko receiving Order "For Merit to the Fatherland", 4th class, from President Vladimir Putin

- Order "For Merit to the Fatherland", 3rd class
- Order "For Merit to the Fatherland", 4th class
- Order of Honour
- Order of the Red Banner of Labour
- Order of Friendship of Peoples
- Medal "For Labour Valour"
- Jubilee Medal "In Commemoration of the 100th Anniversary of the Birth of Vladimir Ilyich Lenin"
- Jubilee Medal "300 Years of the Russian Navy"
- Medal "In Commemoration of the 850th Anniversary of Moscow"
