= Countess Sophia Ignatieva =

Countess Sophia Ignatyeva
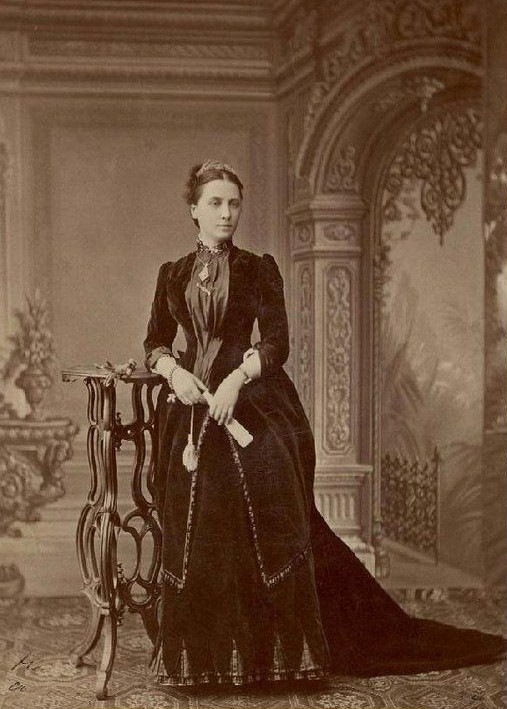
- Born: 1850
- Died: 1944 (aged 93–94); Paris
- Spouse: Count Alexey Ignatyev
- Parent(s): Maria Apraksina, Sergey Meshcherskiy

Countess Sophia Sergeyevna Ignatieva (Russian: Софи́я Серге́евна Игна́тьева; born in St Petersburg as Princess Meshcherskaya (княжна́ Меще́рская) 15 February 1851 — 18 February 1944 Paris, France) was Russian noblewoman, court lady and a socialite.

== Biography ==
Born into an old noble House of Meshchersky, she was the child of Prince Vladimir Meshchersky's first cousin, Prince Sergei Vasilievich Meshchersky (1828—1856) by his wife, Countess Maria Alexandrovna Apraxina (1827-1886). She was married to Count Alexei Pavlovich Ignatiev (1842-1906), a General in the Imperial Russian Army and member of the noble Ignatyev family. Sophia Sergeyevna owned eight houses in St Petersburg and was a landowner of Rzhev uyezd. Playing an important role in clerical circles, she reportedly was an adherent of Bishop Hermogenes and priest Heliodorus, first friends later opponents of Grigori Rasputin. Countess Sophia Ignatieva introduced Rasputin to Milica of Montenegro and her sister Anastasia, who were interested in Persian mysticism, spiritism, and occultism. She lived to be 94 years old and died on 28 February 1944 in Paris, France.
