= Dmitri Lebedev (businessman) =

Russian financier (born 1968)

- Born: Dmitri Alexeyevich Lebedev; 30 March 1968 (age 56); Leningrad, Soviet Union (now St Petersburg, Russia)

Dmitri Alekseevich Lebedev (Russian: Дмитрий Алексеевич Лебедев; born March 30, 1968) is a Russian financier.

== Education ==
Mr Lebedev graduated from the Leningrad Financial and Economic Institute (LFEI) majoring in economics in 1992 and received his master's degree in economics from LFEI in 1997.

== Career ==
In 1988, Mr Lebedev began his career as an economist at the Leningrad regional administration of Promstroybank in the Soviet Union. From 1990 to 1993, Mr Lebedev worked at the Central Administration of the Central Bank of Russia in St. Petersburg. From 1993 to 1995, Mr Lebedev was both a director of the Bank Rossiya in its St. Petersburg branch and, from 1994 to 1995, the first deputy chairman of the board of the CAB "Viking", where Alexey Ustaev was the chairman of the board. Later, Mr Lebedev returned to the Central Directorate of the Central Bank for St. Petersburg, where during 1996 – 2000 he was overseeing the technology department. Mr Lebedev served as the deputy chairman (April 2000 to September 2001) and later as the chairman of the board (September 2001 to November 2003) at JSCB "MENATEP - St. Petersburg". In October 2003 at the investment bank Trust, Mr Lebedev served on the board of directors. He advised Yuri Kraskovsky, the president of Transcreditbank, from April to August 2004. In December 2004, he was the director at the Center for Strategic Research – North-West Foundation and from January 2005 until April 2006, he was the director at the Center for Strategic Research (CSR) "North-West".

=== Bank Rossiya ===
From April 3, 2006 to June 2012, Mr Lebedev was the CEO of Bank Rossiya replacing Mikhail Klishin, who became the first deputy chairman of the board. In June 2012, Evgeny Logovinsky took over Lebedev's post as CEO. From June 2012 to June 2023, Mr Lebedev was the chairman of the board of directors of Bank Rossiya. He was a member of the Board of Directors of Tele2, which is part of the "T2 RTK Holding" LLC. Mr Lebedev was also the managing director of CJSC "ABR Management" which oversees the strategic management of Bank Rossiya.

== Sanctions ==
On December 20, 2016, the US Treasury Department sanctioned Lebedev pursuant to EO 13661 for providing support to senior officials of the Russian Federation. In March 2022, following Russia's invasion of Ukraine, the British government imposed sanctions on Lebedev which included freezing his assets and a travel ban.

== See also ==
- List of people and organizations sanctioned during the Russo-Ukrainian War
