= Victor Halansky =

Russian economist

Victor P. Halansky
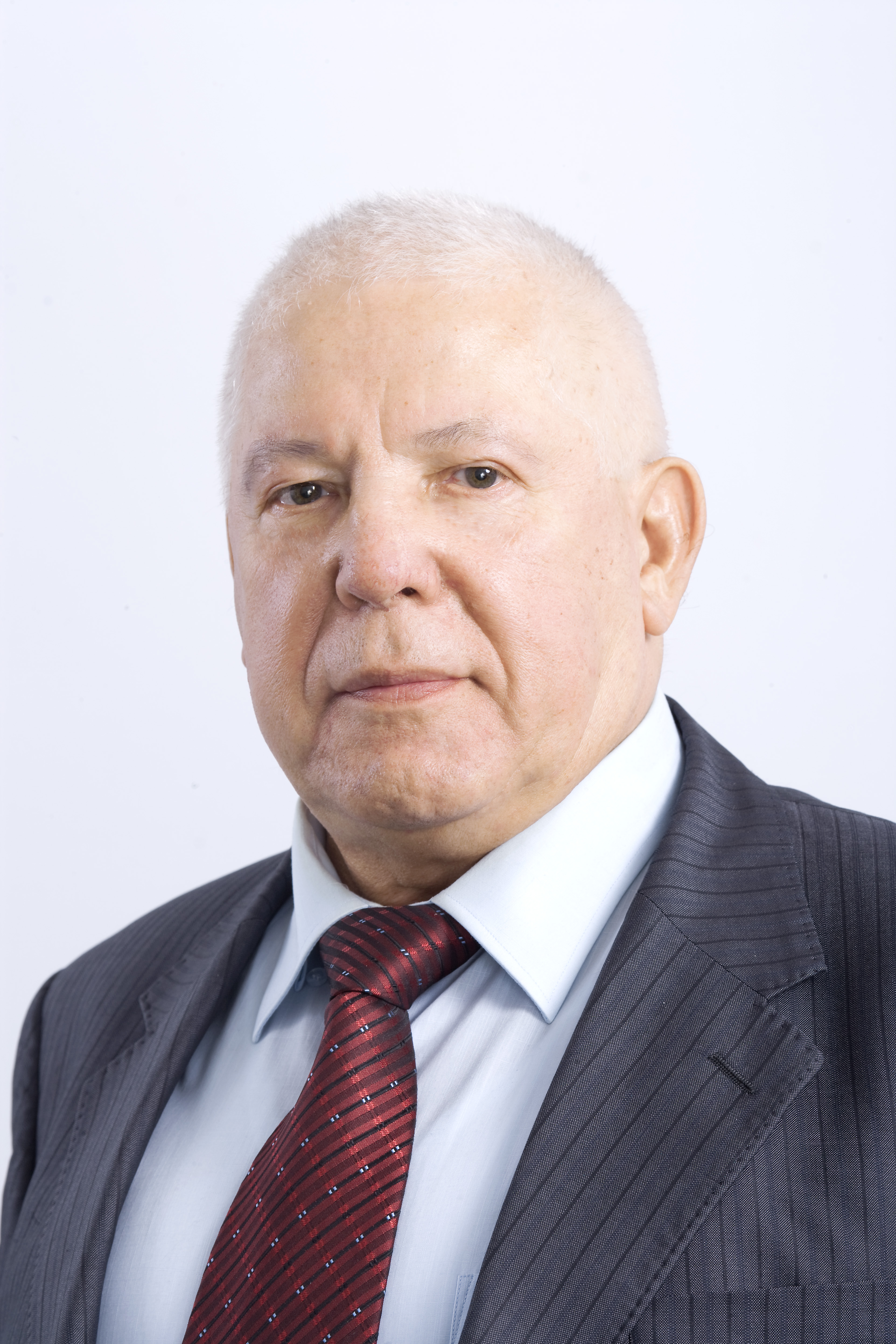
- Born: 4 August 1937 (age 88)
- Education: Professor of Higher Attestation Commission
- Occupation: Chairman of the Board of Directors of Viking Bank
- Website: http://www.vikingbank.ru/

Victor Halansky (born 1937) is a Russian economist. He was an executive manager in the Bureau of the State Bank of the USSR in Leningrad, and from 1990 to 1996 he was chief officer of the Main Department of the Central Bank of the Russian Federation in Saint Petersburg. Since 2003, he has been director of the Saint Petersburg Banking School of the Bank of Russia. Since 2000, he has been chairman of the board of directors of Viking Bank.

== Education ==
He studied at Leningrad University of Engineering and Economics. He holds a degree in economics and has been a professor certified by VAK, the Higher Attestation Commission, in the Department of Currency Circulation and Credit since 1995. He also studied at the Academy of National Economy in 1976.

== Biography ==
Victor Halansky was born on 4 August 1937 in Shostka, a town in Sumy Oblast. He graduated from the Economics Faculty of Shostka College of Chemistry and Technology in 1955 and from the Machine-Building Faculty of Saint Petersburg State University of Engineering and Economics in 1960. He holds a degree in economics and the title of professor. From 1960 to 1978, he worked his way up from shop foreman to deputy general director at the Industrial Association Power Machines ("Elektrosila"). From 1966 to 1969, he served as chief economic and planning expert at a heavy engineering plant in Haridwar. From 1978 to 1981, he was head of the Machine-Building and Heavy Engineering Industry Department of the Planning Commission of Lengorispolkom. From 1981 to 1985, he was deputy head of the Economy Department of the Leningrad regional commission of the CPSU. From 1985 to 1987, he was executive manager of the Bureau of Gosbank in Leningrad. From 1987 to 1988, he was chief officer of Promstroybank in Leningrad and the Leningrad region. From 1988 to 1990, he was deputy chairman of Promstroybank. From 1990 to 1996, he was chief officer of the Main Department of the Central Bank of the Russian Federation in Saint Petersburg. From 1996 to 1997, he was a counsellor in the Main Department of the Central Bank of the Russian Federation in Saint Petersburg. Since September 1997, he has been first deputy chairman of the management board of Viking Bank. Since 2000, he has been chairman of the board of directors of Viking Bank.

He was one of the organizers of the first five annual International Banking Congresses, which have been held in Saint Petersburg since 1992.

He is a full member of the St. Petersburg Engineering Academy and the Russian Academy of Investment and Construction Economics, and a corresponding member of the Academy of High School Sciences.

He is the author of more than 30 scholarly works and teaching materials in economics, finance, and banking. For several years, he taught at St. Petersburg State University of Engineering and Economics, St. Petersburg State University of Economics and Finance, and the International Banking Institute.

== Awards, honourable titles ==
His award include: Honoured Economist of Russian Federation and Badge of Honour from the Bank of Russia "For Honourable Service in the Central Bank of the Russian Federation"
