= Banking in the Soviet Union =

The Soviet Union was the first jurisdiction to implement a single-tier banking system, an experience that was subsequently emulated by a number of Communist states.

== Historical and ideological background ==
The notion of a monopolistic state financial system had longstanding roots in the Russian Empire, where fiat currency had been in use for centuries and dominant public banks were established from the 18th century onwards. Following the disastrous aftermath of the Crimean War, this public banking system had to be entirely rebuilt and expanded to the private sector in the 1860s, with milestones including the establishment of the State Bank of the Russian Empire in 1861 and that of the first private-sector commercial bank in 1866. In the late 19th century, slavophile journalist S. F. Sharapov advocated the creation of a "universal bank" that would fulfil the need of an autarkic Russian economy without having to abide by the constraints of the gold standard.

On the eve of the Russian Communist Revolution, its leader Vladimir Lenin held similar views. In a later oft-quoted text, he wrote in October 1917 (italics in original): "Without big banks, socialism would be impossible. The big banks are the "state apparatus" which we need to bring about socialism, and which we take ready-made from capitalism. [...] A single State Bank, the biggest of the big, with branches in every rural district, in every factory, will constitute as much as nine-tenths of the socialist apparatus. There will be country-wide bookkeeping, country-wide accounting of the production and distribution of goods; this will be, so to speak, something in the nature of the skeleton of socialist society."

Lenin's vision, which echoed Sharapov's without having apparently being directly influenced by it, was not universally held in the revolutionary movement, and was not immediately implemented. Grigory Sokolnikov, the People's Commissar of Finance in the mid-1920s, was thus quoted as saying that "finance should not exist in a socialist community". Still, later Marxist-Leninist doctrine held in line with Lenin's writing that the socialist state should use finance "as an instrument of socialist construction" and "as one of the most important instruments in carrying out its function", with banking forming part of a financial system that also includes the fiscal and budgeting framework of the state, social insurance, and budget control of state and collective enterprises.

== Soviet Era ==
Soon after the Bolshevik takeover, the new regime nationalized all land, thus placing mortgage lenders such as the Nobles' Land Bank and Peasants' Land Bank in immediate liquidation. On 14 December 1917, it decreed the immediate nationalization of all commercial banks into the People's Bank, the new name it had given to the State Bank of the Russian Empire. In January 1920, the People's Bank was in turn abolished, after its regional offices had been merged with those of the state treasury. During the period of War Communism that followed, the part of the country controlled by the Bolsheviks was reduced to a barter economy with no banking activity whatsoever. The residual monetary means of exchange were notes directly issued by the state treasury, known as Sovznaks (Soviet tokens), which depreciated fast, with hyperinflation peaking in the first half of 1922.

Following the re-establishment of the State Bank of the USSR (Gosbank) in October 1921, the Soviet banking system again took shape as part of the New Economic Policy (NEP). Following the NEP, the Soviet system relied on several specialized financial institutions, which were reorganized in waves of reform following major leadership transitions in 1928–1932, 1955–1959, and one last time 1987-1988 shortly before the unravelling of the Communist system.

The system made a sharp distinction between, on the one hand, state-funded credit institutions whose purpose was to finance the economy, and on the other hand, deposit-funded institutions aimed at funding the state itself. The first category included the Gosbank and a series of ostensibly more specialized promotional banks. In the second category was the State Labor Savings Banks System of the USSR, which had a monopoly on the collection of household savings.

The Gosbank centralized the deposits of all state entities and was the only provider of short-term credit in the system following a decree of 30 January 1930. the Gosbank also provided long-term credit, but was not alone in that role which was also supported by the specialized promotional banks. The latter varied over time and included the Prombank (est. 1922) for trade and industry, Tsekombank (est. 1925) for construction, and Selkhozbank (est. 1932) for agriculture, which were eventually merged in 1959 to form the Construction Bank of the USSR or Stroybank.

In addition to the savings banks, a cooperative banking system was established in 1922 as the Bank of Consumer Cooperatives (Russian: Банк потребительской кооперации or Pokobank), reorganized in 1923 as the All-Russian Cooperative Bank (Russian: Всероссийский кооперативный банк or Vsekobank), then replaced in 1936 with the All-Union Bank for Financing the Capital Construction of Trade and Cooperation (Russian: Всесоюзному банку финансирования капитального строительства торговли и кооперации or Torgbank), which was eventually abolished in 1956.

Whereas the Soviet banking system was largely designed for autarkic resilience, it nevertheless included institutions dedicated to promoting foreign trade and to procure hard currency. The Foreign Trade Bank of the USSR (Vneshtorgbank, established 1922 as Russian Trade Bank and renamed 1924) played a major role in trade finance. Furthermore, the Gosbank created a network of foreign subsidiaries including Moscow Narodny Bank in London from 1919, Banque Commerciale pour l'Europe du Nord in Paris from 1921, Garantie- und Kreditbank für den Osten from 1922, (Note: To process transactions with Russia and later the Soviet Union after 1923, the Swedish banker Olof Aschberg established a Russian commercial bank in Berlin (1920) as the Garantie und Kreditbank für den Osten (Garcrebo) and the Russian commercial bank (Russian: Роскомбанк) in Moscow (1922) which later became a Soviet joint stock bank named the "Foreign Trade Bank of the USSR" (1924) or the Vneshtorgbank (Russian: Внешторгбанк) which was renamed the "Bank for Foreign Economic Affairs of the USSR" (1988) or Vnesheconombank (Russian: Внешэкономбанк) which was renamed VEB (17 May 2007). Garcrebo conducted transactions between the Soviet Union and both Germany and the United States. In Berlin, the Garantie und Kreditbank für den Osten remained open after Hitler took office because of extraterritoriality and operated until 22 June 1941 when Nazi Germany attacked the Soviet Union to start the Great Patriotic War. After the war as a state controlled Soviet overseas bank under Gosbank, the Garantie und Kreditbank AG (Garkrebo) replaced the Garantie und Kreditbank für den Osten (Garcrebo) with approval from Vasily Sokolovsky on 27 May 1945.) and Russo-Iranian Bank in Tehran from 1923. In the Brezhnev Era, these were complemented with Wozchod Handelsbank (est. 1966 in Zurich), Ost-West Handelsbank (est. 1971 in Frankfurt), Donau Bank (est. 1974 in Vienna), and East-West United Bank (est. 1974 in Luxembourg). The Russo-Iranian Bank, however, was nationalized in 1980 following the Iranian Revolution, and the Wozchod Handelsbank's license was suspended in 1985 due to irregularities.

== Perestroika reform and aftermath ==
Under Perestroika in 1988, the Soviet Union initiated a transition towards a two-tiered system, with a number of new cooperative banks licensed starting from August 1988, the first being Soyuz-Bank in Shymkent (now in Kazakhstan) followed by Patent Bank in Leningrad. The Stroybank was reorganized in 1988 as the State Commercial Industrial and Construction Bank of the USSR (Russian: Государственный коммерческий Промышленно-строительный банк СССР or Promstroybank), with some operations spun off as Agro-Industrial Bank (Russian: Агропромышленный банк СССР or Agroprombank) and Bank of Housing, Communal Services and Social Development (Russian: Банк жилищно-коммунального хозяйства и социального развития СССР or Zhilsotsbank).

During the dissolution of the Soviet Union, the Soviet banks were largely broken down into national components in the newly independent post-Soviet states, while the Russian entities retained most remaining international commitments. In the 1990s and 2000s, the surviving daughter banks in Frankfurt, London, Luxembourg, Paris and Vienna were absorbed into VTB Bank and closely associated with the Bank of Russia. The East-West United Bank was privatized in stages from 2001 to 2018, then fully owned by the Sistema conglomerate. Following European banking union, VTB in 2018 merged its three euro-area subsidiaries into one Frankfurt-based entity, closing the Paris office and transforming the Vienna office into a branch. That German entity was in turn closed in 2022 following the invasion of Ukraine, as were VTB's still-separate subsidiary in London and East-West United Bank in Luxembourg.

== See also ==
- Banking in China
