= Dmitri Lebedev =

Dmitri (or Dimitri, Dmytro, Dzmitry) Lebedev may refer to:

- Dmitri Lebedev (businessman) (born 1968), CEO of Rossiya Bank
- Dmitri Lebedev (general) (1872–1935), Russian general
- Dzmitry Lebedzew (born 1986), Belarusian footballer
