= Prominvestbank =

Ukrainian bank

- Company type: Public Joint-Stock Company
- Industry: banking, investment
- Founded: August 1992
- Fate: Deposit Guarantee Fund began liquidation
- Headquarters: Kyiv, Ukraine
- Owner: Cypriot company Luregio Limited
- Number of employees: 13,500
- Website: www.pib.ua/en/

Prominvestbank (full name: Joint Stock Commercial Industrial & Investment Bank) was a bank based in Kyiv, Ukraine, formed in August 1992 from the Ukrainian operations of the Industrial and Construction Bank of the USSR. Having come under Russian state ownership, it was forcibly liquidated in 2022 at the start of the Russo-Ukrainian War.

The head office of Prominvestbank was located at 12, Shevchenko lane, Kyiv 01001, Ukraine. Prominvestbank had more than 850 branches in all regions of Ukraine.

== History ==
The history of the bank went back to the early 1920s, with the establishment of the soviet Prombank in 1922 and the opening on 1 January 1923 of its All-Ukrainian Office in Kharkiv. In 1936-1937, the All-Ukrainian Office of Prombank was relocated to Kyiv. During the reconstruction period that followed World War II, the bank participated actively in restoring various key industrial enterprises, including the reconstruction of Dnipro Hydroelectric Power Station, development of the Donbass coal-mines and other projects of national importance.

In 1959, Prombank was merged into the Construction Bank of the USSR, or Stroybank. As a result, in addition to financing industrial, transport and communication enterprises, the bank started lending to the education and housing sectors. During this period, Stroybank was responsible for financing approx. 70% of all capital investments in the Ukrainian economy. In 1987, the Central Committee of the Communist Party and the Council of Ministers of the USSR adopted a resolution under which Stroybank was reorganized into the Industrial and Construction Bank of the USSR, known as Promstroybank in Russian and Prombudbank in Ukrainian.

The independence of Ukraine opened a new chapter of the Bank’s development. On 26 August 1992, Prombudbank was re-organised as a joint-stock company named the Industrial and Investment Bank, in shorthand Prominvestbank of Ukraine. On June 27, 2001, the name of the bank was changed to Joint Stock Commercial Industrial & Investment Bank (Prominvestbank).

Three times in 2003, 2004 and in 2006 Prominvestbank was awarded The Bank of the Year for Ukraine by the world known English magazine "The Banker".

In October 2008, due to a sharp outflow of clients' funds, the bank's liquidity significantly decreased. A decision of the National Bank of Ukraine dated October 7, 2008, introduced a temporary administration in the bank.

In January 2009, Prominvestbank was still one of Ukraine’s largest banks in terms of assets (₴27.5 billion), credit portfolio (₴24.1 billion) and capital (₴3.3 billion). The bank's assets in 2015 were ₴41.65 billion, its net worth as of the end of 2015 was negative and was estimated at ₴12.272 billion, whereas it was positive in 2014 and stood at ₴7.948 billion.

In 2016, the main shareholder of Prominvestbank with 99.4% of all shares was Russian state-owned Vnesheconombank. On March 15, 2017, the Ukrainian President Petro Poroshenko imposed sanctions on Prominvestbank (and other Russian state-owned banks operating in Ukraine: Vnesheconombank, VTB Bank, BM Bank, Sberbank, and VS Bank (Ukrainian: ВіЕс Банк)) as part of its continued sanctions on Russia for its annexation of Crimea and involvement in the War in Donbass. After that, Vnesheconombank bank tried to sell its Ukrainian subsidiary; as of August 2017 unsuccessfully. At Sochi in February, 2018, Vnesheconombank's Sergey Gorkov said they hoped to sell its Ukrainian subsidiary, Prominvestbank, by May 2018. In March 2020 a 99.77% stake in Prominvestbank was sold to a company named Fortifay, who sold these shares in October 2020 to Cypriot company Luregio Limited (Luregio Limited's ultimate beneficiar is Serhiy Tihipko).

In February 2022, the liquidation process was started based on decisions of the Board of the National Bank on the revocation of the banking license and liquidation of Prominvestbank.

== See also ==
- List of banks in Ukraine
