= Chervonets =

Former currency of Russia

Chervonets (pl.: chervontsy) is the traditional Russian name for large foreign and domestic gold coins. The name comes from the Russian term червонное золото (chervonnoye zoloto), meaning 'red gold' (also known as rose gold) – the old name of a high-grade gold type.

Originally, this gold coin was identical to the gold ducat of 3.5 grams, 98.6% fine gold. The first known chervonets of Russian coinage was the Ugric gold; it was created in the 15th century under Ivan III. Sometimes, chervonets were considered any large gold coin, including imperial and semi-imperial coins.

Since the beginning of the 20th century, banknotes were often referred to as chervonets with the value of ten units (for example, rubles, hryvnia, euro, etc.). This is due to the initiation of the Russian Soviet Federative Socialist Republic during the monetary reform of 1922–1924 banknotes, or chervonets. They were provided with the same amount of gold that was contained in a coin of 10 rubles during the reign of Nicholas II. A small percentage of gold coins were issued in denominations of one chervonets with a picture of a peasant on the front and a coat of arms of the RSFSR on the back. According to the weight characteristics (8.6 g of 900 samples) and the size of the coin, the chervonets completely matched the pre-revolutionary coin of 10 rubles.

== Chervontsy in the Russian Empire ==
=== Ducats of foreign coinage ===
In 1252, Florence, Italy issued a gold coin of 3.537 grams, which was soon called the florin. A similar coin, the genovino, began to be minted in Genoa, Italy. In 1284, Venice followed by example; these coins are known as ducats (from the 16th century, they became known as the sequin). They first weighed a little more than florins, but shortly after became equal to them. Soon, the name "ducat" was well established all over Europe as a synonym for a high-quality gold coin weighing about 3.5 grams. Imitations of the ducat were minted in almost all European countries, some even up to modern times. The basic types of these imitations were: Hungarian, German, and Dutch. The first Hungarian imitation was well known in Eastern Europe and Russia, thus becoming the prototype of the Polish zloty, Russian gold (chervonets), and also Hungarian forint. In Germany, imitations of cechinas and florins were originally called gulden (later Goldgulden), but because of a rapid decrease in weight, there was a need to return to the prototype in 1559 and the name "ducat" was accepted (silver coins began to be called guldens and florins). Dutch ducats began to be minted relatively late (only in 1586), but in such quantities that in the 17th and 18th centuries they became one of the most important coins of world trade. Some countries (in particular, Austria) minted ducats before the First World War.

=== Chervontsy of Russian coinage ===
Beginning with Ivan III until Peter the Great, gold coins that were minted were known as chervontsy or chervony, but they were used mainly as award medals. Depicted on them were either a two-headed eagle on both sides or a tsarist portrait and a two-headed eagle.

As a result of the monetary reforms of Peter I in Russia, a new monetary system was introduced and the first chervontsy appeared. In their weight (3.47 g) and [alloy] sample (986), they fully corresponded to the Hungarian ducat (golden Ugric). These coins were also issued in denominations of two chervonets with a mass of 6.94 g. 118 copies of the first chervontsy were issued in 1701. Chervontsy were usually only used in trade with foreigners.

The Chervonets of 1706 (the date is in letters) is the only known copy in gold. From the collection of Biron the coin got to a museum in Vienna. Although gold chervonsty from 1706 exists in private collections in Russia, these were both removed from pendants, thus without flaws. In the Hermitage there is a copy in low-grade silver, which is authentic (tested by Udzenikov). The known replica of this chervonets are made of high-grade silver and copper. B.S. Yusupov noted in his book, "The Coins of the Russian Empire" (Kazan, 1999, p. 231) that before the silver chervonets of 1706 were known as a shestak. Today, the low-grade silver chervonets of 1706 is an unidentified coin in the Russian numismatics system. When confirming a sample of silver about 210, it should be recognized as the first shestak. There are two types of [shestak] coins: without the medal on the chest and with the medal on the chest. On each form there are several variants of stamps with small differences in details. The cost of a new copy in high-grade silver in 2010 is about 50 thousand rubles.The description of a 1706-year old chervonets (1707 model) with the letters of the engraver, IL-L. In the domestic market, gold chervontsy were traded at a rate of 2 rubles and 20 kopecks to 2 rubles 30 kopecks.

Under Peter I, the chervonets were minted from 1701 to 1716. Then, for gold use in the country, gold coins with a face value of two rubles with a smaller breakdown were minted. They portrayed the patron of Russia, Saint Andrew I. The coining of the chervonets was renewed by Peter II in 1729. During the reign of Elizabeth, chervonetz had in addition to the year, information about the month and, more rarely, the date of coinage were given. On the reverse of Elizaveta Petrovna's chervonets there is a coat of arms, a two-headed eagle, and on the reverse of a double chervonets is the image of St. Andrew.

With Paul, the coinage of gold coins without a denomination with mass and a regular breakdown for chervonets was briefly restored, but they were quickly rejected, adjusting the release of a 5 and 10 ruble coin with a high .986 breakdown, which was subsequently reduced to .916 (88/96). In the future, coins without par value were not issued.

Chervonsty are also called gold coins with a 3-ruble denomination, .917 tests and weighing 3.93 grams., Consent of their release was received by the State Council from Alexander II on February 11, 1869.

Distribution of coinage by years
The Emperor	Chervonets	Double Chervonets
Peter I	1701–1703, 1706–1707, 1710–1714, 1716	1701–1702, 1714
Peter II	1729	
Anna Iannovna	1730, 1738, 1739	
Elizabeth	1742–1744, 1746–1749, 1751–1753, 1755–1759	1749, 1751, 1755
Peter III	1762	1762–1783, 178–1786, 1795–1796
Paul I	1796, 1797	
Alexander II	1802, 1804–1805	

=== Platinum Chervontsy ===
Platinum coins were minted in Russia in the middle of the 19th century, they were sometimes called white or Ural chervontsy. By 1827, the Russian treasury had accumulated large reserves of platinum, extracted from the Ural mountains. Its quantity was so great that the selling of them would crumble the metals market, so it was decided to put them into circulation. Count Georg Ludwig Cancrin was the originator of platinum coins. The coins were made of untreated platinum (97%), and were minted from 1828 to 1845 with denominations of 3, 6, and 12 rubles.

Such unusual denominations in Russia appeared for the convenience of coinage, their sizes was chosen to be the equivalent of a 25 kopeck, a half ruble coin, and one ruble coin, the amount of metal in the coins with the equivalent amount of metal.

In the first case of this coinage, all coins were minted entirely out of platinum. Before that, platinum was used to produce coins only as a ligature (in metallurgy) to gold or copper (with the counterfeiting of coins).

=== Dutch ducats of Russian coinage ===
Exact replicas of Dutch ducats (chervontsy) were secretly minted from 1735 to 1868 at the St. Petersburg Mint. In official documents, these coins were known as “famous coins”. Initially, the coins were intended only for foreign payments and salary payments to Russian troops who were conducting military operations in Central Asia, the Caucasus and Poland. Eventually, the coins fell into internal circulation in these places. Local names were used - lobanchik, arapchik, and puchkovyi (from the depiction of the soldier on the coin clutching arrows). These ducats were taken out of circulation in Holland in 1849 (this is the last date on the Russian copies), and in Russia they ceased to be minted in 1868 after the protest of the Dutch government.

=== Imperial ===
In 1898–1911 under Nicholas II, gold coins were minted from the alloy of 900 samples with values of 5, 7.5, 10 and 15 rubles. The content of pure gold in the 10 ruble coin was, 1 spool and 78.24 shares (7.74235 g). The total weight of the coin was 8.6 g. The coins in denominations of 15 and 7.5 rubles were called, respectively, imperial and semi-imperial. After the monetary reform of 1922–1924, coins with a value of 10 rubles were called “chervonets”, even though in reality they were not. This name entrenched itself because the chervonets began to be called the base monetary unit first in the RSFSR, and then the USSR, it was equivalent to 10 Soviet rubles and like the tsarist ten-ruble coin, contained 7.74235 g of gold.

== Chervonets in Soviet Russia ==
The first years of Soviet power were marked by the disorder of the money-circulation system and a high rate of inflation. Currencies in circulation included tsarist credit tickets, Duma money, "kerenki", securities and sovznaki (Russian: совзнаки), which did not enjoy the confidence of the population. The first denomination in 1922 (the exchange was made against 1:10,000) ordered the monetary system, but could not stop inflation. The 11th Congress of the RCP (B.) in March/April 1922 adopted a policy of creating a stable Soviet currency - the resolution of the Congress stated:

For this moment, it is necessary, without in the least setting the task of an immediate return to the golden appeal, to firmly establish that our economic and financial policies are resolutely oriented towards restoring the gold standard.

There was a discussion about how to name the new money. There were proposals to abandon old names and to introduce new, "revolutionary" ones. For example, the workers of the People's Commissariat of Finance proposed calling the unit of hard Soviet currency the "federal". Traditional names were also proposed: "hryvnia", "tselkovy" and "chervonets". Because the hryvnia had circulated in the anti-Soviet Ukrainian People's Republic of 1917 to 1921, and because the "ruble" was associated with the silver ruble, it was decided to call the new money "chervontsy".

In October of the same year, the State Bank of the RSFSR was granted the right to issue banknotes in gold, with a value of 1/2, 1, 2, 5, 10, 25 and 50 chervonets. This money was completely backed by the state with reserves of precious metals and foreign currency, goods and bills of reliable enterprises. Already before their release, the pre-revolutionary gold ruble became the basis for financial calculations in the RSFSR, and in 1922 it was legalized as a payment instrument.

On November 27, 1922 the circulation of banknotes in denominations of 1, 3, 5, 10 and 25 chervontsy began. The denominations of 1/2, 2 and 50 chervontsy were withdrawn, though in 1928 a note with value of 2 chervontsy went into circulation. On banknotes it was recorded that 1 chervonets contained 1 spool and 78.24 shares (7.74 grams) of pure gold, and that "the beginning of the exchange is established by a special governmental act".

The market valued the Tsarist-era gold ten-ruble coin at 12,500 sovznaki of 1922; the State Bank, which was guided by the conjuncture, estimated one chervonets was worth 11,400 sovznaki, somewhat lower than the price of a gold ten-ruble coin.

The population showed confidence in the new chervonets, viewing it not so much as a medium of circulation, but as a non-monetary security. Many expected that there would be an exchange of paper chervontsy for gold, although no government act on the free exchange of the chervonets for gold was issued. Nevertheless, the population changed paper chervontsy to royal gold coins and vice versa, sometimes even with a small overpayment for paper chervontsy (due to the convenience of liquidity and storage). Thanks to this, the course of the chervonets remained stable, which gave a solid foundation for the deployment of the Soviet New Economic Policy (NEP) of 1921 to 1928.

There is an opinion that the introduction of "solid" money marked the failure of the Bolshevik social experiment five years after its inception in 1917.

=== Strengthening of the chervonets ===
During 1923, the share of chervonets in the total Soviet money supply increased from 3% to 80%. Two currency systems operated within the country. The State Bank announced a new exchange rate of the chervonets daily against the ruble, which created speculation and created difficulties for the development of trade and economic activity. The chervonets became predominantly a city currency. In the village, only well-off peasants could afford to purchase it, while for the mass of peasants it was too expensive. At the same time, peasants believed that it was unprofitable to sell their goods for sovznaky, and this led to an increase in the prices of agricultural products and a reduction in their supply to the city. This was the reason for the second denomination (1:100) of the ruble.

Gradually, the chervonets began to penetrate foreign markets. From April 1, 1924, the course of the chervonets was quoted on the New York Stock Exchange. Throughout April, the chervonets stood at a level higher than its dollar parity. In 1924–1925, informal transactions with chervontsy took place in London and Berlin. At the end of 1925 the question of its quotation on the Vienna Stock Exchange was solved in principle. By that time, the chervonets was officially quoted in Milan, Riga, Rome, Constantinople, Tehran, and Shanghai. The Soviet chervonets could be exchanged or purchased in countries practically all over the world.

=== Golden Chervonets ===
Simultaneously with the release of paper chervontsy, in October 1922 a decision was made to issue chervontsy in the form of coins. According to its weight characteristics (8.6 g, 900 sample) and the size of the chervonets, it fully corresponded to the pre-revolutionary coin of 10 rubles. The artist of the drawing was the chief medalist of the Petrograd mint, A. F. Vasyutinskiy (who also designed the 1934 version of the medal of the Order of Lenin and the first badge of the Ready for Labour and Defence of the USSR program (Russian: Готов к труду и обороне СССР). The face side of the coin depicted the emblem of the RSFSR; on the reverse was a farmer-sower, modeled from the sculpture by I. D. Shadr (the models were two peasants in the village of Pragovaya Shadrinsky: Perfiliy Petrovich Kalganov and Kipriyan Kirillovich Avdeev), which is now in the Tretyakov Gallery. All the chervontsy of this period are dated "1923".

Metal chervonets were mainly used by the Soviet government for foreign-trade operations, but some of the coins also had circulation within Russia. Coins were usually issued in Moscow and from there spread throughout the country. With the beginning of the issue of metal gold chervonets for trade with foreign countries a problem arose: Western countries resolutely refused to accept these coins, since they depicted Soviet symbols. The solution was found instantly – the Soviet Mint began issuing a gold chervonts sample of Nicholas II, which received unconditional acceptance abroad. Thus, the Soviet government bought necessary goods abroad with coins depicting the deposed tsar.

In 1924, after the formation of the USSR, it was decided to issue a new type of coins, with the coat of arms of the RSFSR replaced by the USSR coat of arms, but only test specimens were issued, they were dated 1925 and had exceptional rarity. The non-use of the metal chervonets was explained by the fact that the financial system of the country was sufficiently strong enough to give up free circulation of gold. In addition, abroad, seeing the strengthening of the chervonets, traders refused to calculate in a gold coin in favor of gold bars or foreign currency.

=== After the NEP ===
The collapse of NEP and the beginning of industrialization made the metal chervonets unnecessary for the economic system of the USSR. The course of the chervonets fell to 5.4 rubles per dollar and subsequently ceased to be quoted abroad. In order to unify the financial system, the ruble was tied to a paper chervontsy. Already in 1925, one chervonets was equal to 10 rubles. Subsequently, the import and export of gold chervontsy from the USSR was banned.

In 1937 a new series of banknotes in denominations of 1, 3, 5 and 10 chervonets was issued. They were the first to show a portrait of Lenin.

An exceptionally rare sample of a copper coin was minted in 1925; in all respects it was completely identical to a similar gold coin. In April 2008 one was sold at a Moscow auction for 5 million rubles (about $165,000).

=== The 1980 Olympics ===
From 1975 to 1982, the State Bank of the USSR issued the 1923 model of the chervonets coin with the emblem of the RSFSR and new dates, there were a total of 7,350,000 copies in circulation.

It is believed that the issue of these coins was timed to the Olympics in Moscow (1980). These coins were also a legal means of payment, and mandatory for admission throughout the USSR, such as jubilee coins made of precious metals. They were sold to foreign tourists and used in foreign-trade operations.

Since the mid-1990s, the "Olympic chervontsy" have been sold by the Central Bank as investment coins. By the decision of the Central Bank in 2001 they were made a legal tender in the territory of the Russian Federation together with a silver coin with a nominal value of 3 rubles known as a "Sable".

At the moment, "newly-made" chervontsy were used as investment coins and were implemented by a number of banks – both Russian and foreign.

=== Uses of the word ===
- Today, in everyday life, banknotes with a nominal value of ten units are called "chervontsy" or "chiriki". This applies not only to Russian, Tajik, and Transnistrian rubles, but also to modern banknotes with values of 10 hryvnias, euros or dollars. Among other things, having a reddish tinge, distinguished Tsarist and Soviet as banknotes with a face value of 10 rubles.
- In Russian criminal argot, "chervonets" refers to ten years of imprisonment.
- The saying, "I'm not a chervonets, to please everyone" reflects the high value of the gold coin with this denomination.
- In Mikhail Bulgakov's play "Zoikin's Flat" (1926), Soviet chervontsy in the Nepmen slang of the 1920s are called "worms" (chervi or chervyaki in Russian) as a play on words.

== Pre-revolutionary chervonets ==
The term comes from Polish czerwony złoty. Before the reign of Peter I, the name chervonets was applied to various foreign gold coins in circulation in Russia, mostly Dutch ducats and Venetian sequins. In 1701, Russia introduced its own gold chervonets, which had the same mass (3.47 g) and alloy (.986) as the ducat. Unlike the gold coins minted in Russia from the 15th to the 17th centuries, which were used as awards only, the chervonets of Peter I took their place in the monetary system and were used in foreign trade. Chervontsy were minted until 1757, when they were displaced by the golden ruble (with a lower alloy) and by counterfeits of the Dutch ducat, which by then met the demand for trade in gold coins.

Under Nicolas II, the finance minister Sergei Witte conducted a currency reform and 10-ruble gold coin (Nicolas II chervonets) started to be used in parallel with gold imperial (15-ruble gold coin) as a principal legal tender of the Russian golden standard. The mintage of 10 ruble coins from 1897 to 1911 was over 40 million pieces. Gold coins were in circulation and could be exchanged for banknotes of the same denomination without restrictions. On the 23 July/ 5 August 1914 a paper-to-gold exchange was suspended "temporarily" and never restored.

== Soviet Union ==
=== New Economic Policy (NEP) ===
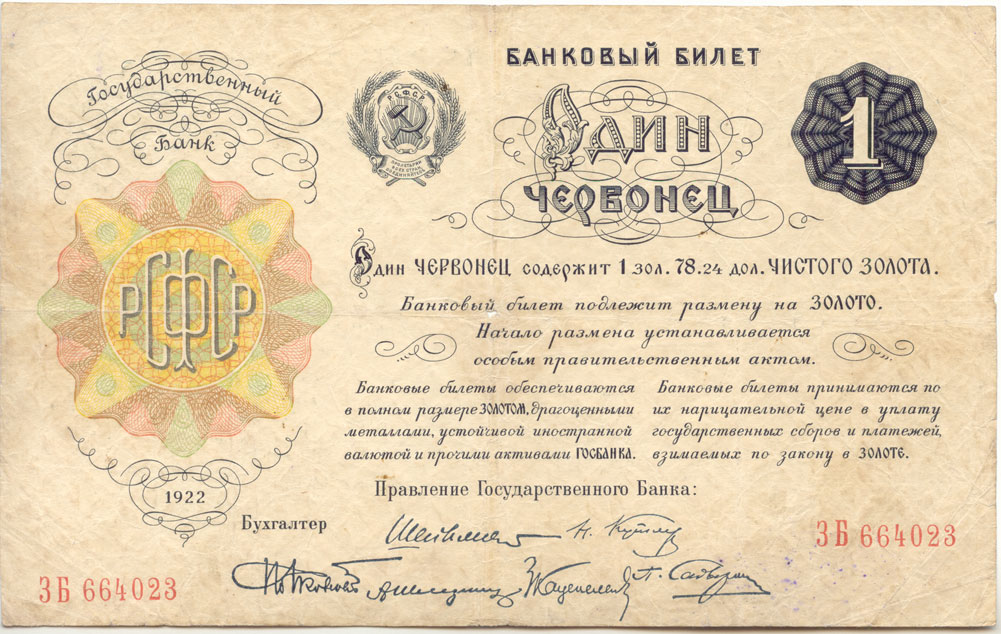
Chervonets 1922

In 1922, during the civil war, the Soviet government tried to enforce Communist economic ideals and eliminate debt through systematic devaluation of the ruble and its associated currencies (various forms of Imperial ruble, kerenki and later sovznaki). Meanwhile, the authorities introduced a parallel currency, called the chervonets, which was fully convertible and backed by the gold standard. The chervonets existed in paper form (for domestic circulation) and as gold coins (for international payments). These coins contained 8.6 g of .900 alloy, and fetched a high rate on the foreign stock exchanges, allowing the financing of the Soviet Union's New Economic Policy. 2,751,200 coins with the year 1923 on the reverse were minted in 1923 (1,113,200 pieces) and 1924 (1,638,000 pieces).

With the creation of the Soviet Union (USSR) new national symbols were introduced, reflected in the design of Soviet coins. By February 1925, chervonets coins featuring the insignia of the Soviet Union had been designed, and a limited number of test coins dated 1925 were struck. However, these were not mass-produced owing to low perceived demand for them from the main international trading partners of the Soviet Union.

Original gold chervonets coins were minted in 1923 and 1925. Very few chervonets coins remain from 1923 (almost all coins, which were not sold abroad and remained in state vaults, were recast into bars or used in production of Soviet military orders) and they have recently sold for over $7,000. There is widespread misconception about the 1925 issue: all English sources copy each other and say that only one gold chervonets from 1925 survived, but this is not entirely true (see on locations below). At an auction in April 2008 in Moscow, a single surviving production sample copper chervonets from 1925 with slightly modified design from 1923 appeared. It showed the letters SSSR (Russian: СССР) instead of RSFSR (Russian: РСФСР), and introduced a new coat of arms (which only featured the first seven Soviet republics, whereas by 1939 the USSR had eleven). This copper sample sold for $200,000.

After the introduction in the United Kingdom of the Gold Standard Act 1925, which established a new procedure for buy-sell operations with gold, the gold coins issued after 1914 ceased to be accepted by the Bank of England. As a result, interest in the Soviet chervonets in Europe fell sharply. To obtain much-needed foreign currency, the Soviet Government decided to strike 10 ruble coins in the pre-revolutionary design, bearing the portrait of the murdered Tsar Nicholas II. These coins were accepted without problems. Six hundred thousand gold 10 ruble coins were struck in 1925 from the old dies which had survived the 1917 Revolution and the subsequent civil war. These coins were dated 1911. The following year, 1926, the government minted a further 1,411,000 of the same coins, as well as 1,000,000 gold 5 ruble coins dated 1898 on the reverse and again with the portrait of Nicholas II on the obverse. The transition of the European currency system in the second half of the 1920s to a gold bullion standard led to a minimum volume requirement of 400 troy ounces for inter-bank gold deals. This resulted in the increased use of bullion bars and rendered it pointless to mint precious metal coins for international payments. A part of residual coins with the tsar portrait was used by Soviet intelligence agents in secret operations abroad.

Before industrialisation the value of the chervonets was pegged at 10 rubles, and production of gold coins ceased.

In 1930 the chervonets was withdrawn from the foreign payments turnover and its quotation on international currency exchanges was ceased.

As of today, there exist five known gold chervontsy from 1925. All are located in Moscow. Three are stored in the museum of Goznak, Russia's official mint. The other two are in the Pushkin State Museum of Fine Arts.

=== 1930s and later ===
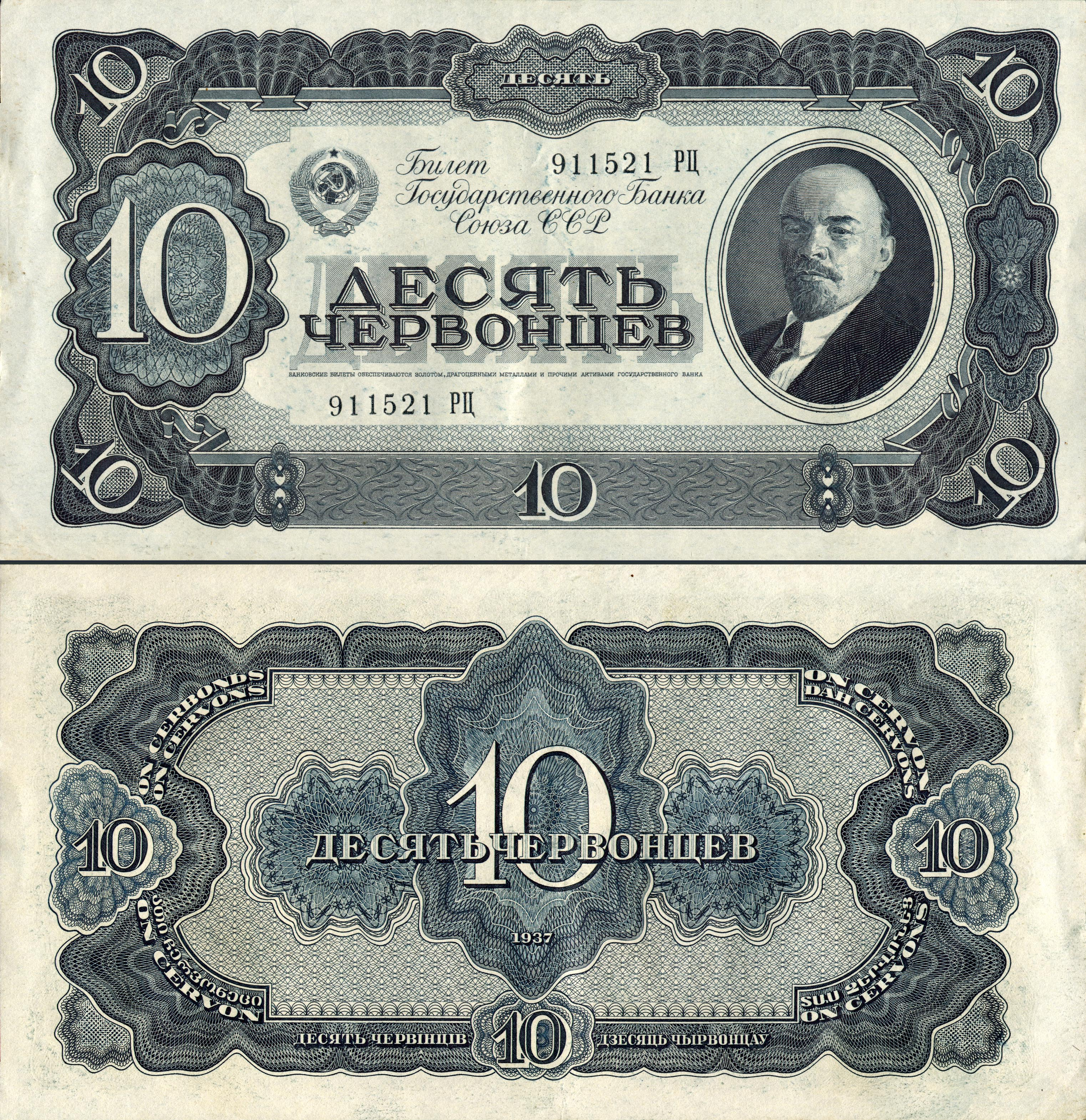
Ten-chervonets note, 1937

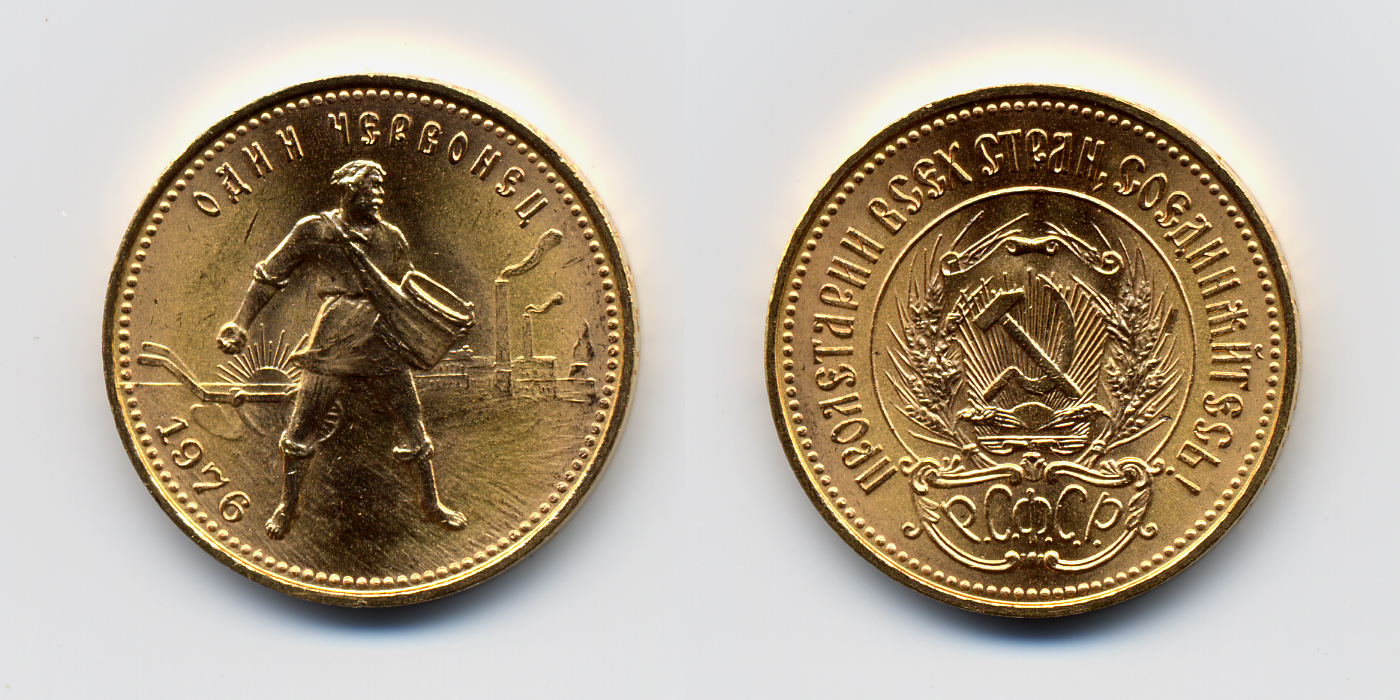
A 1976 remint of a 1923 Soviet Russian golden chervonets (10 roubles)

In 1937 one-, three-, five-, and ten-chervonets banknotes in new design were issued, and Lenin's portrait first appeared on chervonets banknotes. But inscription on gold equivalent of chervonets was replaced with information that banknotes are backed with gold, precious metals and other assets of the State Bank.

The chervonets was suspended entirely after the monetary reform of 1947. However, a large number of golden chervontsy were struck in the 1920s design before the 1980 Summer Olympics in Moscow, for sale to collectors (1,000,000 coins of proof quality dated 1980) and businesses (6,565,000 uncirculated coins, dated 1975–1982). It was hoped that the Soviet chervontsy would compete with the South African Krugerrand, the popular bullion coin of the time. This issue contains 8.6026 g of .900 fine gold (0.2489 troy ounces).

In 1995 the Central Bank of the Russian Federation launched sales of 1975−1982 gold-chervonets bullion coins to Russian commercial banks. In 2001 the late-Soviet gold chervonets was granted the status of a legal tender by the Central Bank and turned into an official investment coin. In the middle of the 2000s the stock of gold chervonets in the Central Bank's vaults came to the end, and a minting of a new investment gold coin, Saint George the Victorious, was started in 2006.

The premiums on Russian gold coinage increased following the war against Ukraine for roubles as well as chervonets. The reason for this is sanctions levied on Russia from within Europe and the UK, which forced banks to prevent bank transfers which has any reference to 'Russia' or Russian products regardless of where the seller was based which led to difficulties importing gold chervonet coins into the UK and other European countries during the Russian invasion of Ukraine.

== See also ==
- Hyperinflation in early Soviet Russia
