= Foreign concessions in the USSR =

Foreign investments in the Soviet Union (1920–1930)

Foreign concessions in the Soviet Union were enterprises (commercial, industrial, mining, etc.) with full and partial foreign capital. They existed since 1920 in the RSFSR and later the Soviet Union. While some of the investment contracts were concluded long-term, the vast majority of them were discontinued and even unilaterally terminated by the Soviet Union by mid-1930s according to the December 27, 1930, decree of Sovnarkom. The last concession contract was concluded in 1930. Foreign investments were replaced with work contracts concluded with western companies and professionals.

The concessions were controlled by the Main Concession Committee at the USSR Sovnarkom (Glavkoncesskom).

== Literature ==
- Antony C. Sutton, Western Technology and Soviet Economic Development. Hoover Institution Press, 1971, vol. 1 — 1917—1930, vol. 2 — 1930—1945
