= Tsekombank =

Former Soviet bank

- Company type: Joint-stock company
- Industry: Financial services
- Founded: 1925
- Defunct: 1959
- Fate: Decree from the Soviet Union
- Successor: Construction Bank of the USSR and State Bank of the USSR
- Headquarters: Moscow, Soviet Union
- Area served: Russia
- Products: Banking services

The Central Bank of Public Utilities and Housing Construction (Russian: Центральный банк коммунального хозяйства и жилищного строительства), sometimes also referred to as Central Communal Bank or Communal Economy Bank and commonly as Tsekombank (Russian: Цекомбанк), was a significant component of the Soviet banking system from its establishment in 1925 to 1959, when it was merged with Prombank and Selkhozbank to form the Construction Bank of the USSR, known as Stroybank.

== History ==
The Tsekombank was established on 17 January 1925 as a joint-stock company. It operated mainly through local municipal banks, even though it also had offices of its own in Siberia and Ukraine. Like the Selkhozbank in agriculture, the Tsekombank was a mere conduit for budgetary appropriations and had no autonomy in its credit allocation.

The 1936 Constitution of the Soviet Union resulted in further centralization of housing construction financing at the Tsekombank.

By the Decree of the President of the Soviet Union of April 7, 1959, the Central Bank was abolished, and its functions were distributed between the Construction Bank of the USSR and the State Bank of the USSR.

== See also ==
- Banking in the Soviet Union
