= Aron Sheinman =

Russian banker (1885–1944)

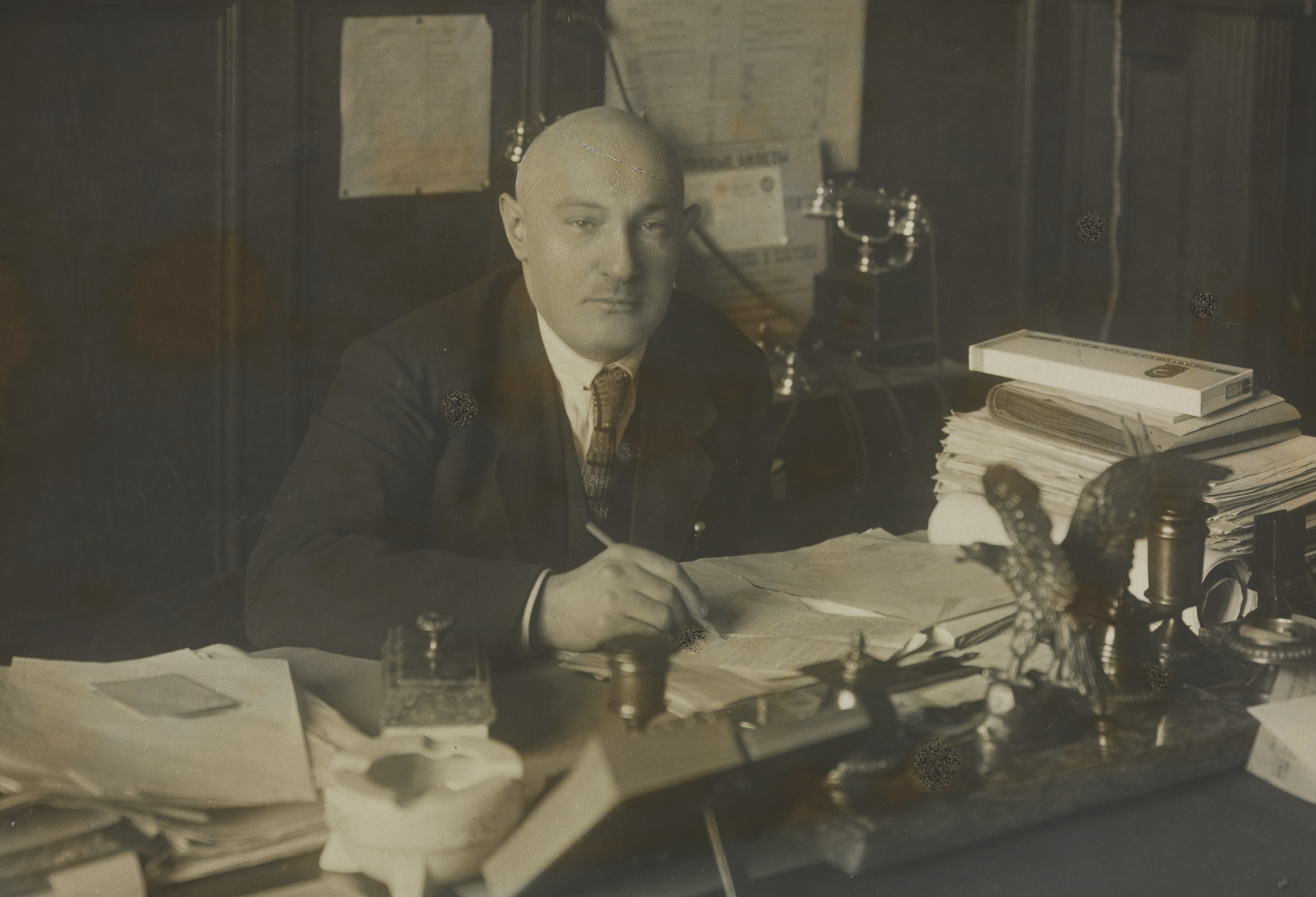
Aron Sheinman

Aron Lvovich Sheinman (Russian: Арон Львович Шейнман) (24 December 1885 – 22 May 1944) was a Bolshevik Revolutionary and Soviet official.

Aron Sheinman was born in Suwałki in a Lithuanian Jewish family. He was twice governor of Gosbank, the central bank of the Soviet Union (1921–1924 and 1926–1929).

In 1922 Lenin wrote him a scathing letter accusing him of being a "communist-mandarin" stating that Gosbank was "a bureaucratic paper game" suggesting that Sheinman had become blinded to the truth by being too engrossed in "the sweet communist-official lies".

In 1937-1939 he was the chairman of the director of the London department of "Intourist". In October 1939 he was recalled from London, but refused to return to the USSR. In 1939 he received British citizenship. He died in London on May 22, 1944.

Political offices
Preceded by position created	Chairman of Board of the Chairman of the Board of the RSFSR State Bank; 1921–1924	Succeeded by N. G. Tumanov
Preceded by N. G. Tumanov	Chairman of Board of the Chairman of the Board of the USSR State Bank; 1926–1929	Succeeded by Georgy Pyatakov
