= Selkhozbank =

Former Soviet bank

- Native name: Сельскохозяйственный банк СССР
- Company type: State-owned enterprise
- Industry: Financial services
- Founded: 1932
- Defunct: 1959
- Fate: Abolished
- Successors: Construction Bank of the USSR and the State Bank of the USSR
- Headquarters: Moscow, Soviet Union
- Area served: Soviet Union
- Products: Loans
- Owner: Government of the Soviet Union

The Agricultural Bank of the USSR (Russian: Сельскохозяйственный банк СССР), commonly referred to as Selkhozbank (Russian: Сельхозбанк), was a significant component of the Soviet banking system from its establishment in 1932 to 1959, when it was merged with Prombank and Tsekombank to form the Construction Bank of the USSR, known as Stroybank.

== History ==
The bank was first established in 1932 as the "Bank for Financing Socialist Agriculture" (Russian: Банк финансирования социалистического земледелия), and renamed as Agricultural Bank in August 1933 (full name in Russian: Банк финансирования социалистического сельского хозяйства).

Like the Tsekombank in residential construction, the Selkhozbank was a mere conduit for budgetary appropriations and had no autonomy in its credit allocation.

== See also ==
- Banking in the Soviet Union
