= Viking Bank =

Russian regional bank

- Company type: Closed Joint Stock Company
- Industry: Banking, Financial services
- Founded: 1988; 38 years ago (current)
- Founder: Alexey Ustaev
- Headquarters: Saint Petersburg, Russia
- Key people: Alexey Ustaev (President)
- Products: Consumer banking, corporate banking, investment banking, mortgage loans, private banking, private equity, wealth management, credit cards,
- Website: www.vikingbank.ru

Viking Bank is a Russian regional bank headquartered in Saint-Petersburg. Viking Bank is a part of the Russian Banking System and is governed by the applicable law of the Russian Federation, being the regulatory acts of the Central Bank of the Russian Federation, and the Charter. Part of this, General Banking License No. 2, was issued by the State Bank of USSR on August 26, 1988. The banks full corporate name is Commercial Bank "Viking" Closed Joint Stock Company. The Bank generally functions on the financial market as a universal credit institution.

== History ==
In August 1988, under late economic liberalisation the USSR begun the period when state banks of industry-specific branches were transformed into commercial banks. During that period the first private commercial bank - Viking Bank - was established as an experiment (at the beginning the Bank's name was "Patent"). At that time there was no law regulating banking activity and the first Charter of the bank was developed on the basis of the Cooperation Act. Viking Bank was given the General Banking License No.2 on August 26, 1988. License No.1 was given one day before to the Union Bank in Kazakhstan that eventually went bankrupt.

== Corporate Affairs ==
Investment financing of companies in the real sector of economy is a core business area for Viking Bank.

== Executives ==
- Victor Halansky – Chairman of the Board of Directors. ScD (Economics), Professor of VAK (Higher Attestation Commission).
- Alexey Ustaev – President, ScD (Economics)

== See also ==
- Banking in the Soviet Union
