= Main Concession Committee =

Soviet government authority

The Main Concession Committee at the Council of Peoples' Commissars of the USSR (Glavkoncesskom) Russian: Главный концессионный комитет при Совете Народных Комиссаров СССР ( ГКК; Главконцесск; Главконцеском; Главконцесском was the Soviet government authority in charge of foreign concessions in the USSR. It existed between 1923 and 1937.

Since then the concessions were in control of the Peoples' Commissariate of Foreign Trade, until the last one was closed (1944).

== Chairmen ==
- Georgy Pyatakov (1923−1925)
- Leon Trotsky (1925–1927)
- Vladimir Ksandrov (1927−1929)
- Lev Kamenev (1929−1932)
- Valentin Trifonov (1932−1937)
