= Red złoty =

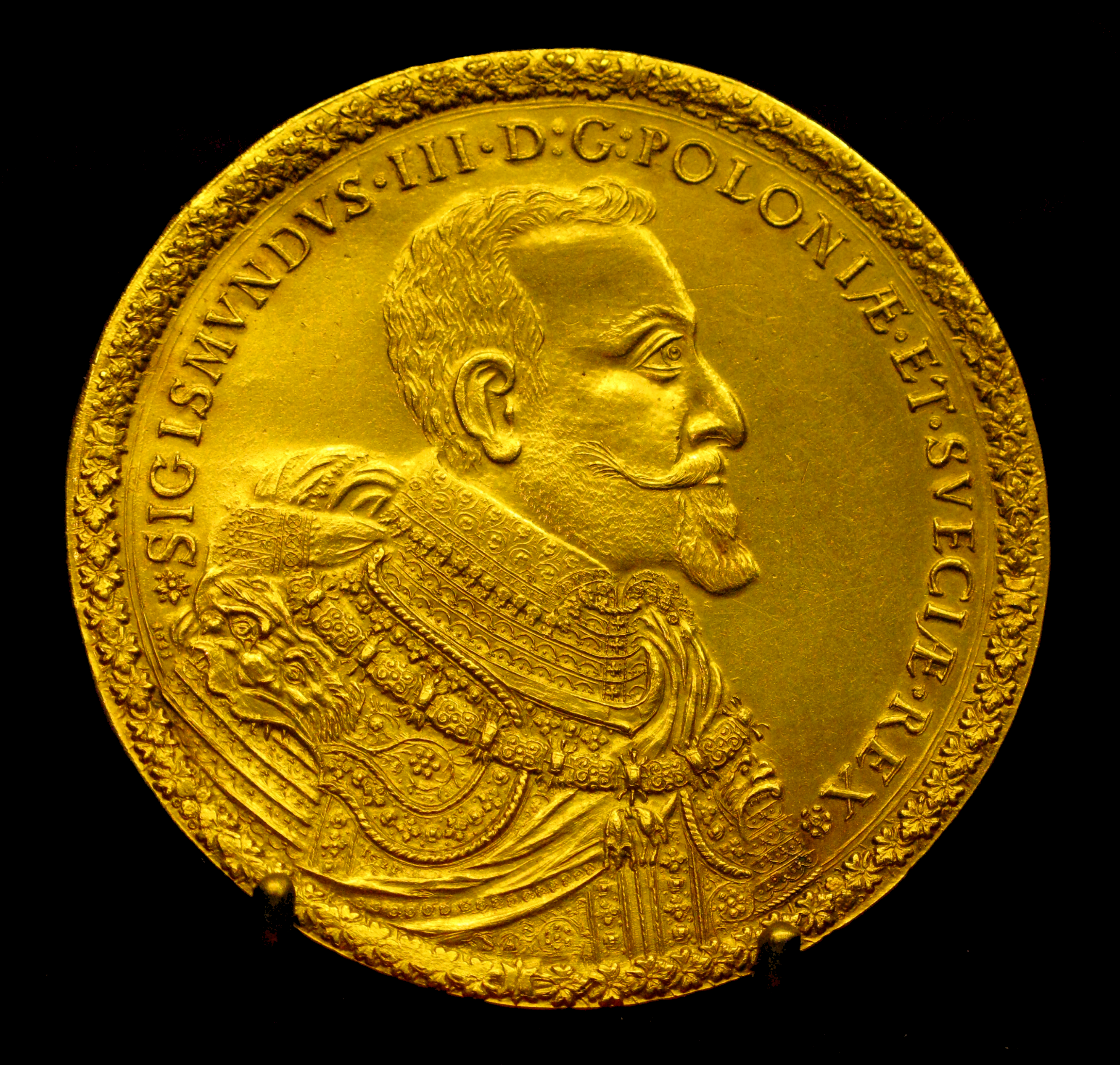
A Polish ducat, or red złoty, minted in 1621 during the reign of Sigismund III Vasa

Red złoty (Polish: czerwony złoty; also known as Polish ducats or florins) refers to circulating gold coins minted in the Kingdom of Poland (later, the Polish–Lithuanian Commonwealth) from 1526 to 1831. Whereas złoty "(adj.) gold(en)" could simply refer to the colour, czerwony (red) specified the material as gold.

== Background ==
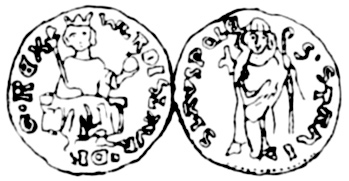
The first red złoty of Władysław I the Elbow-high, issued in the 1320s.

The earliest minting of Polish gold coins dates from the 14th century (1320s and 1330s) and the reign of Władysław I the Elbow-high. Władysław after becoming king initiated a reform of the monetary system based on similar policies that had been carried out in Hungary, where he had previously spent some years in exile. The coins issued by Władysław's mints were patterned after the ducats first produced by Charles I of Hungary. These were the first red złotys. Only one example has survived. No more gold coins were produced in Poland until the late 15th century and the reign of Alexander Jagiellon.

The red zloty was different from the Polish zloty proper, which was the money of account adopted during Alexander's reign in 1496. To combat the confusion and inflation resulting from the different coinage used in the Kingdom of Poland, Sigismund I the Old around 1526-1528 introduced further monetary reform, which included increased minting of the red złoty in Kraków. From 1528 the new monetary system was used in the Polish province of Royal Prussia, and in 1569 (following the Union of Lublin and the formation of the Commonwealth), in the Grand Duchy of Lithuania.

The last Polish red złoty were the so-called "insurgent ducats" minted at the Warsaw mint in 1831, on the eve of the November Uprising.

== Mint and value ==
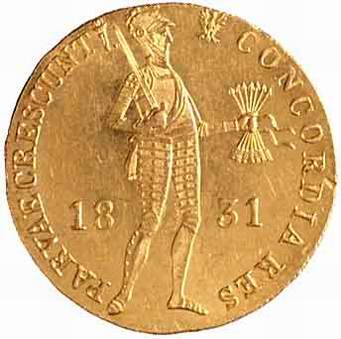
The last red złoty, the "insurgent ducat" of 1831

The red złoty was minted at 3.5 grams of gold. There was also a silver złoty, worth 23.1 grams of silver. In 1526 a monetary scale was introduced in which 1 złoty = 5 szóstaków (sixpences) = 10 trojaków (threepences) = 30 groszy (groschen) = 90 szelągów (shillings) = 180 ternarów/trzeciaków (ternarii) = 540 denarów (denarii).

The value of one red złoty in terms of accounting złotys increased in time, while at the same time the amount of silver found in the grosz decreased. for example, in the 16th century the red złoty's value rose from the initial 30 grosze to almost twice that in just a few decades; in the mid-17th century it was worth six accounting Polish złoty (180 groszy), while in late 18th century, one red złoty was worth about 18 Polish accounting złoty (or 540 groszy).

== See also ==
- Bimetallism
- Chervonets
- Copernicus Law
- Historical coins and banknotes of Poland
