= Alexey Ustaev =

Bukharian Jewish entrepreneur (born 1960)

Alexey Y. Ustaev
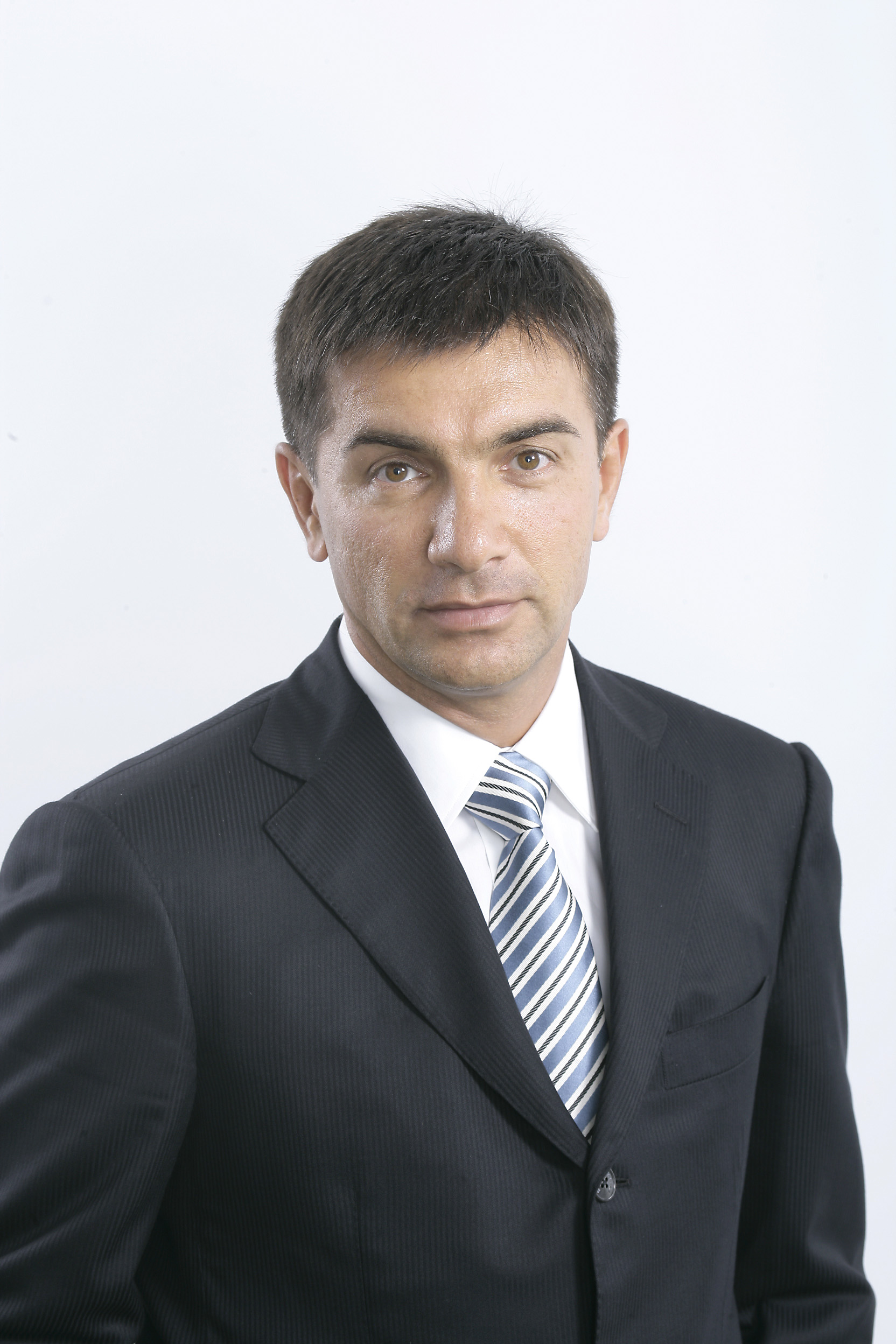
- Born: 12 April 1960 (age 66)
- Education: PhD in Economics, University of Economics and Finance

Ustaev Alexey Yakubovich is an Uzbekistani Bukharian Jewish entrepreneur, financier and investor. Since 1984, he has worked in Lenhydroenergospetstroy, and took part in the construction of complex of structures to protect the city from floods. In 1987, he commenced engagement in business activities, became director general of the Soviet-Swedish enterprise "Viking", and chairman of the cooperative "Vera". From1988 to 2014 he was Chairman of the Management Board of "Viking" Bank (until 1991 - "Patent" Cooperative Bank). From 2014 to 2023 he was President and Member of the Board of Directors of First Russian Commercial bank "Viking".

== Biography ==
Alexey Yakubovich Ustaev was born on April 12, 1960, in Tashkent. His father and mother were Bukharan Jews and educators. His mother, Ida Yusupovna Kandinova (1936–1980), was a teacher of Russian language and literature, deputy principal of School No. 125 in Tashkent, and director of the Nadezhda Krupskaya House of Pioneers.

On his maternal side, Alexey Ustaev is the grandson of Yosef Shalom Kandinov (1906–1978), an Uzbek educator, World War II veteran, enlightener, and public figure. Yosef Kandinov came from a family of Bukharan Jews: on his father's side from the Kandin family, and on his mother's side from the Kalontarov-Normatov family.

The Kandin family played a significant role in the history of the Jewish community of Bukhara. One of the most prominent members of this family was Aaron Moshe Kandin (1822–1909), a merchant, treasurer (Minister of Finance) of the Emirate of Bukhara, head of the Jewish community in the second half of the 19th century, philanthropist, and benefactor.

Through his grandfather Yosef Kandinov, Alexey Ustaev is a direct descendant of Aaron Kandin.

== Education ==
1982 – Graduated from the Tashkent Polytechnic Institute, with qualification as "Civil engineer".
1994 – Graduated from the Interdepartmental Institute of Professional Development at St. Petersburg, University of Economics and Finance, chosen field Finance and Credit, with a major specialization in "banking".
2004-2007 – Applicant seeking degree as Candidate in Economic Sciences at St. Petersburg University of Economics and Finance.
2007 – Defense of thesis on "Monitoring of Clients as a System Element of Bank Crediting", assignment of the scientific degree of Doctor of Economics.

== Creation of the first Russian commercial bank ==
In August 1988 the first private commercial bank of Russia – "Viking" - was created in St. Petersburg as an experiment. The bank was granted license No. 2 (the first license was obtained by a bank in Kazakhstan which went out of business in the 1990s). From this point on the era of formation of a banking system began in the New Russia Alexey Ustaev hired statesmen as Anatoly Kurkov (former head of a central board of the Ministry of Internal Affairs in Leningrad), Valery Zaborov (the former assistant prosecutor in the Leningrad region), Nikolay Sergeyenko (the former deputy chief of city tax inspection), Leonid Perekrestov (major general of the Municipal Department of Internal Affairs of St. Petersburg), Victor Halansky (the founder of the modern banking system in St. Petersburg, from 1990 to 1996 the chief of the Main Department of the Central Bank of RSFSR in Leningrad and St. Petersburg) and other outstanding people. From the moment of creation of Viking Bank, Alexey Ustaev defined the main principles of activity as an active work within the real sector of the economy, complete refusal of risky operations and an individual approach to each client.

== Work with the industrial enterprises ==
The main activity of Alexey Ustaev is the work within the sphere of investment financing of enterprises in the real sector of the economy. Inside Viking Bank, Alexey Ustaev developed its own unique system of service for corporate clients – the industrial enterprises – for the purpose of protection of the business against external risks. The two-tiered model includes a professional team of experts for financial profiles working in Viking Bank and also highly specialized companies, which were especially created and attracted on the terms of outsourcing the rendering of legal, economic, tax, consulting, IT, business maintenance services, both ensuring economic safety and insurance of the enterprises, and also a bank which conducts monitoring of the borrower, not only at the stage of issuing of loans, but also during the course of implementation of the business plan in changing market conditions, for which it was organized. This system allowed Viking Bank to introduce a new approach with the organization and regulation of the process of lending to companies. The bank refused to play a passive role as the provider of borrowed funds and became instead a full partner interested in the improvement of the financial position and expansion of the business of its clients. The bank carries out active work for enterprises in light industry, hotel business, trade and services sectors, development sectors and other branches of the economy.

== Public and social work ==
Since 1999 - Member of the Diplomatic Club
Since 2004 - Academician of the St. Petersburg Engineering Academy
2004-2006 – President of the St. Petersburg Chess Federation
Since 2007 - President of the Association of the Chess Federations of the Northwest Federal District

The Viking bank led by Alexey Ustaev actively participates in various social programs, it provides help to socially disadvantaged segments of the population, and it supports the development of sports, science and education.

1995-2009 - payments of grants to families of disabled people who have to look after minor children, and later to families of disabled people.

Since 2004 - financial support of the Ballet Drama School of L.V. Jakobson and Orphanage No. 8 of the Vyborgsky District of St. Petersburg.

2004-2006 – Alexey Ustaev actively develops chess activities, being the president of the St. Petersburg Chess Federation.

Since 2006 – financial help to the Turner Children's Orthopedic Research Institute and to the K.K. Grota Boarding School for Blind and Visually Impaired Children.

Since 2007 - Alexey Ustaev was elected president of the Association of Chess Federations of the Northwest Federal District of Russia. The association unites chess federations from 10 regions of the Northwest and is one of the largest chess associations in Russia. With Alexey Ustaev's financial and organizational support, sporting events of various levels – from children's competitions to tournaments of veterans, the championships of Russia, large international competitions to participation of the most successful chess players are held.

Since 2008 – charitable help to Orphanage No. 6 of the Primorsky District of St. Petersburg.

Since 2009 - under the patronage of Alexey Ustaev, the Chess School Northwest Federal District successfully works with the participation of the grand masters Evgeniy Solozhenkin and Alexey Shirov.
Since 2011 Alexey Ustaev founded bank scholarships for gifted students of leading economic HIGHER EDUCATIONAL INSTITUTIONS of St. Petersburg.

Since 2011 help is given to the Regional Children's Clinical Hospital, the Volosovsky Regional Orphanage No. 1, and the shelter "Baby".

In 2011 Viking Bank represented by its chairman of the board, A.Y. Ustaev, was awarded the gratitude of the Governor of St. Petersburg, Valentina Matviyenko, for its active participation in charity and the promotion of programs benefiting children.

== Awards ==
Award of the President of the Slovak Republic "Honorable Cross", 2nd degree.
Medal "300th Anniversary of St. Petersburg".
National Award in the field of management "Best Leader of Russia".
International Award of the European Assembly of Business for "United Europe" for the personal contribution towards European integration.
Public award of the Main and All-Russian Award "Russian National Olympus" — "For honor and valor".
Award "The Best Leader of Russia".
Honorary title "Top Manager of the Russian Federation 2007".
Medal of the St. Petersburg Chamber of Commerce and Industry "For distinction in business development".
Award of the Russian Banking Association "Manager of the Year in the Banking Sphere" ("For the personal contribution to the development of the banking system").
A.M.Gorchakov silver medal of the Ministry of Foreign Affairs "For the contribution to strengthening the peace and the development of international cooperation". Awarded as an acknowledgement of the merits of strengthening the peace and the development of international cooperation, the statement of universal ideals, and humanitarian values.
Award of the Russian Banking Association 2013 awarded to Alexey Ustaev - National bank award "Banker of the Year".
The highest award of Northwest Banking Association ("Banker’s Star").
Honorary title "Honored banker" (the highest award of the Russian Banking Association).
State award of the Slovak Republic "For significant contribution to the reputation of the Slovak Republic abroad"

== Publications ==
- A.Y. Ustaev, "By nationality we are Russians, by ideology we are professionals" (N. Krotov "The Birth of Commercial Banks. Witnessed by participants", Moscow, "Banking business", 1998).
- A.Y. Ustaev, "The First Commercial Bank of the New Russia" (Space. Information. New technologies, No. 1, 1999).
- A.Y. Ustaev, "We believed the state" (N. Krotov. Archival Depository of the Russian financial and bank revolution (1985 — 1995). Attestations by eye-witnesses. Documents. T. 2 . M.: "Triada, Ltd.", 2001)
- A.Y. Ustaev, "Monitoring the financial condition of clients in a controlled system of credit risks of the bank" (monograph "Banking System of Russia — from Stabilization to Efficiency" under the editorship of G. N. Beloglazova, N. A. Savinskaya, St. Petersburg, St. Petersburg State University of Economics and Finance, 2003).
- A.Y. Ustaev, "The Principles of Carrying Out Monitoring of Borrowers in a Controlled System of Credit Risks of Banks" (Collection of scientific reports. "Economy and Management", Part 2, under the editorship of A. E. Karlik, St. Petersburg, St. Petersburg State University of Economics and Finance, 2005).
- A. Y. Ustaev, "Banks as active subjects of industrial policy" (Collection of reports "Market strategy: Russia-Germany", Part 2, St. Petersburg, St. Petersburg State University of Economics and Finance, 2005).
- A. Y. Ustaev, "We believed the state" (N. I. Krotov. Archival Depository of the Russian financial and bank revolution. (Attestations of eyewitnesses. Documents) Volume 2. / Second edition, revised and expanded. — M.: Economic chronicle, Agency of financial information of "MZ-media", 2006).
- A. Y. Ustaev, "Technologies of bank lending in conditions of an unstable economy" (Collection of materials of "The second international scientific conference. Russia and Poland", St. Petersburg. St. Petersburg State University of Economics and Finance, 2007).
- A. Y. Ustaev, "Relationship of banks with problem borrowers" ("Finance, Loans and International Relations in the 21st Century", Volume 2, St. Petersburg. St. Petersburg State University of Economics and Finance, 2007).
- A. Y. Ustaev, "Monitoring of clients as an element of a bank lending system" ("Finance and credit", No. 15, 2007).
- A. Y. Ustaev, "On the assessment of efficiency of bank mediation in lending" (Collection "The financial market and the lending system of Russia. Release No. 8", St. Petersburg, in "Info-da", 2008).
- A. Y. Ustaev, "Medium and small banks in the Russian banking system" (Collection of materials: "XIX Congress of ARB", Moscow: "Kvartet-Press", 2008).
- A. Y. Ustaev, "In St. Petersburg the creation of the Viking Bank - the modern Russian banking system" (N. Krotov "History of the Soviet bank reform during the 1980s. First commercial banks", Moscow, Autonomous Non-Commercial Organization "Economic Chronicles", 2008).
