= State Bank of the USSR =

Central and only bank of the Soviet Union

State Bank of the USSR Государственный банк СССР

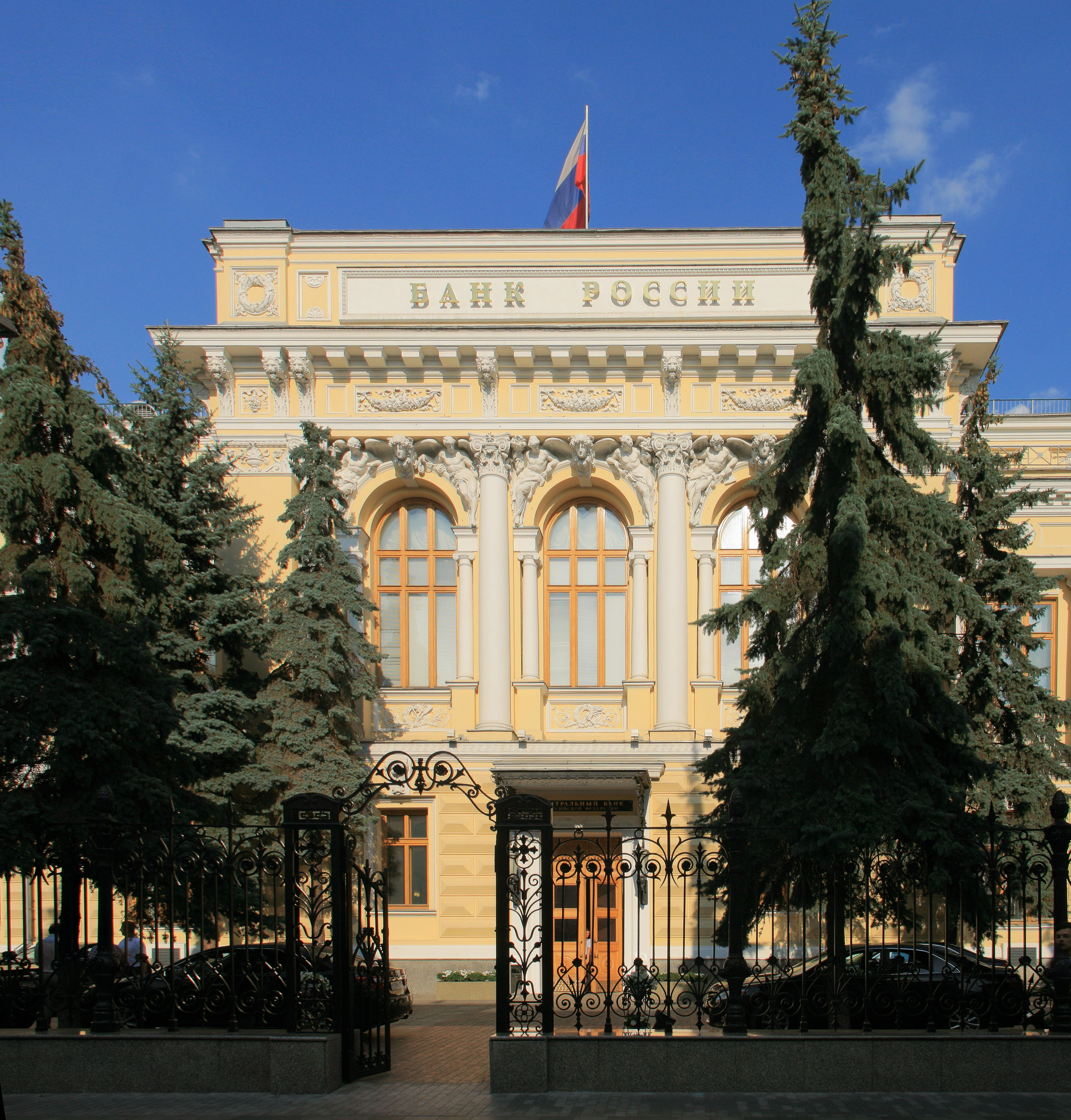
- Former head office of the Gosbank in Moscow, originally the branch of the State Bank of the Russian Empire
- Central bank of: Soviet Union
- Headquarters: 12 Neglinnaya str., Moscow, Soviet Union
- Established: October 1921; 105 years ago
- Dissolved: 1 March 1992; 34 years ago
- Currency: Soviet ruble SUR (ISO 4217)
- Preceded by: State Bank of the Russian Empire
- Succeeded by: Central Bank of Russia

The State Bank of the USSR (Russian: Государственный банк СССР, romanized: Gosudarstvennyy bank SSSR), known as the State Bank of the RSFSR from 1921 to 1923, and commonly referred to as Gosbank (Russian: Госбанк), was the central bank and main component of the single-tier banking system of the Soviet Union. It replaced the State Bank of the Russian Empire, and following the dissolution of the Soviet Union, it became the Central Bank of Russia in 1992 (with Gosbank ceasing to exist).

Gosbank was one of the three main Soviet economic authorities, the other two being Gosplan (the State Planning Committee) and Gossnab (the State Committee for Material Technical Supply). It closely collaborated with the Soviet Ministry of Finance to prepare the national state budget.

== History ==
The foundation of the bank was part of the implementation of the New Economic Policy (NEP), following the monetary dislocation and barter economy during the Russian Civil War. On 3 October 1921, the All-Russian Central Executive Committee passed a resolution for the founding of the State Bank of the Russian Soviet Federative Socialist Republic, followed by a similar resolution passed by the Council of People's Commissars on 10 October 1921 and a statute passed by the Central Committee on 13 October 1921 which stipulated that the State Bank was part of the Ministry of Finance (Narkomfin). It began operations on 16 November 1921. In February 1922, Vladimir Lenin derided the State Bank as "a bureaucratic paper game", comparing it to a Potemkin village in a letter to the bank’s head Aron Sheinman whom he accused of "Communist-mandarin childishness".

The State Bank presided over the two successive devaluations of the ruble, in 1922 (1 for 10,000) and 1923 (1 for 100). Meanwhile, on 11 October 1922 it was granted the right to issue the gold-backed chervonets or gold ruble that brought an end to the early Soviet hyperinflation. In 1923, it took its permanent name as State Bank of the USSR. In 1924 the State Bank produced its first consolidated credit plan, and formed the Committee on Banks to oversee the sectoral banks that had been created under the NEP. In 1925, it took over the previously separate cash holding system of Narkomfin.

The subsequent phase of Soviet central planning and phasing-out of the NEP led to the State Bank being granted a monopoly over short-term bank credit in 1927, and over all short-term credit in 1930 after mutual and direct commercial credit was terminated. In 1928-1930, the local branches of other banks were brought under the State Bank or closed, so that Prombank, Tsekombank or Selkhozbank subsequently operated largely through the State Bank's local offices. That phase of reform was completed in 1932, after which the division of labor between the State Bank and the other components of the Soviet banking system remained broadly stable until the late 1980s.

In 1931 Boris Berlatsky, a senior official of the State Bank was put on trial for wrecking as part of the 1931 Menshevik Trial.

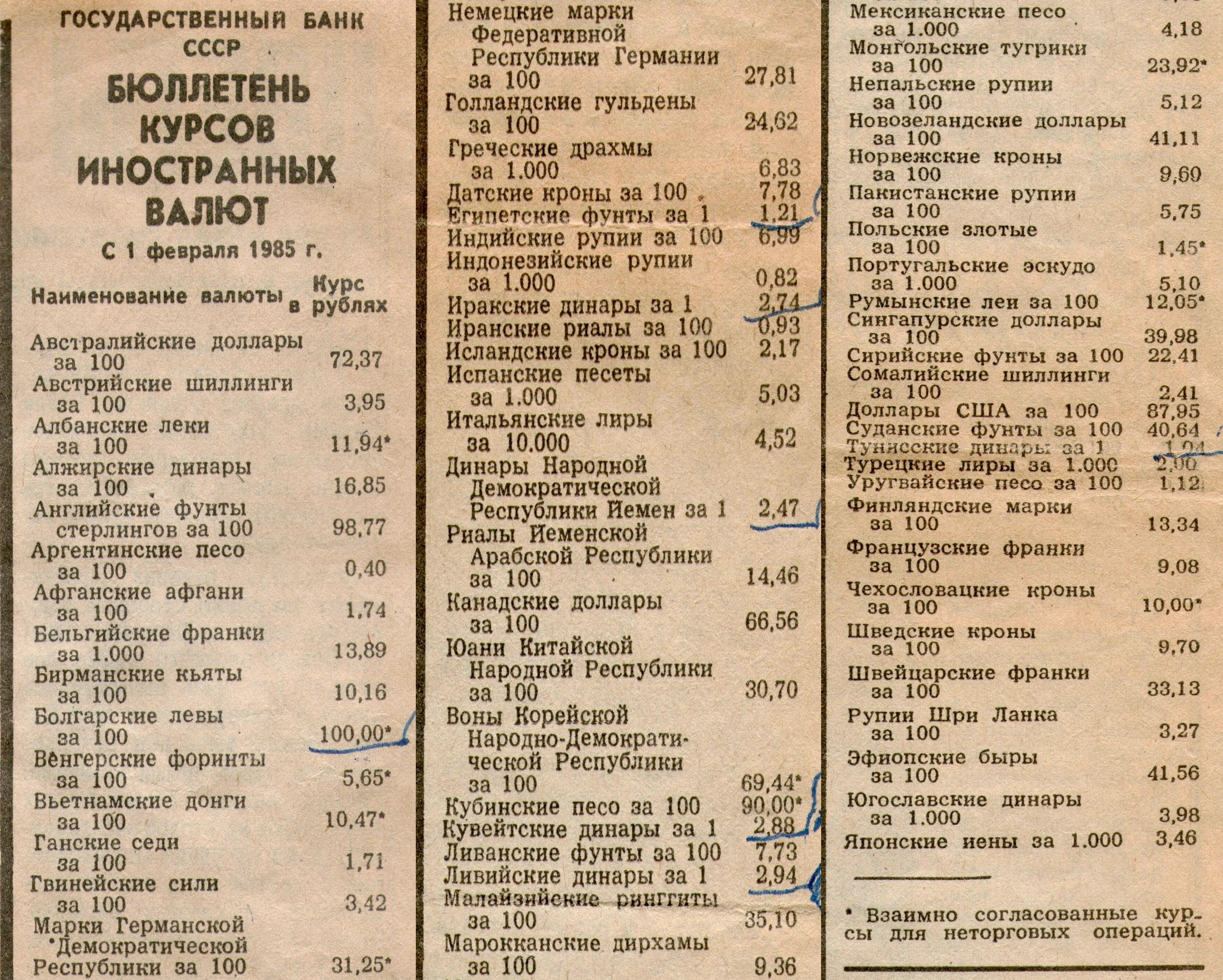
Exchange rate between the Soviet ruble and major world currencies, February 1985

Following aggressive monetary expansion during World War II, the monetary reform of 1947 resulted in another round of devaluation (1 for 10) and related confiscatory measures. In 1959, the consolidation of the specialized long-term credit banks into the Construction Bank of the USSR resulted in the assumption of some former operations of Selkhozbank, Tsekombank and municipal banks by the State Bank. The monetary reform of 1961 introduced another round of devaluation (1 for 10). In 1963, the State Bank's control over the system was further strengthened as it took over the State Labor Savings Banks System from the Soviet Ministry of Finance.

The Soviet state used the State Bank primarily as a tool to impose centralized control upon industry in general, using bank balances and transaction histories to monitor the activity of individual concerns and their compliance with five-year plans and directives. The State Bank never acted as a commercial bank aiming at profit maximization, but purely as an instrument of government policy. Instead of independently and impartially assessing the creditworthiness of the borrower, Gosbank would provide loan funds to individuals, groups and industries as directed by the central government.

In the 1970s, the State Bank was involved in the creation of Ost-West Handelsbank in Frankfurt (1971), Donau Bank in Vienna (1974), and East-West United Bank in Luxembourg (1974) together with the Foreign Trade Bank of the USSR.

The Law on the State Enterprise, introduced in June 1987, represented a significant attempt to impose financial accountability and autonomy on state enterprises. Bank reforming officially began on 1 January 1988 when Gosbank was dismantled to create a two-tier banking system. Mikhail Gorbachev divided Gosbank into a central bank and state-owned specialized banks (spetsbanks). These included Agroprombank and Zhilsotsbank, while Stroybank became Promstroybank. The government continued to direct credit policy, but Gosbank was now able to set interest rates on credit in coordination with Gosplan and the Ministry of Finance.

In March 1989, the Council of Ministers of the Soviet Union passed a resolution making the spetsbanks responsible for their own financing of operations, known as khozraschet, as policymakers had thought that this would give the spetsbanks a profit motive; however, this only increased tensions between the spetsbanks and Gosbank as the latter retained control over credit resources. Following the appointment of Viktor Gerashchenko as the director of Gosbank, it played a key role in the creation of a parallel banking system as Gerashchenko viewed the early spetsbank reforms as insufficient.

In September 1990, the Soviet government permitted the specialized banks that had emerged from Gosbank to "commercialize" themselves, which quickly led to the splintering of the centralized system. As both the governments of the Soviet Union and Russian SFSR had not created the institutional groundwork for this process, this led to the emergence of hundreds of small banks and a few large centralized banking systems.

=== Demise ===
Following the election of Boris Yeltsin as chairman of the Supreme Soviet of Russia and the elections of the Congress of People's Deputies of Russia in March 1990, the Russian republic sought to distance itself from the central government and on 12 June, it declared state sovereignty. In July, the government of the Russian SFSR formed the Central Bank of Russia (CBR) from the Russian republic's branch of Gosbank. The government had sought to create a counterweight to Gosbank during the struggle for state sovereignty. In October, it created Vneshtorgbank Russia as its own foreign trade bank. In December, the Law on the Central Bank and the Law on Banks and Banking Activity was passed in the Russian republic, which formalized the CBR's independence.

In December 1990, Soviet prime minister Valentin Pavlov and Gosbank director Viktor Gerashchenko responded to the Russian SFSR's passage of sovereign banking laws by validating all 50 and 100 ruble notes in circulation from the following month. As the Bank of Russia was not informed, the public's trust in Gosbank was greatly damaged. The Soviet republics stopped paying most taxes to the central government, and in March 1991, Gosbank estimated that only seven billion rubles of expected tax revenue had been remitted by the republics, out of a total of 23.4 billion rubles. Deputy Premier Grigory Yavlinsky advocated for the creation of a "banking union", namely a formal monetary union among the Soviet republics, in the New Union Treaty, but that attempt rapidly foundered in the second half of 1991.

Gosbank and the CBR continued to operate in parallel until the August Coup. On 23 August, Russian president Boris Yeltsin ordered the Council of Ministers of the Soviet Union to finish the transfer of Union-level organizations within the Russian SFSR to the government of the Russian SFSR by the end of the year. Andrei Zverev was appointed by the government of the Russian SFSR as the temporary director of Gosbank, although Gerashchenko did not submit his resignation until 26 December. On 15 November, Yeltsin took over the Ministry of Finance of the USSR and Goznak. After the signing of the Belovezh Accords, the Presidium of the Supreme Soviet of Russia passed a resolution transferring Gosbank's "facilities, documents, and specialists" to the Bank of Russia, and on 1 January 1992, it took over the rest of Gosbank's resources in Russia, after which Gosbank officially ceased to exist.

== Leadership ==
The following is a list of the governors of the Board of the State Bank. The governor was appointed by the Premier of the Soviet Union.

Name (governor)	Photo	Term of office		Appointed by
Name (governor)	Photo	Start of term	End of term	Appointed by
Aron Sheinman (1885–1944)		1921	1924	Vladimir Lenin
Nikolai Tumanov (1887–1936)		March 5, 1924	January 16, 1926	Alexei Rykov
Aron Sheinman (1885–1944)		1926	1929	Alexei Rykov
Georgy Pyatakov (1890–1937)		April 19, 1929	October 18, 1930	Alexei Rykov
Moissei Kalmanovich (1888–1937)		October 18, 1930	April 4, 1934	Vyacheslav Molotov
Lev Maryasin (1894–1938)		April 4, 1934	July 14, 1936	Vyacheslav Molotov
Solomon Kruglikov (1899–1938)		July 14, 1936	September 15, 1937	Vyacheslav Molotov
Alexey Grichmanov (1896–1939)		September 15, 1937	July 16, 1938	Vyacheslav Molotov
Nikolai Bulganin (1895–1975)		October 2, 1938	April 17, 1940	Vyacheslav Molotov
Nikolai K. Sokolov (1896–1941)		April 17, 1940	October 12, 1940	Vyacheslav Molotov
Nikolai Bulganin (1895–1975)		October 12, 1940	May 23, 1945	Joseph Stalin
Yakov Golev (1894–1960)		May 23, 1945	March 23, 1948	Joseph Stalin
Vasily Popov (1903–1964)		March 23, 1948	March 31, 1958	Joseph Stalin
Nikolai Bulganin (1895–1975)		March 31, 1958	August 15, 1958	Nikita Khrushchev
Alexander Korovushkin (1909–1976)		August 15, 1958	August 14, 1963	Nikita Khrushchev
Alexey Poskonov (1904–1969)		1963	1969	Nikita Khrushchev
Miefodiy Svieshnikov (1911–1981)		1969	1976	Alexei Kosygin
Vladimir Alkhimov (1919–1993)		October 11, 1976	January 10, 1986	Alexei Kosygin
Viktor Dementsev (1918–2010)		January 10, 1986	August 22, 1987	Nikolai Ryzhkov
Nikolai Garetovsky (1926–2023)		August 22, 1987	June 7, 1989	Nikolai Ryzhkov
Viktor Gerashchenko (1937–2025)		June 7, 1989	August 26, 1991	Valentin Pavlov
Andrei Zverev (born 1955)		August 26, 1991	December 20, 1991	Ivan Silayev

== Gallery ==
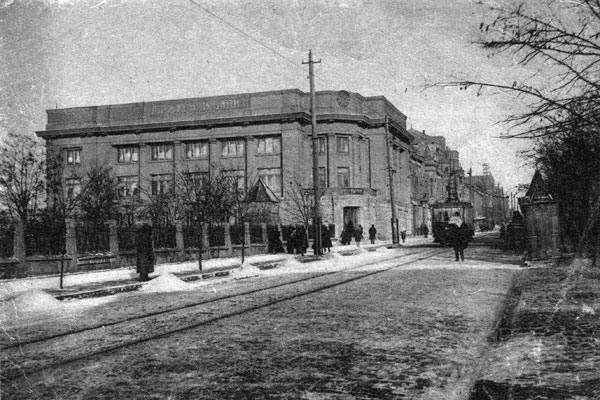
Branch building in Stalino (later Donetsk), shortly after inauguration in 1928

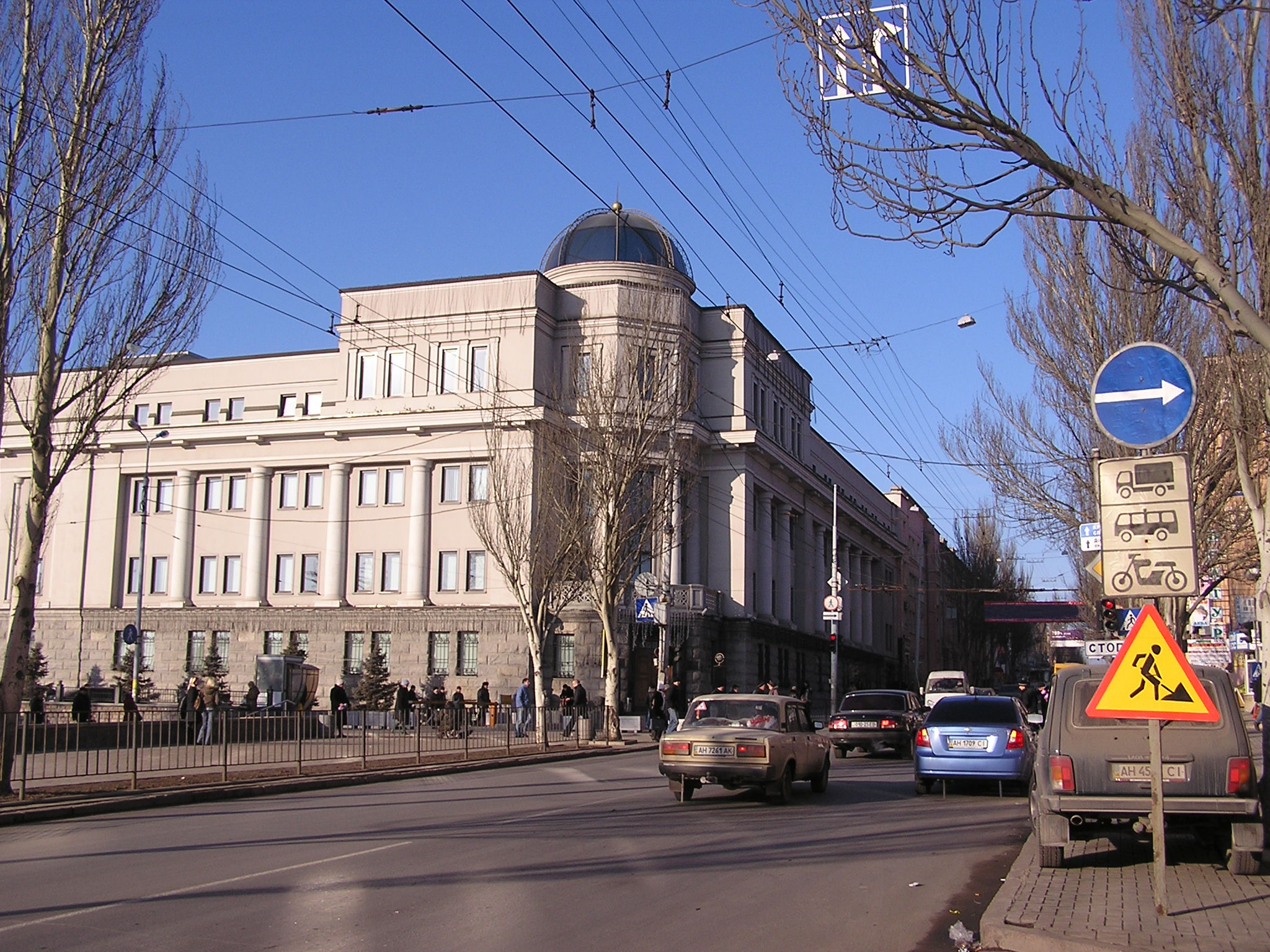
The same building in 2008

== See also ==
- Economy of the Soviet Union
- Banking in the Soviet Union
- List of central banks

== Sources ==
- Goldenweiser, Alexis (1925). "Banking and Currency Reform in Russia". Journal of Political Economy. 33 (2): 234–243.
- Johnson, Juliet (5 September 2018). A Fistful of Rubles: The Rise and Fall of the Russian Banking System. Cornell University Press. ISBN 978-1-5017-3131-0.
