= Aaron Kandin =

Financial minister to the emirs of Bukhara

Aaron Moshe Kandin
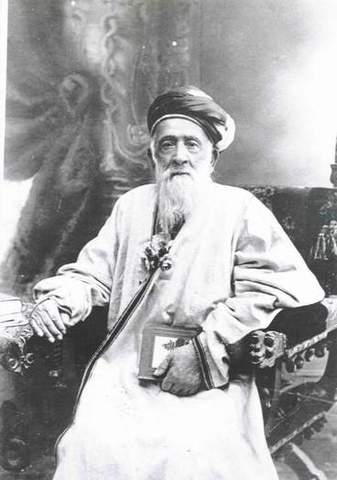
- Born: 1822; Bukhara, (Bukhara Emirate)
- Died: May 20, 1906; Jerusalem, (Ottoman Empire)
- Resting place: Jerusalem
- Citizenship: Bukhara Emirate → Russian Empire
- Occupations: Merchant, Financier, Philanthropist
- Years active: 19th – early 20th century
- Organization(s): Jewish Community of Bukhara, Bukhara Emirate, Bukharan Jewish Community of Jerusalem
- Title: Merchant of the 2nd Guild

Aaron Kandin (1822, Bukhara – 20 July 1909, Jerusalem) was a wealthy Bukharan merchant, financial minister to the emirs of Bukhara, and leader of the Bukharan Jewish community who became an important figure among Jerusalem's Bukharan Jews and a noted philanthropist.

== Early years ==
Aaron Moshe Kandin was born in 1822 in Bukhara to a Jewish family. His father, Moshe Kandin, was an educated and influential man. He served as elder (kalontar) and judge (qazi-kalon) in the Bukharan Jewish community and held important positions at the court of Emir Muzaffar: he was a tax collector (zakotchi) and finance minister (vizier). The father significantly influenced his son's upbringing, imparting to him knowledge of religion, commerce, and state administration.

Aaron Kandin received a traditional Jewish education in a heder (elementary religious school). From a young age, he showed an aptitude for crafts and commerce. He invented a colorfast dye for silk, which became the foundation of his successful business. His father purchased a dye workshop for him, launching Aaron on his path to becoming a prosperous merchant. From his earliest years, he took an active part in Jewish community life. After his father's death, he inherited his honorary positions and became head of the family.

He was elected kalontar (community elder), which enabled him to take charge of administrative and social matters - including tax collection, dispute resolution, and representing Jewish interests before the authorities. An educated and pragmatic man, Kandin earned respect among both community members and local authorities, eventually becoming an advisor to the Bukhara Emirate's chief tax collector (zakotchi).

== Political activity and arrest ==
Following the Bukhara Emir's defeat in the 1868 war with the Russian Empire, Aaron Kandin found himself at the center of political intrigue. The Jewish community was forced to raise a substantial sum to pay Russia's war indemnity. Amid internal community conflict, Kandin was accused of spying for the Russians - leading to his arrest and property confiscation. Sentenced to death, he was offered a last-minute reprieve by the Emir through conversion to Islam. Kandin accepted, paying a ransom of 3,400 Bukharan tillas. His conversion ceremony included the Emir personally presenting him with an ornate brocade robe and turban.

== Service at the Emir's Court ==
After his release, Aaron Kandin was appointed treasurer at the Emir’s court. In this role, he influenced Bukhara’s economic development while serving as a key intermediary between the Jewish community and the authorities. The Emir housed him within the palace walls—a gesture that afforded Kandin both protection and status, yet effectively placed him under house arrest. Despite his official conversion to Islam, he maintained secret ties with the Jewish community. For six years, he continued practicing Jewish rites in secret, established a clandestine synagogue, and supported Bukhara’s Jews by providing aid. Though restricted in his movements, Kandin became a vital conduit, smuggling out reports about the community’s plight and serving as their lifeline to the outside world. Kandin also relayed intelligence about Bukhara's political situation to Russian diplomats through Hillel Benenson, a traveler and merchant. His motivation for aiding the Russians ran deep. Facing oppressive restrictions, legal insecurity, and brutal punishments, Bukharan Jews increasingly pinned their hopes on the emirate's conquest by a European power. After the death of Emir Muzaffar in 1885, the new ruler of Bukhara became Abdulahad, who was a friend of Kandin`s son Yosef. This strengthened his position at court and allowed him to recover part of his confiscated property. This privileged position allowed Kandin to travel beyond Bukhara for financial transactions while continuing to manage the emirate's economy. In 1887, he secured Russian citizenship, gaining protection from the Empire.

== The Emigration and Life in Russia ==
In 1888, Kandin, accompanied by his son Yosef, fled to Russian Turkestan and subsequently relocated to Moscow. There, he registered under the surname Kandinov and joined the Second Merchant Guild. However, dissatisfied with life in Moscow, he moved to Samarkand in 1889. In Samarkand, he became a member of the city's Second Merchant Guild and acquired property. Kandin never returned to Bukhara and later obtained official permission to emigrate to Jerusalem.

== Life in Jerusalem ==
In the mid-1890s, Aaron Kandin settled in Jerusalem, purchasing a large house from a Turkish official. He also built a house in the Bukharan Jewish quarter of Rehovot, a synagogue, and an elderly care home. In Jerusalem, he took an active part in the life of the Bukharan Jewish community, preserving traditions and promoting the development of educational and charitable institutions. He established contacts with the Russian consul, which helped Bukharan Jews resolve legal matters Shortly before his death, Kandin bequeathed a large portion of his estate to charity, including aid to orphans. He died on July 20, 1909, in Jerusalem.

== Legacy ==
Aaron Kandin left a significant mark on the history of Bukharan Jews. His activities contributed to preserving Jewish traditions, improving the community's situation in both Bukhara and Jerusalem. He played an important role in the economic and political life of 19th-century Bukhara, as well as in strengthening the Bukharan Jewish community in Palestine.
