= Prombank =

Former Soviet bank

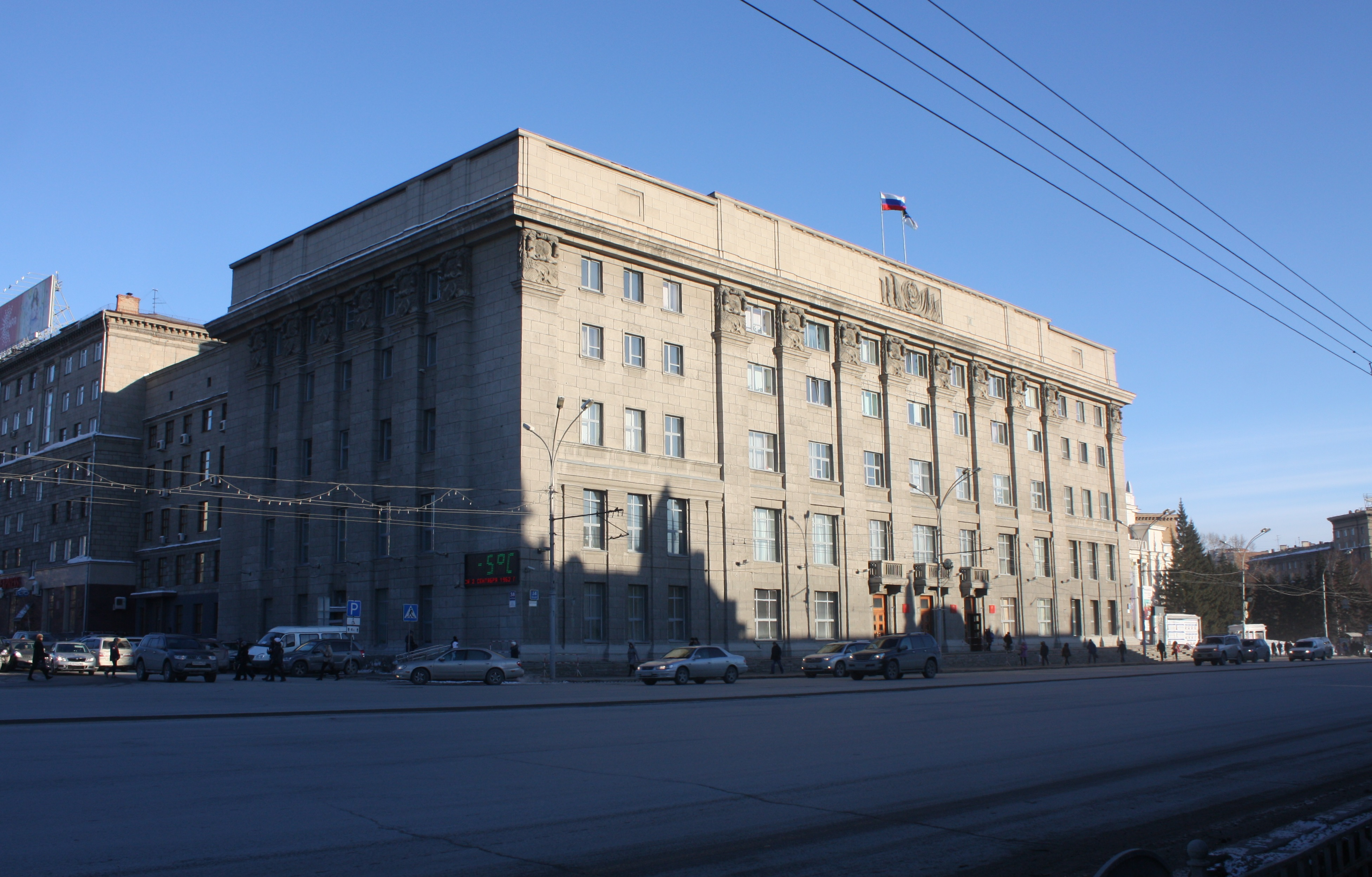
- Former Prombank building on Lenin Square, Novosibirsk, later repurposed as City Hall
- Company type: State owned company
- Industry: Financial services
- Founded: September 1, 1922
- Defunct: 1959
- Fate: Merged
- Successor: Construction Bank of the USSR
- Headquarters: Soviet Union
- Area served: Soviet Union
- Key people: Alexander Krasnoshchyokov (first leader)
- Products: Loans
- Owner: Government of the Soviet Union

Prombank (Russian: Промбанк for Промышленный банк, lit. 'Industrial Bank') was the shorthand name for a series of significant institutions within the Soviet banking system between 1922 and 1959, when Prombank was merged with Selkhozbank (Agricultural Bank) and Tsekombank (Residential Construction Bank) to form the Construction Bank of the USSR, or Stroybank.

== History ==
The Russian Trade and Industrial Bank (Russian: Российский торгово-промышленный банк) was established on 1 September 1922 under the New Economic Policy (NEP). On 7 December 1922, another specialized bank was established as Elektrokredit (Электрокредит), a joint-stock company. On 13 August 1924 the former was renamed the Trade and Industrial Bank of the USSR (Торгово-промышленный банк СССР), and on 29 October 1924 the latter was reorganized as the Bank for the Electrification of the USSR or Elektrobank (Электробанк).

On 27 June 1928, Prombank absorbed Elektrobank and became the Industry and Electrification Long-Term Credit Bank of the USSR (Банк долгосрочного кредитования промышленности и электрохозяйства СССР), still known as Prombank. In 1932 it was again renamed, as the Finance Bank of Capital Construction in Industry, Transport, Posts and Telegraphs.

The Prombank was initially led by Alexander Krasnoshchyokov from 24 October 1922 to 18 September 1923, then by Vladimir Ksandrov from 12 October 1923 to 13 March 1927.

== See also ==
- Banking in the Soviet Union
