= Vladimir Ksandrov =

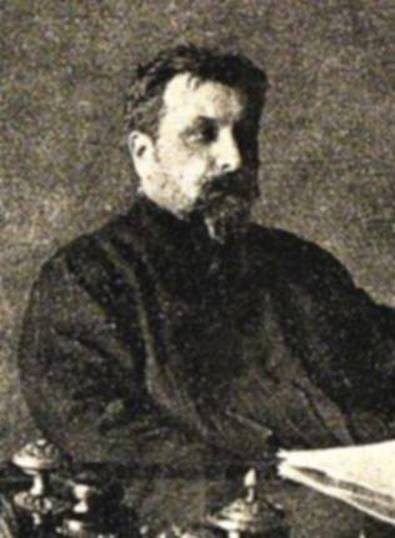
Image of Vladimir Nikolaevich Ksandrov

Vladimir Nikolaevich Ksandrov (Russian: Владимир Николаевич Ксандров) (January 12, 1877 ((O.S.)December 31, 1876) – 1942) was a Soviet politician, Old Bolshevik, and economist.

Member of the RSDLP since 1904.

Important posts include:

- member of the Presidium of VSNKh (1923–1929)
- chairman of the Main Concession Committee (1927–1929)
- chairman of the Supreme Technical Council of the Peoples' Commissariat of Communications (1931)

In 1938 he was arrested and placed in Gulag labor camps, later sentenced again in 1941. The sentence quoted "overspending of one million 120 thousand roubles". Since he was in put charge of construction works due to his expertise, it was suggested that he overestimated the amount of work done by the gulag inmates, thus probably saving many lives.
