= Sovznak =

Sovznaks (Russian: совзнаки, IPA: [sɐˈvznakʲɪ]) were promissory notes issued in Soviet Russia in 1919 and used during 1919–1924. The name is an abbreviation of the expression "Sovetskiye znaki" (Советские знаки, Soviet tokens), which in its turn was an abbreviation of the official terms (советские казначейские знаки, расчётные знаки РСФСР, денежные знаки РСФСР (СССР) ) used during different periods. They were the de facto money of the time. The term "token" was a euphemism for "money", since communism was supposed to abolish money, and sovznaks were considered to be a temporary, transitional instrument.

== See also ==
- Chervonets#Soviet Union
