= Construction Bank of the USSR =

Former Soviet bank

- Native name: Всесоюзный банк финансирования капитальных вложений
- Formerly: All-Union Bank for Financing Capital Investments
- Company type: State-owned Joint-Stock Company
- Industry: Financial services
- Predecessors: Prombank, Tsekombank, and Selkhozbank
- Founded: 1959; 67 years ago in Moscow, USSR
- Founder: Soviet Ministry of Finance
- Defunct: 1988
- Fate: Split into different entities during the dissolution of the USSR
- Successor: Promstoybank
- Headquarters: Moscow, Russia
- Number of locations: 1,500 branches
- Area served: Soviet Union
- Products: Development loans, business loans
- Owner: Soviet Union

The Construction Bank of the USSR (Russian: Всесоюзный банк финансирования капитальных вложений), in shorthand Stroybank (sometimes Stroibank), was a Soviet development bank that was a significant part of the Soviet banking system. Stroybank was formed in 1959 and took over the operations of several prior specialized development banks, namely Prombank (est. 1922, trade and industry), Tsekombank (est. 1925, residential construction), and Selkhozbank (est. 1932, agriculture).

In 1988, it was restructured as the State Commercial Industrial and Construction Bank of the USSR (Russian: Государственный коммерческий Промышленно-строительный банк СССР) or Promstroybank, with some operations spun off as the Agro-Industrial Bank (Russian: Агропромышленный банк СССР or Agroprombank) and Bank of Housing, Communal Services and Social Development (Russian: Банк жилищно-коммунального хозяйства и социального развития СССР or Zhilsotsbank). These institutions, together with the reorganized Sberbank and Vnesheconombank, became known as the five specialized banks or spetsbanki.

== History ==
The Construction Bank was formed in 1959 with operations formerly of the Prombank, Tsekombank, and Selkhozbank as well as the Petrograd Communal Bank (Russian: Петроградский коммунальный банк) which had been formed in 1923 from former operations of the Volga-Kama Commercial Bank. It provided long-term credit to industry alongside the Gosbank. It was initially under the Ministry of Finance, but in 1961 was placed under the direct jurisdiction of the Council of Ministers of the Soviet Union. Between 1960 and 1975, the number of its local outlets across the Soviet territory grew from 746 to 1,500.

Following the dissolution of the Soviet Union, Promstroybank's operations were reorganized into different entities in the different post-Soviet states, for example Belpromstroybank in Belarus, the Estonian Commercial Bank of Industry and Construction (ETEK), Industriyabank in Georgia, Turan Bank in Kazakhstan, Moldindconbank in Moldova, Prominvestbank in Ukraine, and Uzpromstroybank in Uzbekistan.

In 1997, the Russian Promstroybank became the first Russian bank to enter the United States market, but Promstoybank was severely affected by the Russian financial crisis of the late 1990s. In April 2004, the Bank of Russia put Promstoybank under administration. In 2005, Vneshtorgbank acquired a majority stake of 75% plus three shares in Promstroybank and renamed it Bank VTB North-West, later becoming the VTB's North-Western Regional Centre in March 2011.

== See also ==
- Banking in the Soviet Union
