= Jeffrey Galmond =

Danish Supreme Court lawyer and businessman

Jeffrey Peter Galmond is a Danish Supreme Court lawyer and businessman. He is the owner of the law firm J. P. Galmond & Co. He owned large portions of the holding companies that owned the Russian mobile telecommunications operator Megafon. One of these portions was contested. Galmond had been accused of not being the true owner of the Russian assets, but of acting as a front to Russian minister of telecommunications Leonid Reiman. These claims were vigorously denied by Galmond.

== Involvement with Leonid Reiman ==
Galmond became acquainted with Leonid Reiman in the 1980s.

With headquarters in Copenhagen and offices in Hamburg, J.P. Galmond & Company established a presence in telecommunication, finance, and company law in Russia in 1989 and a representation office in St Petersburg in 1992 and in Moscow in 2000. In the early 1990s, Galmond met Leonid Reiman in Leningrad (St Petersburg), who was an executive with the Leningrad City Telephone Network (LGTS) that was renamed the St. Petersburg City Telephone Network (PTS) in 1993. Galmond later became Reiman's attorney. In 1994, Reiman collected numerous joint ventures of telecoms owned by his state-controlled employer into OAO Telecominvest (TCI) (Russian: ОАО "Телекоминвест") (Note: Lyudmila Putina represented OAO Telecominvest from 1998-1999 in Moscow after her husband the former deputy mayor of St Petersburg Vladimir Putin moved from St Petersburg to Moscow in 1997 and later became the Director of the successor to the KGB, the Federal Security Service in July 1998.) in which his employer had a 95% share and Galmond the rest. (Note: The St Petersburg Telephone Network (PTS) (Russian: "Петербургской телефонной сетью" (ПТС)) and the St. Petersburg Long-distance International Telephone (St. Petersburg MMT) (Russian: "Санкт-Петербургским междугородным международным телефоном" (СПб ММТ)) combined their assets to form OAO Telecominvest in 1994.) In 1995, the non-Galmond held share was owned through First National Holding SA from Luxembourg by Germany's Commerzbank with a 51% share and by Reiman's employer and another state-controlled company with a 49% share. (Note: Valery Yashin (Russian: Валерий Яшин), who was Reiman's boss at PTS, owned and controlled both ComPlus Holding SA and First National Holding SA. The western investors were personally chosen by Reiman. ComPlus Holding SA was a co-founder of PeterStar. Yashin was the head of Svyazinvest (Russian: Связьинвест) when it gained North-West Telecommunications Holding. The founders of NTS were St. Petersburg Payphones (51% in the authorized capital), Mobitel, a subsidiary of Svyazinvest (40%), and the Moscow financial company LV Finance (9%). In 1997, Michael Cherney bought Mobitel from Grigory Luchansky.) Then, First National Holding's share grew to 85%. OAO Telecominvest's main asset was a 45% stake in North-West GSM which became the core of Megafon. In 2001, after Commerzbank through its First National Holding SA ended its share of Telecominvest, Galmond had several companies including IPOC International Growth Fund which was established in 2000 in Bermuda and Lapal Ltd., Albany Invest Ltd., and Mercury Import Ltd. in the British Virgin Islands (BVI) acquire the telecom holdings of Commerzbank's former interests. IPOC International Growth Fund was formed as a mutual fund, however, there were no investment from shareholders owning a stake in it: The only income IPOC received was from its subsidiaries.

== IPOC International Growth Fund ==
IPOC International Growth Fund, which controls several Russian telecoms, was competing against Alfa Group for control of a large share in Megafon. Both IPOC and Alfa Group used numerous 1929 Holding Company Schemes with shell companies in the British Virgin Islands, Luxembourg, Cyprus, Cayman Islands, and Delaware.

Galmond's disputed 25% share in Megafon was held by Leonid Rozhetskin's LV Finance, a company which sold its share on 5 August 2003 for $200 million through several shell companies to Altimo a subsidiary of Alfa Group, the company fronted by Russian oligarch Mikhail Fridman. But, Galmond had an agreement to purchase LV Finance's 25% share in MegaFon already in 2001. Alfa Group was at the centre of many disputes involving disputed ownership of telecommunications operations. These companies included Norwegian Telenor, Swedish-Finnish TeliaSonera, Turkey's Turkcell and others. IPOC International Growth Fund even launched a RICO suit in the United States against Alfa Group and its associates.

Early 2004 while Leonid Reiman was Deputy Minister of Transport and Communications, Gossvyaznadzor (Russian: Госсвязьнадзор) stated that it is unclear how taxes are paid by VimpelCom OJSC and Impulse Design Bureau OJSC, which is a wholly owned subsidiary of VimpelCom. Reiman suggested that the two merge. While the courts came to a decision, however, Megafon greatly increase its market share in the key Moscow region as VimpelCom was held back from expanding into that region. At the time, Alfa had a significant share in Vimpel.

In Geneva, the International Chamber of Commerce arbitration tribunal ruled that IPOC International Growth Fund had legal right to the 25% share in MegaFon and that Alfa Grouup did not have a genuine and proper commercial transaction when it tried to obtain the stake. During the proceedings, Kroll, a private investigations firm, had surveilled the chairman of the Geneva panel.

In March 2004 on a tip from Alfa Group that IPOC International Growth Fund was involved in money laundering activities, Paula Cox, the Bermuda Minister of Finance, hired Michael Morrison and Malcolm Butterfield of KPMG to independently investigate the IPOC International Growth Fund and eleven other associated companies for any improper activities.

On 9 March 2005, TeliaSonera, TeleComInvest, and IPOC International Growth Fund signed a shareholders' agreement in which they would actively pursue MegaFon's public listing.

From the spring to October of 2005, Richard Burt's Due Diligence (Note: Due Diligence was founded in 2000 by Richard Burt, Lord Powell of Bayswater and others in Washington, D.C., as a private intelligence and risk-assessment and management firm. Diligence Europe was headed by Michael Howard.) performed Project Yucca for BGR (Note: Founded by Haley Barbour, BGR was hired by Alfa Group through its telecom subsidiary.) in which the auditing firm KPMG was infiltrated for Alfa Group's benefit by Due Diligence in order to obtain information about KPMG's audit of the IPOC International Growth Fund. (Note: During Project Yucca, the shareholders of Due Diligence were CEO Nick Day who was a former British agent and a co-founder of Due Diligence, the Chairman of Due Diligence Richard Burt, the Exxel Group which is a Buenos Aires private equity firm, and Edward Mathias from The Carlyle Group which is a private equity company from Washington, D.C.) Later, the Bermuda government accused the IPOC International Growth Fund, which is associated with Bermuda and BVI registered owners of Russian telecoms, of money laundering and also accused Due Diligence of impersonating secret service personnel.

Author Eamon Javers in his book "Broker, Trader, lawyer, Spy", describes the infiltration by Alfa Group's agents into the KPMG investigation and the attempt to influence and manipulate the result of the investigation.

In November 2005, The Financial Times reported that Jeffrey Galmond established through court documents that Leonid Reiman is the sole beneficiary of the Fiduciare Commerce Trust which indirectly controls OAO Telecominvest.

In 2006, the beneficial owner of IPOC International Growth Fund was found to be Leonid Reiman according to a Zurich ruling by the International Chamber of Commerce.

In February 2007, Galmond was accused by the Bermuda Minister of Finance, Paula Cox of minor infringements of local business requirements. She asked the supreme court to wind up IPOC International Growth Fund, a company owned by Galmond, along with several other companies associated with Galmond. Galmond and IPOC worked to solve the issue. One step taken was for IPOC to fund a report by KPMG into its operations. KPMG's report, which cost its client(s) US$13 million, found no evidence that Galmond was not the beneficial owner of the MegaFon stake, or Alfa's claim that money going into IPOC funds was the proceeds of money laundering.

In April 2007 Finance Minister Paula Cox instructed the Registrar of Companies to file the petition to wind-up IPOC International Growth Fund and eight related companies. The move was aimed at protecting Bermuda's reputation as a jurisdiction. Bermuda also received around $22.5 million as its share of $45 million confiscated on 1 May 2008 from IPOC International Growth Fund in a criminal prosecution in the British Virgin Islands, where three IPOC-owned companies were domiciled.

In July 2007, Altimo, which is owned by Mikhail Fridman's Alfa Group, won in its dispute with the IPOC International Growth Fund and received ownership of the 25.1% stake in MegaFon which was formerly owned by LV Finance. Both Altimo and IPOC International Growth Fund jointly decided to "end all court actions and end legal claims against each other." At that time, IPOC through its holdings in TeleComInvest held a 39.3% share of MegaFon and Alfa Group through Altimo held a 25.1% stake in MegaFon.

== RTK-Leasing ==
In 2005, Galmond owned a 95% stake in Svyaz-Bank (Russian: Связь-банк), which had been privatized in 2003, through RTK-Leasing (Russian: "РТК-Лизинг"), which is part of the IPOC Bermuda Fund. RTK-Leasing supplied equipment for the Russian post office which was considering support from Svyaz-Bank to create a Russian Post Bank because many Russian pensioners had accounts with Svyaz-Bank. In September 2008, VEB gained a 98% stake and control of Svyaz-Bank. Before the collapse of Svyaz-Bank and its subsequent takeover by VEB, both Daniel Bolotin (Russian: Даниэль Болотин), who lived among Israel, Netherlands and Germany, was formerly known as Yevgeny Bolotin (Russian: Евгений Болотин; born in Mogilev, Byelorussian SSR, USSR) and was very close to Alexander Korovnikov (Russian: Александр Коровников), and Roland Pieper (Russian: Роланд Пипер) of European Technology and Investment Research Center (ETIRC) had received a $150 million loan from Svyaz-Bank in December 2007 for their purchase of Eclipse Aviation to rebrand the company as Eclipse Aerospace. From April 2004 until September 2008, Gennady Meshcheryakov (Russian: Геннадий Мещеряков) led Svyaz-Bank. In June 2010, Svyaz-Bank sued Tigran Nersisyan's (Russian: Тигран Нерсисян) Borodino Group for failure to repay a 5.8 billion rubles loan.

== Other work ==
Galmond has also worked as a lawyer for companies associated with Jón Ásgeir Jóhannesson's Icelandic conglomerate Baugur Group.

In June 1993, Björgólfur Guðmundsson, Björgólfur Thor Björgólfsson and Magnús Þorsteinsson were among Galmond's first clients when Galmond was their attorney beginning with the establishment of their bottling company Baltic Bottling Plant in Saint Petersburg which was sold to Pepsi for 4 billion DKK in 1997.

In April 2012 the Prosecutor in the German city of Frankfurt withdrew charges against Galmond and four former employees of Commerzbank AG of money laundering. The investigations of the German prosecutor had lasted for 7 years.

Danish tabloid newspaper BT, on its front page of 24 December 2012, claimed that Galmond had committed tax evasion and fraud with the IPOC shares. On 15 January 2014, as a result of a libel case instigated by Galmond against the tabloid BT, BT publicly withdrew its accusations. As a result of a plea-bargain, BT paid compensation of DKK 100,000 to Galmond and the cost of the libel case.

Galmond today lives in Switzerland. He had sold all of the assets in IPOC International Growth Fund after its liquidation in 2008.

== Controversy ==
On 15 December 2011, the Frankfurt am Main prosecutor's office and German criminal authorities named Leonid Reiman as a suspect in a 1990s money laundering scheme involving Commerzbank, his longtime attorney Jeffrey Galmond, and four employees of Commerzbank. The case had begun as an investigation into the looting of Russia during the 1990s. In the first half of 1996, Reiman, Galmond, and Michael Boehmke, which both Galmond and Boehmke are attorneys with the Hamburg based firm Bollmann, Kisselbach & Partners, created agreements with Commerzbank. Galmond was the owner of First National Holding (FNH), a Luxembourg based firm, and Telecominvest holding (Russian: холдинг «Телекоминвест») had accounts at Commerzbank and both companies had secret trust agreements with Reiman as Commerzbank acted as the owner of FNH until 2002. FNH was formed on 11 May 1995 and was previously known as the Selz & Turban Holding SA, which was headed by a Luxembourg attorney and was owned by two shell companies located in Panama. In 2008, The Frankfurt court determined that Reiman was the beneficiary of Danco Finans which Galmond claimed ownership and through which trust agreements were held by Commerzbank.

== Books ==
- Javers, Eamon (9 February 2010). Broker, Trader, Lawyer, Spy: The Secret World of Corporate Espionage. Harper Business. ISBN 978-0061697203.
