= Peter Owen Edmunds =

British entrepreneur in Post-Soviet Russia

Major Peter Owen Edmunds (21 January 1959 in London – 24 September 2016) was a British Army officer who became a leading dealmaker in the Russian telecoms industry. He was a co-founder of Peterstar, the first private telecoms operator in St. Petersburg.

== Education ==
Owen Edmunds, whose surname was always spelt without a hyphen, was educated at Harrow School and Durham University, where he graduated with a degree in politics in 1981.

== Career ==
In 1982, as a young officer in the 1st Battalion, Welsh Guards, Owen Edmunds was deployed to the Falkland Islands following the Argentine invasion. Serving as a rifle platoon commander with No. 3 Company, he survived the Argentine air attack on RFA Sir Galahad, in which 32 of his fellow Welsh Guardsmen were killed. After the war, he remained with the Welsh Guards, serving as an intelligence officer and, in 1985, as a temporary equerry to the Prince of Wales. From 1987, he served as an adjutant with the British Army of the Rhine at Bergen-Hohne, under Christopher Drewry.

In 1988, Owen Edmunds was selected to join BRIXMIS, the British military liaison mission to Soviet forces in East Germany. He spent two years learning Russian and German and undertaking the technical training required for the role, arriving in Germany shortly before the fall of the Berlin Wall. He was tasked with closing the BRIXMIS mission house in Potsdam and subsequently served for a period as interpreter to Robert Corbett, Commandant of the British Sector in Berlin.

=== Russia ===
In 1992, Owen Edmunds abruptly resigned from the British Army to pursue business opportunities in Russia following perestroika. He was among the founders of the telecommunications company Peterstar, which became St Petersburg's first commercial fixed-network competitor. He recalled that the company's first licence was signed by Vladimir Putin, then serving as deputy mayor of the city, whom he described as "monosyllabic" and suspicious. During this period, he was also a source for the business journalist Martin Vander Weyer.

Owen Edmunds served as chairman of Peterstar from 1999 to 2002 and subsequently worked as a partner in Tudno Sutton Associates, a consultancy specializing in advising companies on strategies for the Russian and Baltic markets. In July 2004, he was appointed chief executive of Consolidated Communications Corporation, a telecommunications company operating across Russia and Eastern Europe. In 2009, he and fellow entrepreneur Garth Self founded Russian Towers, a company which constructed and operated mobile phone towers in Russia. By 2016, Self and Owen Edmunds owned what was described as the largest portfolio of mobile phone towers in the country.

== Personal life and death ==
Owen Edmunds was married and had four children. From 1999 he maintained a home in Wiltshire while regularly commuting to Russia.

He died of cancer on 24 September 2016, and was working on a business deal up to the day he died. He had been received into the Catholic Church two weeks earlier.
