= Synterra Media =

National communication carrier of Russia

«Synterra Media»
- Company type: Closed joint-stock company
- Industry: Telecommunication
- Founded: 2006
- Headquarters: Moscow, Russian Federation
- Area served: Russian Federation
- Key people: Valery Krylov; CEO
- Parent: Multiregional TransitTelecom
- Website: www.synterra-media.ru

Synterra Media (Russian: Синтерра Медиа) is the national backbone communication carrier of Russia, which provides a comprehensive range of telecommunication services to national corporations, public structures, corporate customers, communication operators, content providers and private users in the territory of Russia and the CIS countries, Baltic states, Europe and Asia. It is fully owned by Multiregional TransitTelecom.

== History ==
In the mid-2000s, Mohamed Amersi, who headed the American investment bank Gramercy Communications Partners (Note: The American investment bank Gramercy Communications Partners was created by Juan Villalonga who also created the Spanish telecommunications firm Telefonica.) and Juan Villalonga created the Emergent Telecom Ventures (ETV) fund which gained control of numerous Russian fixed telecommunications firms including the Moscow-based firms Komet (Russian: «Комет»), Globus-Telecom (Russian: «Глобус-Телеком») and Telekom-Center (Russian: «Телеком-центр»); the St. Petersburg based Peterstar (Russian: «Петерстар»), and backbone internet operator RTKomm.ru «РТКомм.ру» which was established in 2000. In 2005, Synterra merged with ETV to become a major alternative fixed-line operator under the control of Eventis Telecom Holdings (Cyprus) (ETH), which was owned by Dmitry Ivanter (Russian: Дмитрий Ивантер) and Vladimir Androsik (Russian: Владимир Андросик), and was close to the "St. Petersburg group of communications" (Russian: «питерской группы связистов») and the Leonid Reiman associated "Telecominvest" (Russian: «Телекоминвест»). Promsvyazkapital (Russian: «Промсвязькапитал») took control of Synterra.

== Owners ==
The company was founded in 2006. The aim of the company is to develop Synterra's media projects. In September, 2009 Synterra Group of Companies (GC) got operational control of Synterra Media as GC bought 40,01% stocks. GC "Synterra" owns 60% of "Synterra Media". That gives GC the right to make decisions on further development of this project.

In 2010, MegaFon under the leadership of Sergey Soldatenkov (Russian: Сергей Владимирович Солдатенков) gained control of Synterra Media with a 60% stake and spun off to Rostelecom several assets including RTKomm.ru, Telecom-Center (renamed Synterra-Media) and Globus-Telecom. (Note: In 2008, Leonid Reiman resigned as Russian Minister of Communications and the "St. Petersburg group of communications" sold their stake in Megafon.) (Note: In 2008-2009, Eventis Telecom Holdings (Cyprus) (ETH), which was owned by Dmitry Ivanter (Russian: Дмитрий Ивантер) and Vladimir Androsik (Russian: Владимир Андросик), lost control over Megafon.)

On 22 October 2020, PJSC Rostelecom (Russian: ПАО "Ростелеком") agreed to buy a 100% stake in ZAO Synterra Media (Russian: ЗАО "Синтерра Медиа") from MTT (Russian: АО "Межрегиональный Транзиттелеком" («МТТ»)) for 1.5 billion rubles which allows MTT to focus on the integration of real-time telecom services or Unified Communications and Telecom API. Synterra delivers and distributes media content from the event venues to the television broadcasting companies such as Channel One, VGTRK, NTV, Russia Today, TV Center, Match TV. Both directly and through its subsidiaries, MTT had consolidated its 100% stake in Synterra Media in 2013. As of 2014, MTT, which has 25 million subscribers, competes with Inoventika (Russian: ООО "Иновентика Технолоджес") (Note: Established in May 2011 and is owned by KDI (Russian: ЗАО "Коммуникации для инноваций" (КДИ)), Inoventika has on its board of directors Vitaly Slizen (Russian: Виталий Слизень) and added both Igor Putin, who left as head of JSC Construction Management-888 (Russian: ОАО "Строительное управление-888") in Yakutia and his advisory position with Russian Land Bank (Russian: Российский земельный банк) (Note: In April 1999, the Russian Land Bank (Russian: Российский земельный банк) (RZB) had accounts with Inteko (Russian: «Интеко») and associated with Elena Baturyna (Russian: Еле́на Никола́евна Бату́рина) through which large sums of money were transferred to accounts in Nauru. In December 2010, Baturina sold her stake in the Russian Land Bank to firms registered in Cyprus and in February 2012, Igor Putin and others joined RZB board.) after the November 2013 closing of Master Bank (Russian: Мастер-банк) where he was on the board of directors, and Rodolphe Lucien Felix Evangelisti, who is an independent director of the grocery store chain Seventh Continent (Russian: "Седьмой континент") since 2010 and, from 2002-2012, was chairman of the board of CJSC Natixis-Bank (Russian: ЗАО "Натиксис-банк"). The ZAO Regional Initiative (Russian: ЗАО "Региональная инициатива") has a 63% stake in KDI. A 32% stake in KDI is held by Vladimir Shcherbinin (Russian: Владимир Щербинин), who is a member of the board of directors of MPO Klassika (Russian: МПО "Классика") while the Svetlana Nikiforova owned OOO Startobaza (Russian: ООО "Стартобаза") (Note: The attorney Svetlana Palatova Nikiforova (Russian: Светлана Палатова Никифорова; born 1982 Almetyevsk) is the wife of Nikolay Nikiforov (Russian: Никола́й Ники́форов)) has a 5% stake. In addition to Inoventika, KDI also owns Radio Television Svyaz LLC (Russian: ООО "Радио Телевидение Связь") and has a 60% stake in Garant Park-Internet LLC (Russian: ООО "Гарант Парк-интернет").) for cloud computing.

== Activities ==
- Operator of TV-lines network.
- Processing and delivery of TV-signal
- Business partner for operators of cable TV.
- Variant platform IPTV for regional operators of broadband Internet access.

== Activity ==
- Supply of on-line TV broadcast from International Song Contest “Eurovision-2009”
- Supply of online broadcast of the Shanghai Cooperation Organisation (SCO) and BRICS summits
- Principal partner for "live" broadcast of Football Championship of Russia
- Technical partner of HD channel “2 Спорт 2” devoted to 2010 Winter Olympics in Vancouver
- Telecommunication supply of on-line TV broadcasting for leading Russian TV companies of Moscow events devoted to the Victory Day
- Telecommunication supply of on-line broadcasting for Russian TV companies and operators of pay TV channels from 2010 FIFA World Cup
- TV broadcast from St. Petersburg International Economic Forum

== New Digital TV ==
"Synterra Media" and Microsoft negotiated cooperation. Companies offer joint decision of extra services for IPTV development for regional operators of broadband Internet access. The new digital TV on the base of the Microsoft MediaRoom platform was launched in test mode on 1 July 2010.
