= Yuri Soloviev (banker) =

Russian banker

Yuri Alexéyevich Soloviév
- Born: 13 April 1970 (age 56); Ulan Bator, Mongolia
- Education: Plekhanov Russian University of Economics
- Occupation: Banker
- Spouse: Galina Olegovna Ulyutina

Yuri Alekseevich Soloviev (Юрий Алексеевич Соловьев) (born 13 April 1970) is a Russian-British banker who was first deputy president and chairman of the VTB Bank Management Board. He was sanctioned by the United States after Russia invaded Ukraine in February 2022.

The Soloviev family was mentioned in the Panama Papers in relation to transactions through offshore companies.

== Biography ==
Yuri Soloviev was born on 13 April 1970 in Ulan Bator (Mongolia). He graduated from the Plekhanov Russian University of Economics with a degree in international economic relations in 1994. In 2002, he gained his MBA from the London Business School.

In 1994, Soloviev started working as a dealer at Incombank, where he later became the senior dealer in the International Market Transactions Department of the Currency and Foreign Transactions Division.

In 1996, he moved to Lehman Brothers in London. In less than seven years, Soloviev rose from being an analyst to executive director of the Emerging Markets Department.

In 2002, he joined the London office of Deutsche Bank AG as a director, heading up the Department of Transactions on Eastern European Markets. Soloviev returned to Russia in 2006, where he took up the position of head of the investment unit and first deputy chairman of the management board.

From September 2006 to February 2008 he was an independent director at Synterra.

In 2008, he became head of VTB Group's investment business and president of VTB Capital. In April of the same year, he was made an independent director at Eurotech, while from February to June he was chairman of the board of directors of DB Development (a joint enterprise between Deutsche Bank and Strabag).

From 29 June 2010 to 29 June 2012 he was a member of the board of directors of Federal Grid Company.

Since May 2011, Soloviev has been first deputy president and chairman of VTB Bank's Management Board. That year, the bank achieved a record net profit of RUB 90.5bn and was the leading bank on the domestic bond loan market.

In the same year, Soloviev was placed first place in Forbes magazine's list of Russia's Richest Managers.

He was the chairman of the board of directors of VTB Leasing since May 2011.

In June 2019, he was appointed a member of the board of directors of Football Club Dynamo Moscow JSC. Prior to that VTB became the controlling stakeholder of the club.

He was also the chairman of the board of directors at VTB Capital Holding and VTB Capital.

Soloviev is a member of the board of trustees of the Plekhanov Russian University of Economics.

== Personal life ==
He is married to Galina Olegovna Ulyutina. According to the US Treasury, she has been involved in golden passport schemes. He has two daughters and one son.

He owns a $1.6 million apartment in London.

After Russia annexed Crimea and Soloviev was at risk of being sanctioned by the West, he transferred offshore assets worth $41 million to his mother-in-law.

== Awards ==
Order of Honour (1 March 2017) – for making a significant contribution to the development of the Russian economy, strengthening the position of Russia in the global oil and gas industry and successfully resolving tasks to improve the investment climate in the Russian Federation.

Order of Friendship (31 March 2020) – for contributing to the development of the Russian economy, finance and many years of work committed to fostering further improvement of these areas.
