= Leonid Reiman =

Russian businessman and government official

- Леонид Рейман
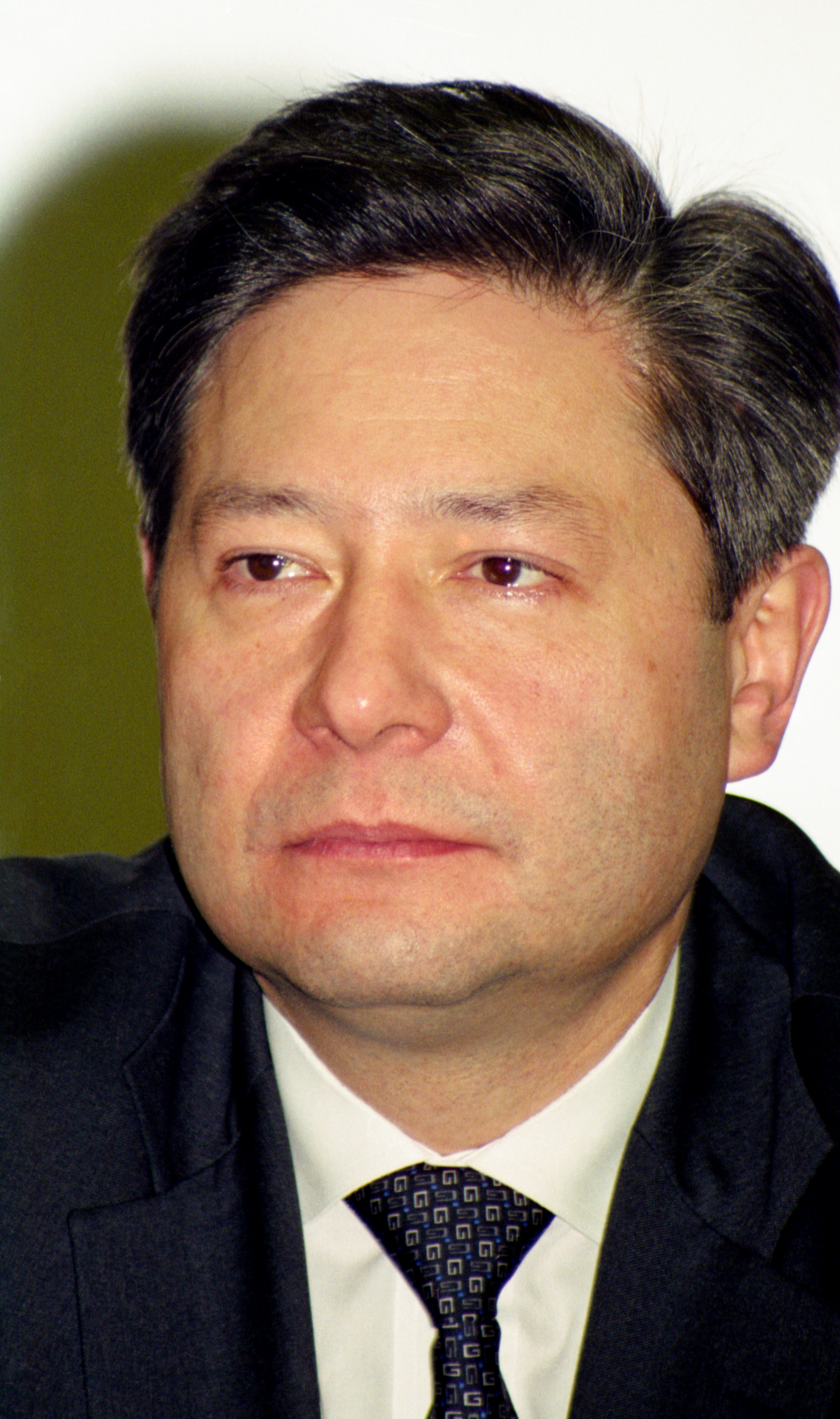
- Reiman in 2001

Minister of Information Technologies and Communications of Russia
- In office 20 May 2004 – 12 May 2008
- President: Vladimir Putin
- Preceded by: Himself as Minister of Communications and Informatics of Russia

Minister of Communications and Informatics of Russia
- In office 12 November 1999 – 9 March 2004
- President: Vladimir Putin
- Preceded by: Himself as Chairman of the State Committee for Telecommunications
- Succeeded by: Igor Shchyogolev

Personal details
- Born: July 12, 1957 (age 69) Leningrad, Soviet Union
- Education: M.A. Bonch-Bruevich Leningrad Institute of Communications Technology
- Awards: Order "For Merit to the Fatherland"; Russian Government Prize for Science and Technology

Leonid Dodojonovich Reiman (Russian: Леонид Дододжонович Рейман; born 12 July 1957) is a Russian businessman and government official, former Minister of Communications and Information Technologies of the Russian Federation. He has the federal state civilian service rank of 1st class Active State Councillor of the Russian Federation.

Leonid Reiman has been numerously rated most influential person in Russian telecom business with personal wealth over $1 bln., according to Finance magazine.

== Biography ==
Leonid Reiman was born on July 12, 1957, in Leningrad. His father, Dodojon Tadjiyev, was a Soviet and Tajik philologist, professor, and head of the Tajik language department at Tajik State University. His mother, Ekaterina Reiman, a professor, served as the head of the St. Petersburg Department of Foreign Languages at the Russian Academy of Sciences.

== Education ==
In 1979, Leonid Reiman graduated from the M.A. Bonch-Bruevich Leningrad Institute of Communications Technology (now SPbGUT - Saint-Petersburg State University of Telecommunications and IT).

In 2000, Reiman defended his MPhil thesis titled “Improving the System of State Regulation of the Telecommunications Industry”.

In 2004, he earned his doctoral degree with a dissertation on “The Formation and Development of the Infocommunication Services Market,” receiving the title of Doctor of Economic Sciences.

== Career ==
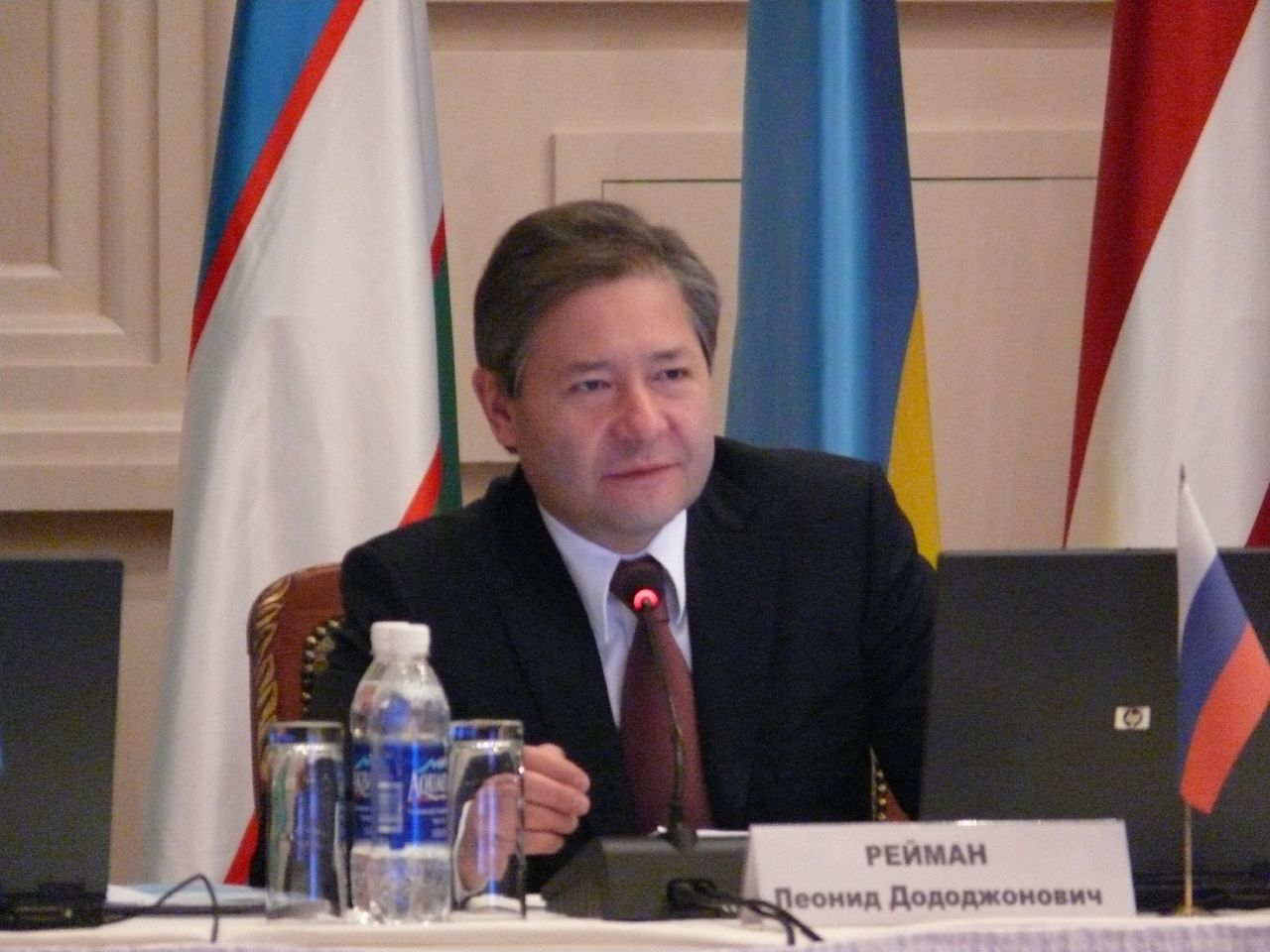
Leonid Reiman speaking at a conference

- 1979–1983, engineer and then section chief at the Leningrad city international telephone statio.
- 1983–1985, Leonid Reiman did a tour of compulsory military service.
- 1985–1999, Reiman occupied leading positions in the Leningrad City Telephone Network (LGTS) / in 1993 renamed to St. Petersburg City Telephone Network (PTS).
- 1988–1999, Deputy Chief of the LGTS/PTS for development; LGTS/PTS Chief Engineer, Director for International Relations, Director for Investitions and International Relations, First Deputy Director-General of Open JSC PTS.
- In 1992 Reiman entered the board of directors of Peterstar, the first non-state owned cell phone operator in Saint Petersburg co-founded in 1992 by ComPlus Holding.
- Early 1990s Reiman meets attorney Jeffrey Galmond who becomes an investment assistant to Reiman.
- In 1994, he joined the board of directors of the JSC Telecominvest.
- Lyudmila Putina represents OAO Telecominvest from 1998 to 1999 in Moscow after her husband the former deputy mayor of St Petersburg Vladimir Putin moved from St Petersburg to Moscow in 1997 and later became the Director of the successor to the KGB, the Federal Security Service in July 1998.
- As of June 1999, he was a member of the boards of directors of the JSC Delta Telecom, JSC Neva Line, JSC Peterstar, Stankinbank, JSC St. Petersburg City Telephone Network, editorial JSC St. Petersburg Directories, JSC Interregional Transit Telecom, JSC North-West GSM, the chairman of the board of directors of the JSC St. Petersburg International and TransTelecom and a member of the supervisory board of the JSC St. Petersburg Intercity International Telephone.
- From July 1999, state secretary, first deputy chairman of the State Committee for Telecommunications (Gostelecom).
- From August 1999, Gostelecom chairman.
- November 1999 – April 2004, Minister of Information and Communications of the Russian Federation.
- Since 26 June 2000, and up to 2010 Leonid Reiman is the chairman of the board of directors of Open JSC Svyazinvest.
- March – May 2004, First Deputy Minister of Transport and Communications of the Russian Federation.
- Leonid Reiman was appointed Minister of Communications and Information Technologies of the Russian Federation on 20 May 2004, where he served until 12 May 2008.
- May 2008 – August 2010 – Adviser to the President of the Russian Federation, Secretary for Presidential Council of Information Society Development.
- March 2011 – chairman of the supervisory board of Mandriva.
- From 2011 to 2023, he was a co-owner of Angstrem, a Russian semiconductor company. Since 2012, he has served as president of Alternativa Capital, a company specializing in the development and promotion of high-tech products.

Founder of RIO-Center, now Institute of Contemporary Development (INSOR), Russian liberal think tank chaired by President Dmitry Medvedev.

== Contributions to Russia’s Mobile Communications, the Internet, and Digital Television ==
=== Mobile Communications ===
In 1991, Leonid Reiman organized the first mobile phone call in Russia, connecting the Mayor of St. Petersburg, Anatoly Sobchak, with the Mayor of Seattle, Norman Rice.

In 1999, while serving as Minister of Communications, he initiated the removal of the requirement for a special permit to use a mobile phone, which was previously necessary.

In 2007, at the InfoCom-2007 exhibition, he made the first video call in Russia over a 3G network, connecting with St. Petersburg Governor Valentina Matviyenko.

In 2003, Reiman assisted in drafting and adopting the “Communications Law,” which established the legal framework for the growth of the communications and IT sectors in Russia. The law also abolished charges for incoming calls.

This legislation contributed to a surge in mobile subscribers in Russia, reaching 187 million by 2008, while reducing the average call cost to 5 cents per minute.

=== Internet ===
In 2006, the Russian Ministry of Communications and the Ministry of Education and Science launched the “Education” national project, which included connecting Russian schools to the Internet. In 2012, the Ministry of Education of Russia reported that all schools in the country had been connected to the Internet between 2006 and 2007.

During his tenure, Russian dotcoms such as Rambler and Yandex significantly strengthened their market presence. In 2007, Yandex dominated 54.6% of RuNet's search traffic, Rambler followed with a 16.7% share.

=== Digital Television ===
In 2008, during his tenure as Minister of Communications, Reiman initiated the launch of Russia's digital television network.

== Public Activities ==
In 1994, Reiman co-founded the Foundation for the History of Radio Engineering and Communications in St. Petersburg, dedicated to supporting the Popov Central Museum of Communications.

He contributed to the renovation of the Popov Central Museum of Communications, which continues to operate today. The museum regained its status as a state-run institution and secured budgetary funding.

Leonid Reiman sponsored the renovation and modernization of School #211 in St. Petersburg, where he had studied. The school reopened its doors in 2020 to mark its 160th anniversary.

Reiman sponsors the “Who, if Not Me?” endowment established by his wife, Olga Reiman, which helps children in challenging life situations.

== Hobbies ==
Reiman enjoys classical music and is a tennis enthusiast.

An avid reader, he has authored several books, including “On the Path to the Digital Home,” which explores computer technology.

Since 2004, he has been active in helicopter sports and served as president of the Russian Helicopter Sports Federation from February 2007 to December 2009.

== Controversies ==
On 25 July 2000, Leonid Reiman issued the order No 130 "Concerning the introduction of technical means ensuring investigative activity (SORM) in phone, mobile, wireless communication and radio paging networks" stating that the FSB was no longer required to provide telecommunications and Internet companies documentation on targets of interest prior to accessing information.

During the early 2004 tax dispute in Russia by Gossvyaznadzor (Russian: Госсвязьнадзор) about VimpelCom OJSC and its wholly owned subsidiary Impulse Design Bureau OJSC, Leonid Reiman, as the Deputy Minister of Transport and Communications, stated that it is unclear how taxes are paid by the companies but requested that the two should merge. Megafon increased its market share in the key Moscow region while VimpelCom was held back from expanding into that region awaiting the courts to decide the tax issue. Alfa Group, which has a significant share in Vimpel, was involved in a dispute over ownership of Leonid Rozhetskin's LV Finance former 25% stake in MegaFon with IPOC International Growth Fund during VimpelCom's tax issue with the Russian government.

In 2004 the British businessman Anthony Georgiou claimed in a court affidavit lodged in a British Virgin Islands court that in 1992 Reiman had received a bribe of about a million US dollars from him.

During a Bermuda government supported audit of IPOC International Growth Fund Ltd's KPMG investigation in 2005, the top official has been named in a number of legal actions as Leonid Reiman, Russia's telecommunications minister. Mr Reiman has denied the claims. In 2006, the beneficial owner of the IPOC International Growth Fund is Leonid Reiman according to a Zurich ruling by the International Chamber of Commerce.

On 15 December 2011, the Frankfurt am Main prosecutor's office and German criminal authorities named Reiman as a suspect in a 1990s money laundering scheme involving Commerzbank, his longtime attorney Jeffrey Galmond, and four employees of Commerzbank. The case had begun as an investigation into the looting of Russia during the 1990s.

In late 2013, Finnish officials with the National Bureau of Investigation or Keskusrikospoliisi (KRP) implicated Reiman in a money laundering scheme with Sekom's founder, Andrei Titov, where $11 million were transferred through Sekom to Cyprus Albany Investment and then to the Bermuda IPOC International Growth Fund.

== Honours and awards ==
- Order of Merit for the Fatherland;
  - 3rd class (12 July 2007) – for outstanding contribution to the development of modern information technologies and the creation of the domestic telecommunications network
  - 4th class (12 July 2005) – for great contribution to the development of the telecommunications industry of the country and many years of fruitful work
- Honoured Worker of Russian telecommunications
- RF Government Prize in Education and Science and Technology
- Winner of the annual international prize "Person of the Year" (2005)
- Winner of the highest legal prize "Themis" (2003)
- Reiman was awarded the "Commonwealth" Order for his contributions to the CIS Interparliamentary Assembly (2006)
