= Leonid Rozhetskin =

Latvian financier and lawyer

- Леонид Рожецкин
- Born: August 4, 1966; Leningrad, Soviet Union
- Disappeared: March 16, 2008 (aged 41); Jūrmala, Latvia
- Body discovered: Latvian forest
- Citizenship: U.S.
- Education: Harvard Law School
- Alma mater: Columbia University
- Occupations: Lawyer, financier
- Years active: 1990–2008
- Spouse: Natalya Belova
- Children: 1

Leonid Borisovich Rozhetskin (Russian: Леонид Борисович Рожецкин, born August 4, 1966; disappeared March 16, 2008) was an American financier and lawyer who went missing under suspicious circumstances after disappearing from his village in Jūrmala, Latvia. In 2013, remains found nearby the year before were confirmed to be Rozhetskin's.

== Early life and education ==
Rozhetskin was born in 1966 to a Jewish family in Leningrad, Soviet Union; he and his mother Elvira emigrated to the United States in 1980, where he became a U.S. citizen. Rozhetskin was a "brilliant student", winning scholarships to Columbia University, where he graduated with distinction. In 1990, Rozhetskin graduated cum laude from Harvard Law School.

Rozhetskin received a Certificate of Distinction in Teaching from Harvard University, for teaching Harvard and Radcliffe undergraduates during the 1989-90 academic year.

== Legal career ==
Rozhetskin began his legal career as a law clerk for Judge Stephen V. Wilson, a federal judge in Los Angeles, California; he then joined the law firm White & Case.

At the age of 26, Rozhetskin returned to Russia, first as a lawyer at White & Case's Moscow office, and then as the head of his own law firm, representing clients such as the International Finance Corporation (a division of the World Bank), Credit Suisse, Morgan Grenfell and The Moscow Times.

== Career in investments, mining and media ==
In 1995, Rozhetskin's focus shifted from the law to financial ventures. Rozhetskin was part of a group that founded Renaissance Capital, Russia's first investment bank, in partnership with Boris Jordan, an American of Russian origin, and New Zealander Stephen Jennings.

In 1998, Rozhetskin left Renaissance Capital to co-found the independent venture capital firm LV Finance. With help from Leonid Reiman, LV Finance secured 25% of MegaFon at the time Reiman was Russia's telecommunications minister. In August 2003, Rozhetskin sold the MegaFon stake to Altimo, a subsidiary of Mikhail Fridman's Alfa Group. (Note: Jeffrey Galmond claimed to have obtained an agreement to purchase LV Finance's 25% stake in MegaFon in 2001 through the Bermuda-based IPOC International Growth Fund. In July 2007, IPOC and Altimo agreed to Altimo's ownership of the former LV Finance 25% stake in MegaFon.)

From October 2001 until January 2005, Rozhetskin served as Executive Vice Chairman of Norilsk Nickel, Russia's largest mining company and the world's largest miner of nickel and palladium metals. Rozhetskin was also a board member and founding shareholder of City A.M., London's first free daily business newspaper.

Rozhetskin founded a production company called L + E Productions with Eric Eisner, son of former Disney executive Michael Eisner. Through L + E Productions, he was credited as a producer of Hamlet 2; he was also credited as an executive producer of the 2009 film Boogie Woogie.

== Personal life ==
Rozhetskin married model Natalya Belova, who gave birth to their son in 2005. According to The Sunday Times, Rozhetskin's friends suspected he lived a closeted life, prompted by what the newspaper called Russia's "machismo and deep-seated homophobia"; the "extraordinary lengths to [he went to] conceal his homosexuality included withholding the truth on the subject from his mother, who characterized claims of her son's homosexuality as a "smear campaign".

== Disappearance and death ==
Rozhetskin was last seen on the night of his disappearance by two men who were picked up at his villa by a taxi that took them to a club called XXL, Riga's largest gay nightclub at 2:30 am on 16 March. Many Western media sources quickly assumed he was dead, although the Russian press claimed he was living in California under the Federal Witness Protection Program.

In 2012, a body found in a forest near Tukums was that of Rozhetskin, according to preliminary DNA tests.

== See also ==
- List of solved missing person cases (2000s)
