= Fritz Ermarth =

American CIA agent

Chair of the National Intelligence Council
- In office 1988–1993
- President: Ronald Reagan; George H. W. Bush
- Preceded by: Frank Horton III
- Succeeded by: Joseph Nye

Personal details
- Born: February 20, 1941 Chicago, Illinois, U.S.
- Died: January 19, 2022 (aged 80)
- Education: Wittenberg University (BA); Harvard University (MA)

Fritz W. Ermarth (February 20, 1941 – January 19, 2022), was the Director of National Security Programs at the Nixon Center from 2002 to his death in 2022. He was also a part-time senior analyst for the Strategies Group at Science Applications International Corporation.

Ermarth worked for the Central Intelligence Agency from 1973 until 1998, serving as Chairman of the National Intelligence Council, as National Intelligence Officer for the USSR and East Europe and Director of the Strategic Evaluation Center. He received both the Distinguished Intelligence Medal and the National Intelligence Distinguished Service Medal. Ermarth also served as Special Assistant to the President during the Ronald Reagan's presidency, as well as Senior Director of Soviet and European Affairs.

Following the 1990s looting of Russia, he stated "We have outright criminals at one end, but at the other end we call them statesmen."

Ermarth died in Cheyenne, Wyoming on January 19, 2022.

== Footnotes ==
Government offices
Preceded by Frank Horton III	Chair of the National Intelligence Council; 1988–1993	Succeeded by Joseph Nye
