= FIMACO =

English company

Financial Management Company Limited (FIMACO or FIMAKO) was a Jersey company founded in 1990.

The company was involved in a series of scandals related to the IMF loan funds, operations on the Russian debt market, and the issue of obtaining commission income from operations with the state currency reserve. The company has also been the subject of analysis as part of investigations into the fate of party financial resources of the Communist Party of the Soviet Union.

== Background ==
According to Fritz W. Ermarth, the "Saga of the KGB Money" began before the breakup of the Soviet Union. (Note: In the mid-1950s, western intelligence agencies began collecting information about deposits outside the Soviet Union by persons with Soviet passports that involved secret numbered bank accounts in Switzerland and other countries. From French data in 1991, the Communist Party of the Soviet Union (CPSU) owned 84 companies outside the Soviet Union, had more than 7,000 bank accounts, and had investments and deposits of more than $25 billion.) (Note: With the collapse of international oil prices beginning on 13 September 1985 when Saudi Arabia's Minister of Petroleum Sheikh Yamani announced a new oil policy and that Saudi Arabia would increase its production and which, over the next six months, oil production in Saudi Arabia rose tremendously, very large outflows of capital from the Soviet Union occurred from 1985 to 1991 to financially support Soviet friendly firms and countries because, previous to the Saudi Arabia's increase in oil production, the Soviet Union relied upon its oil sales to support Soviet friendly firms and countries which needed very large funds.) (Note: A typical Soviet transfer of funds occurred using bankruptcy. Through bankruptcies, funds would be transferred for black cash operations which were susceptible to fraud and personal enrichment. For example, in April 1989, after one transfer of $100 million to Technopromimport (TPI) (Russian: Технопромимпорт (ТПИ)), which was a Soviet foreign economic association under the USSR Ministry of Foreign Trade, through Interplastica, which is a firm that employed a friend of the Soviet Union Behgjet Pacolli, financed by a loan from Banco del Gottardo (Note: According to Felipe Turover Chudionov, Banco del Gottardo, which had been the overseas branch of Banco Ambrosiano, was chosen to run Russian black cash schemes and to maintain commodities and barter schemes while VEB was closed because "We needed a very small bank with a very dirty reputation.") in Lugano, Switzerland, using guarantees from Vnesheconombank, Interplastica declared bankruptcy after Paccoli transferred 25% of the loan to Technopromimport leaving the remaining funds of the loan to "disappear".) Ermarth stated that top-level Communist Party of the Soviet Union (CPSU) officials gave instructions: "Using semi-private cooperatives, the KGB sold cheaply acquired Soviet commodities abroad at world prices, putting the proceeds into disguised foreign accounts and front companies" beginning in the mid-1980s. For example, Paul Klebnikov explained that Marc Rich was the mentor to the 1990s looters of Russia. Before the 1990s to trade between the West and the Soviet Union, Rich established a trading house in Switzerland for each commodity to be traded: oil, aluminum, zinc, chromium, steel, etc. Each trading house had a monopoly on the trade for its commodity between the Soviet Union and the West and would purchase the commodity from the Soviet producers for only 5% to 10% of its market value then sell the commodity through its Swiss trading house at market value and pocket the difference. Marc Rich's firm Nordex followed this scheme. Ermarth stated, "Initially the KGB objective was simply commercial cover. But the program evolved into operating businesses for off-budget revenues, and from there into avenues for squirreling away funds for the safe retirement or political comeback of embattled communist leaders. Lines of business came to include money laundering, arms and drug trafficking, and other plainly criminal activities. Before long, intelligence, business, politics and crime blurred indistinguishably into each other." In the 1990s, the looting of Russia followed a similar scheme and, by 1993, the looters muscled Marc Rich out of commodities trading. Ermarth stated that the Soviet Union was engaging in this scheme in 1985 and, in the 1990s, Russia had many that were "squirreling away funds for the safe retirement or political comeback of embattled communist leaders." (Note: With support from Yuri Shvets, a 19 January 1999 Corriere della Sere article written by Carlo Bonini alleged that Vladimir Putin had instructed Nikolai Patrushev to investigate the corruption with the looting, which is often called Russiagate and was instigated by Chernomyrdin according to Putin, in order to leverage Vagit Alekperov, who was the head of Lukoil that had a large data base on United States citizens acquired from its business interests in the United States, to support Putin's future agenda.)

== History ==
On August 23, 1990, a secret memorandum from Vladimir A. Ivashko, who was Gorbachev's deputy general secretary, outlined strategies to hide the Communist Party's assets through Russian and international joint ventures because Boris Yeltsin, who was the new president of the Russian Republic in the Soviet Union, wanted to levy taxes on the Communist Party's vast administrative property holdings and on the Party itself. The memorandum was to organize the transfer of CPSU funds, CPSU financing and support of its operations through associations, ventures, foundations, etc. which are to act as invisible economics. (Note: Richard L. Palmer, president of Cachet International, Inc., was the CIA station chief at the United States Embassy in Moscow from 1992 to 1994.) In November 1990, the offshore structure Fimaco (also spelled Fimako) was formed by documents signed by Yury Ponomaryov under the direction of V. Gerashchenko of the Russian Central Bank, then known as Gosbank, to hide these funds. In November 1990, Leonid Veselovsky, a colonel in the First Chief Directorate of the KGB and an expert in international economics, was transferred from his KGB post in Portugal to Moscow to be under deputy chairman of the KGB of the USSR Philip Bobkov; however, two weeks before the August Putsch in 1991, Veselovsky quit the KGB and began working for the Switzerland office of Boris Birshtein's Seabeco; but, in the meantime, hundreds of banks, joint stock companies, and joint ventures had been created under the direction of the CPSU Central Committee. (Note: Five days after the failed 21 August 1991 Putsch, Nikolay Kruchina, the chief treasurer of the Communist Party who was responsible for the party's gold (Russian: золото Партии) since 1983 and who had never been publicly linked to the Putsch, died in the early morning as a result of falling out of his apartment window in Moscow, but he left behind two notes and a thick file near his desk on the armchair that contained recent Communist Party's illegal commercial operations.) (Note: Philip Bobkov masterminded the transfer of CPSU funds to foreign locations. Vladimir Gusinsky recruited Philip Bobkov for his Most Group so Bobkov left KGB in 1991 began working as Security for Most Bank in its analytical department in 1992 with most of the 5th Main Directorate of the KGB with him as well as all of the Fifth Main Directorate's files from Lubyanka.)

According to Sergei Tretyakov, KGB chief Vladimir Kryuchkov sent US$50 billion worth of funds of the Communist Party to an unknown location in the lead up to the collapse of the USSR. (Note: Sergei Tretyakov, SVR rezident in United States from 1995-2000, was a double agent for the FBI from 1997-2000.)

Russian officials claimed that FIMACO was 100% owned by the state-owned Banque Commerciale pour l'Europe du Nord, but never provided any proof according to a Newsweek article in March 1999.

From 1989 to 1998, Yury Ponomaryov was the CEO and chairman of the board at the Commercial Bank for Northern Europe (BCEN) - Eurobank in Paris; from 1993, he was chairman of the board of directors of the Moscow bank "Evrofinance" (Russian: "Еврофинанс") (Note: "Evrofinance" (Russian: "Еврофинанс") is also transliterated incorrectly as Eurofinance.) which was a subsidiary of Eurobank; and during 1998 to 1999, he was chairman of the board of the Moscow Narodny Bank. (Note: From February to May 1992, Ponomarev was in Moscow as the chairman of the Committee for Operational Management of Vnesheconombank, then returned to Paris and resumed his duties at the Eurobank at which he had remained Eurobank's CEO and chairman of the board while he was in Moscow.) (Note: From 1999 to 2002, he lived in Moscow and was president, chairman of the board at Vneshtorgbank and also worked for Russian banks abroad as the chairman of the boards of directors (supervisory boards) of banks in Paris, Vienna, Cyprus, Zurich, and Luxembourg after which he became Chairman of the Board of Directors, Managing Director of East-West United Bank, Luxembourg from 2002 until 2005.) Ponomaryov was the principal executor during the privatization of funds of international financial organizations and state foreign exchange reserves of Russia through FIMACO and other shadow companies. BCEN - Eurobank had numerous correspondent accounts with Western banks to secure lines of credit for facilitating financial flows from the Soviet Union and later Russia to both the West and also less developed countries.

In 1990 Alexander Mamut founded the "ALM-Consulting" law firm (ALM abbreviated after Mamut's name) and served as Managing Partner from 1990 to 1993. In 1991, ALM Consulting partnered with Frere Cholmeley Bischoff, a law firm based in London and headed by Tim Razzall from 1990 to 1994, to establish many offshore shell companies with support from ALM Consulting. In 1993, Mamut hired Igor Shuvalov (Note: In 1993, Roman Kolodkin (Russian: Роман Колодкин) introduced Alexander Mamut to Igor Shuvalov who worked at the Russian Ministry of Foreign Affairs in the legal department as an attache. From 5 November 2009 until 15 September 2015, Roman Kolodkin was the Russian Ambassador to the Netherlands.) as a senior advisor and instructed Shuvalov to establish many offshore companies to conduct special assignments to money launder very large amounts of cash away from Russia. In 1995 when Shuvalov was the head of ALM, Mamut introduced Shuvalov to Roman Abramovich, Alisher Usmanov, and Oleg Boyko who established Shuvalov's first investment which was in a business associated with Boyko. ALM was the preferred law firm for Russian oligarchs during the 1990s including Alisher Usmanov, Roman Abramovich, Boris Berezovsky, Oleg Boyko, and others. During the 1990s, Mikhail Kasyanov, while he was the head of the department of external loans and foreign debt at the Russian Ministry of Finance, made decisions in support of Mamut.

In Autumn 1990, Vladislav Surkov established an advertising company with support from Menatep Bank that achieved tremendous return on investments. With offices in Paris, Gibraltar, Budapest, and Geneva, Mikhail Khodorkovsky's MENATAP united a trading house, 2 insurance companies, 18 independent commercial banks, and about 30 industrial and other enterprises according to Delovoy Mir (Russian: «Деловой мир») on 8 June 1991. Organized by the Russian Ministry of Finance, MENATEP proposed methods of privatization and ways to secure foreign funds and support for securities.

On 13 August 1991, Valērijs Kargins and Viktor Krasovitsky (Latvian: Viktors Krasovickis) in Riga, Latvia, opened the first foreign currency exchange as a closed joint stock company in the Soviet Union. They had opened a currency exchange at their Riga train station tourism office, previously on 3 April 1991. He along with Viktor Krasovitsky and Krasovitsky's wife Nina Kontratyeva later founded Parex Bank in January 1992. Riga was intended to become the global financial center in the former Soviet Union and Parex promoted itself as "We are closer than Switzerland!" (Russian: «Мы ближе, чем Швейцария!»)

In a 1991 report, former KGB colonel Veselovsky, whose responsibility was to manage Communist Party commercial affairs overseas, explained that he had found ways to funnel party money abroad. In addition to Nikolai Kruchina and Viktor Geraschenko, Russian prosecutors also considered Veselovsky to be a principal figure in the money transfers. The stated goal was to ensure the financial well-being of party leaders after they lost power. Large amounts of state assets were transferred through FIMACO. One estimate is about US$50 billion. Alexander Litvinenko stated that millions from the IMF loan went to Russian mafia. On 30 September 1991, Yevgeny Primakov became the head of foreign espionage or the KGB First Chief Directorate (FCD) which in December 1991 became the SVR which he headed until January 1996. Both the FCD and later the SVR had significant participation in transferring funds during this time frame because the staff of the FCD had previously created, developed and oversaw the commercial structures for illegal economies supported by the CPSU.

In 1991 in a dacha outside Moscow, Andrey Vavilov, Konstantin Kagalovsky, and three others developed an economic platform for Russia. Beginning in 1990 Kagalovsky was the Soviet Union's and later Russia's representative on financial matters with the IMF and the World Bank. In November 1991, he became Russia's representative on international financial matters and finally between October 1992 and 1995, he was Russia's representative to the IMF.

On April 4, 1992, Yeltsin issued "The fight against corruption in the public service" decree to provide for maximum transparency of officials and their institutions by providing a listing of their financial obligations, liabilities, securities, income, bank deposits, real estate holdings and their personal property and to prohibit officials from owning businesses. The people with access to FIMACO included senior officers of the Communist Party, Komsomol, state banks, KGB, and the military.

In June 1992, four tranches of IMF money totaling $4 billion were approved for transfer to Russia with the first $1 billion to be sent in June 1992.

A 1993 document signed by a senior deputy to Viktor Gerashchenko, the head of the Central Bank of Russia, forbid disclosure of transfers to FIMACO: "The balance of the investment account of the [Central Bank] in FIMACO shouldn't be disclosed on the balance sheet of the bank."

Coopers & Lybrand performed audits of the Central Bank of Russia during the period of 1993 and 1994, discovered FIMACO, and condemned its activities. (Note: British courts determined that Coopers & Lybrand made gross errors during their 1990s audit of the Robert Maxwell group of companies, which were then controlled by Kevin Maxwell after Robert Maxwell's tragic death in 1991, and fined Coopers & Lybrand a record 3.3 million pounds.) (Note: In 1998, Price Waterhouse merged with Coopers & Lybrand forming PricewaterhouseCoopers.) The IMF and the World Bank did not receive the Russian Central Bank's audits for 1993 and 1994.

In 1995, Jules Muis, a Dutch auditor formerly with Ernst & Young that became a vice-president and controller for the World Bank, had his World Bank staff target Russia with audits because of dealings between government officials and consulting firms "where doubts have been raised". Since auditing Russian operations became the World Bank's most critical concern, Donald Strombom, a former procurement chief at the World Bank who later established the International Development Business Consultants and was an advisor to the Russian Ministry of Economy which was headed by Yevgeny Yasin, stated, "Obviously the Bank would not like to shut down operations in Russia." (Note: The World Bank believed that the Russian ministry of foreign trade was very corrupt with many high ranking officials resigning.) In June 1995 James Wolfensohn, who later became a president of the World Bank, wrote a memo that spot audits would occur using the in-house staff at the World Bank. According to Raghavan Srinivasan who was the chief procurement adviser at the World Bank, "We want to put the fear of God in them." (Note: In the 1990s according to Jules Muis, the "Big Five" auditing firms are PricewaterhouseCoopers, Ernst & Young, KPMG, Deloitte Touche Tohmatsu and Arthur Andersen.)

According to Sergei Dubinin, from February 29, to May 28, 1996, just before the 1996 presidential elections in Russia that were held in June and July 1996, the Central Bank of Russia issued approximately $1 billion to Eurobank and then FIMACO invested a comparable amount of funds in GKOs (Russian: Государственное Краткосрочное Обязательство (ГКО)) or Russian State Short-Term Bonds which are often referred to as Russian Government Bonds or T-Bills.

Felipe Turover Chudínov, a senior intelligence officer with the foreign-intelligence directorate of the KGB, alleged that $15 billion of IMF funds had been funneled through Switzerland, Liechtenstein and Caribbean countries as black cash or obschak to support Kremlin friendly operations and companies. Turover maintained that since the Russian state bank responsible for foreign operations, VEB, had severe economic hardship during the collapse of the Soviet Union and that Russia had taken on all Soviet republics' foreign debts of the Soviet Union which caused Russia to claim it was bankrupt in 1991, VEB's accounts were frozen on January 1, 1992, because Russia had no more money to spend. (Note: On 4 December 1991, VEB declared that it would suspend payments on the former Soviet Union's debts indefinitely. On 20 December 1991, the state bank of the USSR was liquidated. On 13 July 1992, the Bank of Russia was formed. In 1994, VEB resumed its operations.) (Note: Vnesheconombank kept the records of the country's financial assets and debts. Repayment of loans from countries using hard currency was very rare and only occurred with "Algeria, Iraq, Libya (including the form of oil supplies for re-export), and Indonesia.") (Note: For approximately seven years during the 1990s, the Kremlin's obshchak («общак») or black cash was stored in the vaults of Vnesheconombank (VEB) because Viktor Gerashchenko stated that in 1992 VEB became an agency for the return of the state debt of the USSR due to a decree by the Supreme Soviet: "Vnesheconombank does not have a central banking license. It does not need it, since it does not conduct any commercial operations." He also added, "Due to the lack of a license, this is the only Russian bank that the Central Bank does not check – it does not have the right.") Turover said that this prevented the typical Cold War cash flows through VEB to pro Kremlin operations and companies and caused, instead, schemes to be established. (Note: One operation Turover explicitly stated was that IMF money was funding white supremacist neo-nazi groups.) In 1992, Turover stated that he was mandated to negotiate with Russia's creditors. (Note: On 4 March 1994, Felipe Turover Chudínov was appointed at the Banco del Gottardo as an advisor with a mandate for "all matters pertaining to our relationship with the government authorities and agencies of the Russian Federation and of our dealings with financial, commercial and economic entities, companies and corporations of the Russian Federation.") According to Turnover, the Lugano based Banco del Gottardo, which had been the overseas branch of Banco Ambrosiano, was chosen to run Russian black cash schemes and to maintain commodities and barter schemes while VEB was closed because "We needed a very small bank with a very dirty reputation." (Note: In the early 2000s, the Russian government recognized the debts that VEB accrued through its guarantees on loans at Banco del Gottardo and included these debts as external public debt.)

From July 1996 to March 1997, Vladimir Putin was head of Russia's presidential property management department and was responsible for both the former Soviet Union's property and the Communist Party's property worth hundreds of billion-dollars after a Yeltsin decree that became effective on 11 December 1996. Turover stated that Putin created schemes involving Joint Ventures, LLCs, and JSCs as front companies in order to claim large stakes in the transfer of state property to other persons and entities: for example, in East Germany, he fraudulently leased the huge cultural center of Russia in Berlin to a company for almost nothing but the company then leased the building for a very large amount. Turover alleged that Putin pocketed the money that the company received from the expensive lease. Because of this very large loss of assets, Russia needed over $300 billion in foreign investments and demanded even more IMF money during 1998 and 1999 in order to not declare bankruptcy in the spring of 1999. However, IMF officials did not approve additional IMF money for Russia.

A key prospective witness in improper financial affairs was Lyubov Tarasova (Russian: Любовь Тарасова) who was a senior auditor for the Central Bank of Russia and worked for the "Unicom" (Russian: "Юникон") auditing firm which had been established on 20 August 1991 and was responsible for "checking the correctness of the documentation and the essence of business transactions that are in doubt" (Russian: "проверка правильности документального оформления и сущности хозяйственных операций, вызывающих сомнение"), but was stabbed to death in her apartment in Moscow on 15–16 October 1997.

In 1998, Edmond Safra's banks alerted the FBI about a $4.8 billion money laundering scheme involving IMF money, his Republic National Bank of New York, his Republic National Bank of New York (Suisse) in Geneva, Mikhail Kasyanov and Vladimir Putin. He also provided evidence to the Geneva prosecutor Bertrand Bertossa. In mid July 1998, IMF money transfers of $22 billion to Russia were approved which were negotiated by John Odling-Smee of the IMF and Anatoly Chubais of Russia. According to la Repubblica, an account in Safra's Bank of New York received $21.4 billion between 27 July 1998 and 24 August 1998. Turover stated that the scheme would not have occurred without the Russian Finance Minister Mikhail Kasyanov's approval. Safra told British press that a "contract had been put on his life" and that he feared that Russian mafia would kill him.

Fitch Ratings estimated $136 billion had been looted from Russia between 1993 and 1998 and Lloyd's of London estimated $200 billion to $500 billion had been looted from Russia between 1993 and 1998. In August 1999, the Russian national police (MVD) concluded that large sums had left Russia and, according to intelligence sources, an estimated $350 billion had been looted from Russia during the 1990s which led Fritz Ermarth, a former CIA analyst for Russia in the 1990s, to state that "We have outright criminals at one end, but at the other end we call them statesmen."

FIMACO's existence was disclosed by Russia's chief prosecutor Yuri Skuratov in February 1999 when Skuratov stated about $50 billion was transferred from the Central Bank to FIMACO and then out of Russia including IMF funds between 1993 and 1998 and that he had given to Carla del Ponte, the Prosecutor General of Switzerland, a list of about twenty names which had received a total of $40 billion of the IMF money in accounts at Swiss banks. (Note: Skuratov listed 11.98 billion French francs, 9.98 billion Deutsche marks, 862.6 million British pounds, $37.3 billion, and 379.9 billion yen.) Soon afterwards, FSB chief Vladimir Putin attacked Skuratov with a campaign which included a video where Skuratov allegedly has sex with two prostitutes. The video which was released to the public in February 1999 led to Skuratov's dismissal on 2 April 1999. (Note: Skuratov's dismissal occurred just days before a second search of the owner of Mabatex the Albanian businessman Behgjet Pacolli linked interests during an ongoing money laundering investigation which had begun in 1992 in Bern involving Pacolli and Yakut officials involved in gold and diamonds especially the Mayor of Yakutsk Pavel Pavlovich Borodin who was Putin's architect for the transfer of the Presidential Property Management Department assets to LLCs, JSCs, and Joint Ventures during early 1997. According to Turover, the Mabatex scandal was just the beginning of a very large scandal involving Putin which was referred to as Russiagate.)

On July 20, 1999, the IMF directors received the July 9, 1999, PricewaterhouseCoopers (PWC) report about FIMACO's activities. Following two 6 August 1999 Le Monde articles "Le FMI et la Russie" and "Comment la Russie detournait l'argent du FMI" which were critical of the relationships among the International Monetary Fund (IMF), the World Bank, and the Russian Central Bank, both John Odling-Smee, who was director of the European II department at the IMF, and Michel Camdessus, who was the managing director of the IMF from 16 January 1987 to 14 February 2000, responded with a 5 August 1999 letter and a 19 August 1999 Le Monde article respectively. PWC performed three audits "PricewaterhouseCoopers report on relations between the Central Bank of Russia and the Financial Management Company Ltd (FIMACO)" posted on the IMF website on 5 August 1999, "PricewaterhouseCoopers report on the funds transferred to the Central Bank of Russia by the IMF in July 1998, and the use, by the Central Bank of Russia, of those funds between July 1 and September 1, 1998" posted on the IMF website on August 17, 1999, "PricewaterhouseCoopers report on the statistics compiled by the Central Bank of Russia for the IMF in the period from January 1, 1996 to September 1, 1998" posted on the IMF website on 17 August 1999, but these three audits were removed from the IMF website on 30 September 1999. On 31 August 2000, the IMF published annual totals of money transferred to the Russia.

In July 2000 because of the central banks of both Russia and Ukraine lied about their reserves, the IMF/World Bank required that all central banks must publish their annual financial statements and have outside auditors review those statements using internationally accepted standards.

Mikhail Khodorkovsky's Yukos Oil conglomerate received some of the money and he gave Viktor Gerashchenko chairmanship of Yukos for the help Khodorkovsky received from Gerashchenko. (Note: "The Saker" lists the seven Russian oligarchs of the 1990s as Boris Berezovsky, Vladimir Gusinsky, Mikhail Khodorkovsky, Mikhail Fridman, Alexander Smolensky, Petr Aven, and Vladimir Potanin. According to Dmitry Butrin of Kommersant, the group known as the Semibankirshchina (Russian: Семибанкирщина) are Boris Berezovsky, Vladimir Gusinsky, Vladimir Vinogradov, Mikhail Fridman, Alexander Smolensky, and Vitaly Malkin and during a follow up article added three more Peter Aven, Vladimir Potanin, and Mikhail Khodorkovsky.)

Reports by Swiss and German intelligence implicated numerous persons in the Russian mafia through Grigory Luchansky's Vienna, Austria based Nordex and Boris Birshtein's Zurich Switzerland based Seabeco AG, KGB, FSB, and others in the scheme to move billions away from the Soviet Union and into a secret economy. (Note: Grigory Emmanuilovich Luchansky, also spelled Grigori Loutchansky (Russian: Григорий Лучанский), is Latvian-Israeli-Georgian with ties to money laundering with the Latvian Parex Bank according to the Panama Papers. He was very close to Marc Rich and Pincus Green and their Switzerland based Glencore.) Some of the funds were sent to the United States through Semyan "Sam" Kislan from Odesa, Michael Cherney and Lev Cherney using the United States firm Newtel Company and Alexander Smolensky's Stolichny Bank. Russian prosecutors had previously tried to implicate Birshtein, Veselovsky, Luchansky, and others of illegally money laundering Communist Party funds.

On 15 December 2011, the Frankfurt am Main prosecutor's office and German criminal authorities named Leonid Reiman as a suspect in a 1990s money laundering scheme involving Commerzbank, his longtime attorney Jeffrey Galmond, and four employees of Commerzbank. The case had begun as an investigation into the looting of Russia during the 1990s.

In the 2015 report "Dark Matter" which took into account the very large net errors and omissions (NEO) for Russian capital flight during the looting of Russia in the 1990s, the Russian capital flight tracked with the United Kingdom's inflows. (Note: Dominated by omissions not errors because of the non random nature of the NEOs, Switzerland, Norway, the United Kingdom, New Zealand, and Sweden all have very large NEOs when compared with their GDP with Sweden having the largest NEOs accumulated since the early 1990s totaling nearly 40% of GDP.)

In a 2004 interview of Russia's IMF director Alexey Mozhin (Russian: Алексей Можин) by Andrei Denisov of Vremya Novostei about the IMF money transferred on 22, 23 and 24 July 1998 and 14 August 1998 and the subsequent locations of the money, Mozhin cites the Central Bank of Russia's PricewaterhouseCoopers audit. (Note: The July 1999 PricewaterhouseCoopers audit confirmed that, in 1996, $1 billion of IMF funds were deposited with FIMACO but Stanley Fischer, deputy managing director at the IMF, stated that the money had been illegally sent to FIMACO and that Russians had lied about the matter. The IMF lent over $20 billion to Russia from 1992 according to the report.) In a 31 August 1999 interview with Libération, Michel Camdessus, the managing director of IMF, refused to call the flight of capital a theft and dismissed any money laundering, but was "worried" that Russia had lied to the IMF about the state of its reserves (French: «la Banque centrale russe nous a menti sur l'état de ses réserves en 1996 et ses transactions légales mais dissimulées avec la Fimaco»). In early September 1999, Patrice Delozière, who is a Paris-based representative of the Central Bank of Russia at Eurobank, told Libération that "the PricewaterhouseCoopers audit was only provisional" (French: «le rapport Price Waterhouse n'est que provisoire») The stolen IMF funds caused the 1998 Russian financial crisis which began on 17 August 1998.

== See also ==
- Corruption in Russia
- Kroll Inc.
- Philippines Cronyism

== Books and journals ==
- Klebnikov, Paul (16 September 2000). Godfather of the Kremlin: the Life and Times of Boris Berezovsky and the Looting of Russia. New York: Houghton Mifflin Harcourt. ISBN 9780151006212.
- Browder, Bill (3 February 2013). Red Notice: A True Story of High Finance, Murder, and One Man's Fight for Justice. Simon & Schuster. ISBN 978-1476755717.
- Dawisha, Karen (2014). Putin's Kleptocracy: Who Owns Russia?. Simon & Schuster. ISBN 978-1-4767-9519-5.
- Bernstein, Jake (21 November 2017). Secrecy World: Inside the Panama Papers Investigation of Illicit Money Networks and the Global Elite. Henry Holt and Company. ISBN 978-1250126689.
- Bullough, Oliver (7 May 2019). Moneyland: The Inside Story of the Crooks and Kleptocrats Who Rule the World. St. Martin's Press. ISBN 978-1250208705.
- Belton, Catherine (23 June 2020). Putin's People: How the KGB Took Back Russia and Then Took on the West. New York: Farrar, Straus, Giroux. ISBN 978-0374238711.
- Earley, Pete (2008). Comrade J: The Untold Secrets of Russia's Master Spy in America After the End of the Cold War. Putnam. ISBN 9780399154393.
- Скуратов, Юрий Ильич (Skuratov, Yury Ilyich) (2013). Кремлёвские подряды: Последнее дело прокурора [Kremlin contracts. The last case of the Attorney General] (in Russian). Moscow: ООО «Издательство Алгоритм» (Algorithm Publishing House). ISBN 978-5-4438-0301-2.
- Илларионов, Андрей (Illarionov, Andrey) (4 May 2011). ""Трудный путь к свободе" Часть вторая" [Hard road to freedom: Part two] (PDF). «Континент» Литературный, публицистический и религиозный журнал (continent.russ.ru) №146 2010, № 4 октябрь — декабрь (in Russian). Archived from the original (PDF) on 25 March 2022.
- Илларионов, Андрей (Illarionov, Andrey) (4 May 2011). ""Трудный путь к свободе" Часть вторая" [Hard road to freedom: Part two]. «Континент» Литературный, публицистический и религиозный журнал (continent.russ.ru) №146 2010, № 4 октябрь — декабрь (in Russian). Archived from the original on 10 November 2012.
