= Peterstar =

PeterStar is a competitive local exchange carrier (CLEC) in St. Petersburg, Russia established in 1992.

== History ==
It was co-founded in 1992 by the Luxembourg based "ComPlus Holding" SA as the first non-state owned cell phone operator in St. Petersburg. (Note: PeterStar was one of several Joint Ventures (JV) in the Telecominvest holding (Russian: холдинг «Телекоминвест») which was created in 1994 as a holding for St. Petersburg telecoms. The Leningrad State Telephone Network (LGTS) (Russian: Ленинградской государственной телефонной сети (ЛГТС)) employee Leonid Reiman created these joint ventures and was responsible for the privatization of these formerly state owned companies into joint ventures with foreigners.)

In 1992 - 1995 the company was headed by Anatoly Afanasyev. Initially, the St. Petersburg City Telephone Network had 45% stake in PeterStar. Valery Yashin, who was elected as the Director General of the St. Petersburg City Telephone Network (Russian: ОАО "Петербургская телефонная сеть") in 1992, was a member of the Managing Committee, Leonid Reiman, First Deputy Director General of the St. Petersburg City Telephone Network, was a member of the board of directors. The remaining 55% stake belonged to the Tiller company of the British businessman Anthony Georgiou. Yashin was a former director of the Leningrad State Telephone Network (LGTS) (Russian: Ленинградской государственной телефонной сети (ЛГТС)) and was general director of Svyazinvest (Russian: «Связьинвест»), which was formed on 18 September 1995 with federal ownership stakes in 85 joint-stock telecommunication companies, and Nikolai Pevtsov is a director of one of the LGTS companies. James Hutt is a director of one of the companies co-owners of PeterStar. Through Complus Holding, which co-founded PeterStar in 1992, Yashin, Pevtsov and Reiman controlled PeterStar through the Danish firm Danco Finans, which controlled Complus Holding, with Reiman as the beneficiary.

PeterStar offers a wide range of fixed telecommunication services including voice, data (ISDN, Frame Relay, ATM, Ethernet), calling cards, PBX sales (Avaya and Ericsson). PeterStar maintains the entire 32x-xxxx St. Petersburg numbering range and has over 2,000 kilometers of fibre optic cables under the city streets. Competitors include Golden Telecom, Metrocom, Equant, Westcall, and others.

== Management ==
Since 2001 its Director General has been Victor Koresh (b. 1953).

In 2010 PeterStar was sold as part of the Synterra group (Russian: Синтерра) to MegaFon, one of the three largest mobile providers in Russia.
