= Andrey Vavilov =

Russian politician and businessman

- Андрей Вавилов
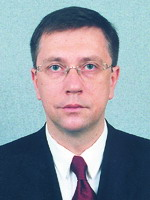

Member of the Federation Council
- In office 28 of May 2002 – 17 March 2010

Personal details
- Born: Andrey Petrovich Vavilov; January 10, 1961 (age 65) Perm, Russian SFSR, Soviet Union
- Spouse(s): Marianna Tsaregradskaya (died 2017); 2 children Inge Barkovskaya (divorced); Sophie-Antoinette Dilua (2021-present)
- Education: Ordzhonikidze Moscow Institute of Management; Central Economic Mathematical Institute (PhD)
- Awards: Presidential Letter of Gratitude

Andrey Petrovich Vavilov (Russian: Андрей Петрович Вавилов; born 10 January 1961) is a Russian politician and businessman, senator and a former first Deputy Finance Minister of Russia.

== Early life ==
In 1985, he worked as an engineer and a junior researcher at the Central Economic Mathematical Institute, and in 1988 he took the position of a senior researcher at the Institute of Economics and Research and Technology Advancement Forecasts.

In 1991, he headed a laboratory at the newly founded Institute for Market Problems of the USSR Academy of Sciences. From 1991 to 1992, he worked as a researcher at the Institute for International Economics in Washington D.C. That same year, in 1991, in a dacha outside Moscow, Vavilov, Konstantin Kagalovsky, and three others developed an economic platform for Russia.

== First Deputy Finance Minister of Russia ==
In 1992 to 1997, Vavilov occupied offices in the Russian Ministry of Finance. From 5 November 1994 to 1 May 1997, Vavilov occupied the post of first deputy finance minister of Russia under Mikhail Kasyanov.

While in office at the Finance Ministry, one of his responsibilities was negotiating with the International Monetary Fund, the Paris and London Clubs. Under the supervision of Vavilov, the Russian Federation was assigned to its first international investment ratings in 1996. He initiated and arranged the issue of the first Russian eurobonds on the international market. From 1992 to 1997, Vavilov participated in the preparation of the G7 meetings concerning the financial aspects of the summit that resulted in relieving the financial burden of Russia by $25 billion per year.

He represented Russia and Augustu da Silva Tomas represented Angola during the 1995-1996 Angola-Russia debt negotiations which led to "Angolagate". Angola had a $5.5 billion debt with the Soviet Union and later with Russia and the former president of the bank Russian Credit (Russian: банка «Российский кредит») Arkady Gaydamak, also known as Arye Bar-Lev (Russian: Арие Барлев), was to be the executor of the financial transactions.

In 1997, under an agreement to purchase oil from Angola's oil firm Sonangol worth $1.5 billion, the Isle of Man registered firm Abalone Investments Limited which acted as an intermediary between Angola and Russia, transferred only $161 million out of the $773 million in the first and only tranche to the Russian Finance Ministry's account with Unikombank (Russian: Уникомбанк) with Abalone Investments keeping the remainder as a commission. According to French judge Daniel Deveaux, Gaydamak received 60% or $614 million stolen as a commission during the Russian scheme. Some money went to Dos Santos. The Swiss prosecutor Bernard Bertossa froze $750 million in Swiss accounts in Geneva during his investigation into $1.5 billion that allegedly went to Boris Yeltsin's 1996 campaign.

In 1996, he was the treasurer of Boris Yeltsin's election campaign. During tenure at the ministry of finance, he was close to both Oleg Boyko and Alexander Lebedev.

On 3 February 1997, his car exploded outside of the Russian Ministry of Finance building but he was inside the building.

He wrote off over $8 billion of Libya and Iraq debts with MFK Bank before he stepped down as first deputy finance minister.

== Businessman ==
On 15 May 1997, he replaced Alexander Khloponin (Russian: Алекса́ндр Генна́дьевич Хлопо́нин) and became the President the MFK Bank (Russian: «Международная финансовая компания») that is part of Mikhail Prokhorov's ONEKSIMbank-MFK group (Russian: группы ОНЭКСИМбанк – МФК). In July 1997, MFK combined with Stephen Jennings and Boris Jordan's Renaissance Capital (Russian: «Ренессанс Капитал») to form MFK-Renaissance Bank (Russian: банк «МФК-Ренессанс») with Boris Jordan as its president. Vavilov became a board member of Mikhail Prokhorov and Vladimir Potanin's Interros (Russian: ФПГ «Интеррос»).

Between 1998 and 2002 he was the Head of the Institute for Financial Studies. On 16 March 1998, he became a financial advisor to the chairman of the management board of Gazprom.

Between May 2000 to 2002, he was the chairman of the Board of Severnaya Neft which he obtained for $25 million and sold for $600 million to Igor Sechin's Rosneft. In 2002, he was elected as a member of the Federation Council of Russia representing the Penza Region Legislative Assembly.

== Real estate holdings ==
- By February 1995, he had obtained a two-story penthouse at Trump Tower in New York City and a house in Los Angeles.
- As of 2007, he has a home in Australia.
- In 2009, he became the beneficial owner of a 8,275 square feet $37.5 million penthouse in the Time Warner Center in New York City.

== Writer ==
He is the author of the 2010 book, The Russian Public Debt and Financial Meltdowns.
