= North-West Telecom =

Russian telecommunications company

OJSC North West Telecom
- Company type: Joint stock
- Traded as: RTS: SPTL; MICEX: SPTL
- Industry: Telecommunications services
- Founded: 2001
- Defunct: April 1, 2011
- Fate: Merged with Rostelecom
- Successor: Rostelecom
- Headquarters: Saint Petersburg, Russia
- Key people: Evgeny Valerevich Yurchenko, (Chairman); Vladimir Alexandrovich Akulich, CEO
- Products: Telecommunciations services Internet services Cable television services
- Revenue: ▲820.4 million (2008)
- Number of employees: 14,086
- Website: www.nwtelecom.ru

North West Telecom (Russian: ОАО «Северо-западный телеком») was a telecommunication company owned by Svyazinvest, providing telecommunications service to northwest Russia. In 2011 it was merged into Rostelecom.

== History ==
North-West Telecom was created on the basis of the merger of Petersburg Telephone Network (Russian: Петербургская телефонная сеть) together with the following entities:

- Artelekom
- Murmanelektrosvyaz
- Novgorodtelecom
- Elektrosvyaz of Pskov Oblast
- Elektrosvyaz of Vologda Oblast
- Cherepovetselektrosvyaz
- Electrosvyaz of Kaliningrad Oblast
- OAO Svyaz of the Republic of Komi
- OAO SPB Telegraf (Russian: СПб Телеграф)
- OAO Petersburg Intercity International Telephone (SPB MMT)
- OAO Lensvyaz
- Delta Telekom
- Pskov City Telephone Network
- Arkhangelsk City Telephone Network

North-West Telecom merged into Rostelecom on April 1, 2011, together with the seven other Svyazinvest regional telecommunications operators.
