= MegaFon =

Russian telecommunication provider

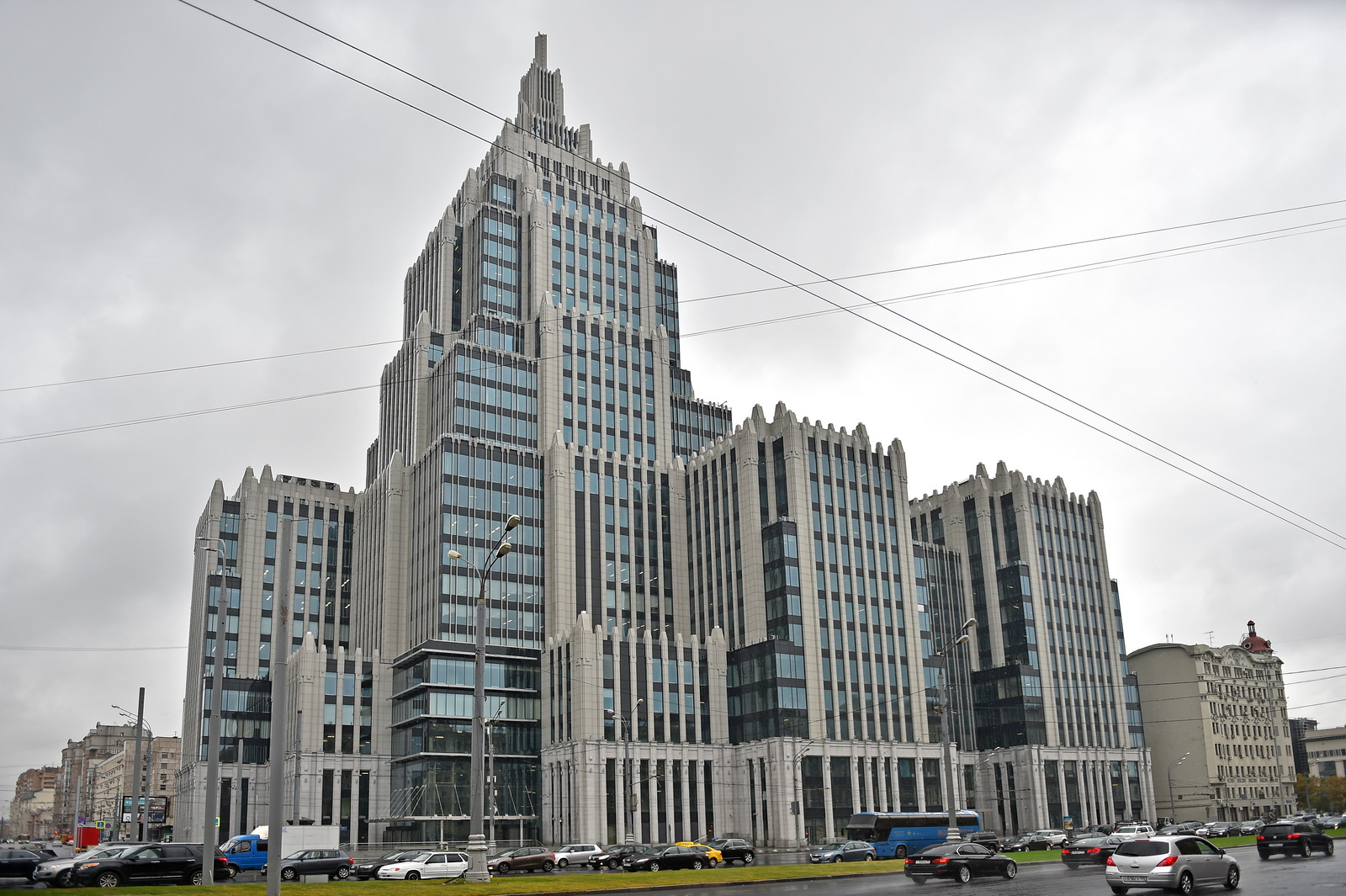
- Business Center Oruzheyny in Moscow , MegaFon's headquarters
- Type: OJSC
- Traded as: MCX: MFON
- Industry: Mobile telecommunications
- Founded: June 17, 1993; 33 years ago
- Headquarters: Moscow, Russia
- Area served: Russia, Tajikistan, South Ossetia
- Key people: Khachatur Pombuhchian, CEO (2021)
- Products: Mobile networks, fixed-line telephony
- Revenue: ₽ 222 billion (Q2 2024)
- Operating income: ₽ 192 billion (Q2 2024)
- Net income: ₽ 98 billion (Q2 2024)
- Total assets: ₽ 461 billion (Q2 2024)
- Owner: USM Holdings Limited (%70.32); MegaFon Finans (%29.68)
- Subsidiaries: Synterra Media
- Website: megafon.ru (Russia) megafon.tj (Tajikistan)

MegaFon (Russian: МегаФон) is the second largest mobile phone operator and the third largest telecommunications company in Russia, headquartered in Moscow. As of 2024, the company serves 77.26 million subscribers across Russia and Tajikistan. MegaFon operates across 83 federal subjects of Russia, Tajikistan and South Ossetia.

In 2002, the company changed its name from North-West GSM to MegaFon when it acquired several regional companies, becoming the first GSM company in Russia to cover all its territory. The name "MegaFon" in Russian is spelled and pronounced exactly like the Russian word for megaphone; other connotations are mega- as "big" and fon as "telephone".

== History ==
Logo in latin alphabet

June 17, 1993, was the registration date of North–West GSM CJSC (Saint Petersburg). Alexander Malyshev became the first General Director of the company. The major international investors included Scandinavian companies Sonera (Finland), Telia International AB (Sweden) and Telenor Invest AS (Norway). Telecommunication equipment was supplied by Nokia.

1994 – launch of commercial operation of GSM (2G) network, the first in Russia.

1999 – number of the company's subscribers became over 100,000. By that time the network of the North-West GSM had completely covered Saint Petersburg and Leningrad region, it was also actively expanding in the northern areas of the Russian North-West.

July 1999 – North-West GSM was the first Russian operator that signed roaming agreements with all countries in Europe. The same year, for the first time ever in Russia, mobile communication started to operate in Saint Petersburg metro, and the operator's spectrum of value-added services included WAP-access to the Internet.

2000 – shareholders of the company adopted a new strategy that was targeted at the mass market.

November 2001 – number of North-West GSM subscribers exceeded 500,000.

May 2002 – The number of North-West GSM subscribers exceeded 1 million.

May 7, 2002 – in the course of rebranding North-West GSM CJSC was renamed to MegaFon OJSC. The rebranding of the company was started on April 28, 2002, by change of the logo. At that moment, North-West GSM was merged with Sonic Duo CJSC (Moscow), Ural GSM CJSC (Yekaterinburg), Mobicom-Kavkaz CJSC (Krasnodar), Mobicom-Center CJSC, Mobicom-Novosibirsk CJSC, Mobicom-Khabarovsk CJSC, MCS-Povolzhie OJSC, Volzhsky GSM (Saransk, Republic of Mordovia).

On October 2, 2007, MegaFon launched for operation the first Russian fragment of the third generation network in IMT-2000/UMTS (3G) at the territory of Saint Petersburg and Leningrad region. For the first time ever in this country the radio access sub-system UTRAN (UMTS Terrestrial Radio Access Network) was launched for trial commercial operation and included 30 base stations. And already on October 24, 2007, MegaFon announced about start of 3G service in Saint Petersburg and Leningrad region. For the first time in Russia, the following services became available for mass users: Internet access at the data transmission speed that is ten times higher than in the existing GSM networks (2G and 2,5G) of GPRS/EDGE technology, high-quality Mobile TV, video communication.

December 2008 – the extraordinary General Shareholders Meeting of MegaFon took a resolution on reorganization of MegaFon OJSC in the form of its merger with Sonic Duo CJSC (Moscow), Ural GSM CJSC (Yekaterinburg), Mobicom-Kavkaz CJSC (Krasnodar), Mobicom-Center CJSC, Mobicom-Novosibirsk CJSC, Mobicom-Khabarovsk CJSC, MCS-Povolzhie OJSC. The number of subscribers exceeded 43.2 million.

On March 16, 2009, MegaFon founded a virtual mobile network operator "PROSTO" (literally translated as "just" or "simply") on the basis of the Stolichny Branch.

On July 1, 2009, reorganization was completed, and now mobile communication services in Russia are provided by the North-West, Stolichny, Kavkaz, Center, Volga, Ural, Siberia and Far East branches of MegaFon OJSC.

On September 25, 2009, it was announced about rebranding of TT mobile CJSC, subsidiary of MegaFon that provided telecom services under the brand of MLT – "Mobile Lines of Tajikistan". The new company's name is MegaFon-Tajikistan.

Since March 1, 2010, Ostelecom CJSC started to provide telecom services in the Tskhinvali region (occupied territory of Georgia) under MegaFon brand.

In June 2010, MegaFon acquired 100% shares of Synterra company, which was a move to strengthen network infrastructure and enhance the positions in the markets of long-distance communication, fixed and mobile broadband access to the Internet, as well as convergence services.

Three months later, the extraordinary General Shareholders Meeting of MegaFon unanimously approved acquisition of 100% shares of PeterStar CJSC from Synterra.

Based on the results of Q3 2010 MegaFon became the second-ranked operator in mobile revenue.

Based on Q3 2010 results MegaFon became the leader in the revenue share from value-added services (VAS) among the Big Three operators.

As a result of 2010, MegaFon became the Top 2 operator (after MTS) in number subscribers among the Russian cellular communication providers.

As a result of 2010, MegaFon acquired the Top Second position in terms of revenue among the Russian Big Three operators.

On July 20, 2011, it was announced about rebranding of TT mobile CJSC. MLT brand was renamed to MegaFon-Tajikistan.

In November 2011, MegaFon signed a partnership agreement with Scartel on joint development of the Fourth Generation networks LTE (Long Term Evolution) in Russia. As a result, the company got the opportunity to provide LTE 4G services using Scartel's equipment. In its turn, Scartel will be able to use MegaFon's infrastructure.

In December 2011, the company created MegaLabs, 100% subsidiary, which is the single center of design and launch of value-added services.

In August 2012 MegaFon released its first smartphone called Megafon Mint in Russia with the new Intel Atom (system on chip). In December 2013 the company received a licence for cable television broadcasting.

In January 2014 the company has launched international roaming data networks in the fourth generation. The first countries where service is available are Switzerland and South Korea. The same month MegaFon CEO Ivan Tavrin announced that the company obtained a 12% stake of VK.com, Russia's most popular social networking website, from VK's founder Pavel Durov.

In February 2014 board of directors of MegaFon has approved a deal to buy a 100% voting stake in SMARTS Volgograd, a unit of mobile firm SMARTS which covers the Volga and central regions of the country.

In the same month, MegaFon commercially launched fragment network LTE Advanced (LTE-A) within the Garden Ring in Moscow. Formerly MegaFon network tested LTE-A in the 2014 Winter Olympics in Sochi. For this Megafon uses bands in the range 2600 MHz own unique combination of frequency spectrum and network resource of Skartel as a mobile virtual network operator (MVNO).

In 2021, the company's revenue amounted to 313 billion rubles.

In March 2022 MegaFon is expelled from the GSMA association.

== Hardware branding ==
Starting in 2015, the company began production of hardware under "MegaFon" brand. These include fixed and mobile phones

== Ownership ==
The company went public in 2012, listing on stock exchanges in Moscow and London. In July 2018, the company's board of directors announced that being a public company was no longer considered a strategic priority and that it would seek to repurchase its GDRs shares from the market and delist, initially from the London Stock Exchange. GDRs were delisted in London in October 2018. The GDR repurchase consolidated more than 75% of ownership in the company, which triggered a mandatory offer to minority shareholders in December 2018. Shares were delisted from the Moscow Exchange in June 2019. Formally shares in the company are now split between USM Telecom (43.68%) and a wholly owned USM subsidiary, AF Telecom Holding (56.32%).

== Sponsorship ==
- Kontinental Hockey League hockey league
- For the 2009 Formula One season, MegaFon was one of the sponsors for the Renault F1 Team.
- Megafon was a national partner for 2014 Winter Olympics in Sochi in 2014
- Russian e-sports team Virtus.pro
- English Premier League team Everton- Suspended

== Criticism ==
In July 2007, careless advertising of the operator's services caused an international scandal. At the request of the Azerbaijani Embassy in Russia, the company's commercial was taken off the air, in which Azerbaijan is listed on the geographical map as the territory of Armenia. In the video, only the capital of Armenia, Yerevan, was present on the map and there was no mention of Baku. Megafon recognized the claims as fair.

In 2008, the Georgian side accused the company of providing communications services in South Ossetia and Abkhazia in a "pirated" way. The Georgian side was supported by the US authorities.

In the summer of 2012, an Online Click service was launched for all subscribers, making it easier to debit funds from a phone account. It has been suggested that it is widely used by scammers. The option to ban "Internet Clicks" appeared only in early 2013.

In 2012, 2016, and 2017, the company was criticized for placing additional embedded ads on HTTP sites when using the mobile Internet.

=== Claims about data roaming charges ===
In 2010, Megafon went to court, intending to recover 1 million rubles from one of its subscribers in compensation for roaming services provided to the subscriber on the island of Crete (the owners of the Megafon 3G modem, while on vacation, downloaded several episodes of the popular TV series with it). During the proceedings in the Leninsky District Court of Vladimir, the court established facts indicating the illegality of Megafon's claims: the contract with the subscriber did not provide for roaming services; the contract with the subscriber was drawn up with significant violations of the law.; The operator provided services on credit to the subscriber with an advance payment system at its own expense; the operator on the island of Crete, to which Megafon referred, had long since ceased operations. These and a number of other facts were the basis for the denial of claims, after which the company itself dropped the claim.

As a follow—up to this case, the Vladimir division of the public organization Consumer Rights Protection Society - People's Control filed a lawsuit with the Leninsky District Court of Vladimir, insisting that Megafon and its Vladimir branch must specify all terms of service in the subscription agreement, including roaming Internet access conditions. In September 2011, the said court ruled in favor of an unspecified number of persons, recognizing "the actions of PJSC Megafon not to include in the standard form of a public contract for the provision of mobile communications and telematics services essential conditions provided for by the legislation of the Russian Federation" illegal and obliging the company to include this information in the standard form of a public contract.

=== Speed ===
According to a study by the service developer Speedtest.net According to Ookla, the results of which were quoted by Kommersant and Forbes in July 2019, Megafon provides customers with the fastest mobile Internet in Russia. The average data transfer rate in the Megafon network, according to the results of the study, turned out to be 1.5 times higher than similar indicators of other operators.

According to measurements conducted by Roskomnadzor from February 6 to May 15, 2020, Megafon in Moscow recorded the lowest percentage of LTE coverage along the route (48.73%) and the minimum average data transfer rate from the subscriber. Similar measurements in St. Petersburg from April 3 to June 5, 2019 also showed Megafon's lowest average data transfer rates among all operators.

In 2021, according to the results of the independent company Ookla, Megafon showed the best quality of mobile Internet in Russia, overtaking other operators in all major parameters. The research was conducted from January to June based on more than 7 million measurements from 1.4 million smartphones.

In 2023, according to the results of an independent Ookla study, Megafon was recognized as the best operator in Russia in terms of network coverage for the second year in a row and for the seventh year in a row in terms of Internet speed.

== Sanctions ==
Against the background of Russia's invasion of Ukraine, the National Agency for the Prevention of Corruption of Ukraine took the initiative to impose international sanctions against Megafon. The justification says that Megafon "carries out export activities and provides an influx of foreign currency, as well as a high revenue side of the budget of the Russian Federation, which is responsible for the war in Ukraine.".

On April 12, 2023, Megafon was included in the US sanctions list as associated with Alisher Usmanov, who fell under the blocking sanctions of the United States, the European Union and several other countries after Russia's attack on Ukraine. On July 12, 2023, the company was sanctioned by Switzerland. On July 20, 2023, Megafon was placed on Canada's sanctions list of "organizations associated with the Russian military-industrial complex, including financial and telecommunications companies.". On November 23, 2023, the company was included in the sanctions list of Ukraine.

== See also ==
- List of mobile network operators in Europe
