= Candidates in the 2004 Russian presidential election =

2004 Russian presidential candidates
- Opinion polls

This article contains the list of candidates associated with the 2004 Russian presidential election.

== Registered candidates ==
Candidates are listed in the order they appear on the ballot paper (alphabetical order in Russian).

Candidate name and age	Political party	Political offices	Nomination date	Registration date
Sergey Glazyev (43) (campaign)	Nominated by: Initiative group Backed by: Rodina (factions)	Leader of the Rodina parliamentary group (2003–2004); Deputy of the State Duma (1994–1996 and 2000–2007); Minister of Foreign Economic Relations (1992–1993)	31 December 2003	8 February 2004
Sergey Glazyev (43) (campaign)	Glazyev was Minister of Foreign Economic Relations of Russia under Boris Yeltsin, a Communist member of the State Duma and in 2003 became co-chairman of the newly established Rodina alliance. However, he failed to win the Rodina nomination because of a power struggle with Dmitry Rogozin, and ran as independent candidate. He campaigned as a critic of economic reforms. He argued that post-Communist governments have ignored social justice and promised to improve welfare.			
Oleg Malyshkin (52) (campaign)	Nominated by: Liberal Democratic Party	Deputy of the State Duma (2003–2007); Head of Tatsinsky District (1997–2001)	27 December 2003	8 January 2004
Oleg Malyshkin (52) (campaign)	Malyshkin was nominated by the Liberal Democratic Party, after the party leader Vladimir Zhirinovsky, who contested the last three presidential elections, chose not to run again. Malyshkin, a mining engineer, had been an LDPR member since 1991 and the head of security of Vladimir Zhirinovsky. He was elected to the State Duma in 2003.			
Sergey Mironov (51) (campaign)	Nominated by: Russian Party of Life	Chairman of the Federation Council (2001–2011); Senator from Saint Petersburg (2001–2011)	5 January 2004	6 February 2004
Sergey Mironov (51) (campaign)	Mironov was Chairman of the Federation Council, the upper house of the Russian parliament, and was considered a loyalist to Vladimir Putin. Prior to launching his campaign, he expressed his support for Putin's candidacy.			
Vladimir Putin (51) (campaign)	Nominated by: Initiative group Backed by: United Russia	President of Russia (2000–2008 and 2012–present); Prime Minister of Russia (1999-2000 and 2008-2012); Director of the Federal Security Service (1998-1999)	22 December 2003	2 February 2004
Vladimir Putin (51) (campaign)	Putin, formerly prime minister, was elected president in 2000, and ran for a second term. His popularity remained quite high during his term in office thanks to economic stability and despite controversies on media freedoms. He refused United Russia's invitation to be nominated as party candidate and ran as an independent.			
Irina Khakamada (48) (campaign)	Nominated by: Initiative group Backed by: SPS (factions)	Deputy of the State Duma (1994–1997 and 2000–2003)	1 January 2004	8 February 2004
Irina Khakamada (48) (campaign)	Khakamada, the daughter of a Japanese Communist who took Soviet citizenship in the 1950s, emerged as Putin's most outspoken critic. A member of the State Duma for eight years, she lost her seat in 2003. She was a member of the Union of Right Forces, but did not run as a party candidate. "I am not afraid of the terrorists in power," she told the daily newspaper Kommersant. "Our children must grow up as free people. Dictatorship will not be accepted."			
Nikolay Kharitonov (55) (campaign)	Nominated by: Communist Party	Deputy of the State Duma (1994–present)	29 December 2003	15 January 2004
Nikolay Kharitonov (55) (campaign)	Kharitonov was the candidate of the Communist Party of the Russian Federation, despite not being a member of the party. A former KGB colonel, he was a member of the Agrarian Party of Russia, an ally of the Communist Party. He was put forward after Communist leader Gennady Zyuganov declined to stand for a third time.			

=== Withdrawn candidates ===
Candidate name and age	Political party	Political offices	Details	Date of withdrawal
Ivan Rybkin (57) (campaign)	Nominated by: Initiative group Backed by: Liberal Russia (pro-Berezovsky wing)	Secretary of the Security Council (1996–1998); Chairman of the State Duma (1994–1996)	Rybkin was former chairman of the State Duma, the lower house of the Russian parliament, was nominated as a presidential candidate on 29 December 2003. On 7 February 2004, he was registered as a presidential candidate, but after his scandalous disappearance and his appearance in Kyiv in February 2004, he withdrew on 6 March.	6 March 2004

== Rejected nominations ==
- Anzori Iosifovich Aksentiev-Kikalishvilli, Chairman of the All-Russian Party of People.
- Viktor Gerashchenko (campaign), Deputy of the State Duma (Rodina), former chairman of the State Bank of the USSR and Central Bank of Russia.
- Igor Alexandrovich Smykov, chairman of the movement "For Social Justice", entrepreneur, human rights activist.
- German Sterligov (campaign), former owner of the exchange "Alisa", 2003 Moscow mayoral candidate

== Eliminated at the convention ==
=== Communist Party ===
- Gennady Semigin, Deputy Chairman of the State Duma (2000–2003), Chairman of the Executive Committee of the People's Patriotic Union of Russia.

9th Congress of the CPRF
Candidate	Votes
Nikolay Kharitonov	123
Gennady Semigin	105
None of the above	3
Viktor Ilyukhin	Withdrew
Nikolai Kondratenko	Withdrew
Svetlana Savitskaya	Withdrew

=== Liberal Democratic Party ===
- Sergey Abeltsev, Deputy of the State Duma (1994–2000, 2003–2011).
- Aleksandr Kurdyumov, Deputy of the State Duma (2003–2008, 2011–2021), 1998 Nizhny Novgorod mayoral candidate.
- Alexey Chernyshov, Deputy of the State Duma (2003–2007).

15th Congress of the LDPR
Candidate	Round 1	Round 2
Oleg Malyshkin	42	66
Sergey Abeltsev	36	?
Alexey Chernyshov	?	Eliminated
Aleksandr Kurdyumov	?	Eliminated

== Declared candidates who withdrew without registering ==
- Viktor Anpilov, leader of Labour Russia.
- Vladimir Bryntsalov (campaign), Deputy of the State Duma, 1996 presidential candidate.
- Vladimir Zhirinovsky, Deputy Chairman of the State Duma (2000–2011), 1991, 1996 and 2000 Liberal Democratic presidential candidate.

== Possible candidates who did not run ==
The following individuals were included in some polls, were referred to in the media as possible candidates or had publicly expressed interest long before the elections but never announced that they would run.

- Dmitry Ayatskov
- Alexander Barkashov
- Boris Berezovsky
- Viktor Chernomyrdin
- Anatoly Chubais
- Sergey Dorenko
- Umar Dzhabrailov
- Boris Fyodorov
- Yegor Gaidar
- Stanislav Govorukhin
- German Gref
- Boris Gryzlov
- Vladimir Gusinsky
- Viktor Ilyukhin
- Igor Ivanov
- Sergey Ivanov
- Mikhail Kasyanov
- Nikolay Kondratenko
- Sergey Kiriyenko
- Alexei Kudrin
- Mikhail Lapshin
- Alexander Lebed (died 28 April 2002)
- Alexander Lukashenko
- Yury Luzhkov
- Valentina Matviyenko
- Boris Nemtsov
- Ella Pamfilova
- Alexey Podberezkin
- Nikolay Patrushev
- Yevgeny Primakov
- Dmitry Rogozin
- Vladimir Rushailo
- Vladimir Ryzhkov
- Svetlana Savitskaya
- Yevgeny Savostyanov
- Gennadiy Seleznyov
- Vladimir Shamanov
- Lyubov Sliska
- Yegor Stroyev
- Sergey Shoygu
- Yury Skuratov
- Sergei Stepashin
- Konstantin Titov
- Aman Tuleyev
- Alexander Voloshin
- Gennady Zyuganov
- Grigory Yavlinsky
- Boris Yeltsin
