= Vladimir Putin presidential campaign =

Vladimir Putin presidential campaign may refer to:

- Vladimir Putin 2000 presidential campaign (independent)
- Vladimir Putin 2004 presidential campaign (independent)
- Vladimir Putin 2012 presidential campaign (United Russia)
- Vladimir Putin 2018 presidential campaign (independent)
- Vladimir Putin 2024 presidential campaign (independent)
