= Opinion polling for the 2004 Russian presidential election =

Opinion polling for the Russian presidential election, 2004

This is a collection of scientific, public opinion polls that have been conducted relating to the 2004 Russian presidential election.

== 2000 polls ==
Date	Agency	Putin	Khakamada	Zyuganov	Yavlinsky	Zhirinovsky	Lebed	Luzhkov	Nemtsov	Primakov	Kiriyenko	Tuleyev	Shoygu	Govorukhin	Kasyanov	Pamfilova	Podberezkin	Dzhabrailov	Seleznyov	Skuratov	Titov	Against All	Other	Undecided	Wouldn't vote	Additional candidates
26 Mar	2000 Result	53.4	—N/a	29.5	5.9	2.7	—N/a	—N/a	—N/a	—N/a	—N/a	3.0	—N/a	0.4	—N/a	1.0	0.1	0.1	—N/a	0.4	1.5	1.9	—N/a	—N/a	—N/a	—N/a
1–2 Apr	FOM	45	—N/a	22	5	4	—N/a	—N/a	—N/a	—N/a	—N/a	3	—N/a	—N/a	—N/a	1	—N/a	—N/a	—N/a	—N/a	1	3	1	5	10	—N/a
8–9 Apr	FOM	46	—N/a	22	5	3	—N/a	—N/a	—N/a	—N/a	—N/a	3	—N/a	—N/a	—N/a	1	—N/a	—N/a	—N/a	—N/a	1	4	1	8	7	—N/a
11 Apr	FOM	46	—N/a	22	5	3	—N/a	—N/a	—N/a	—N/a	—N/a	3	—N/a	0	—N/a	1	0	0	—N/a	0	1	4	—N/a	8	7	—N/a
15–16 Apr	FOM	47	—N/a	19	3	3	—N/a	—N/a	—N/a	—N/a	—N/a	3	—N/a	—N/a	—N/a	1	—N/a	—N/a	—N/a	—N/a	1	5	1	8	9	—N/a
18 Apr	FOM	47	—N/a	19	3	3	—N/a	—N/a	—N/a	—N/a	—N/a	3	—N/a	0	—N/a	1	0	0	—N/a	0	1	5	—N/a	8	9	—N/a
22–23 Apr	FOM	43	—N/a	17	3	3	—N/a	1	—N/a	5	1	3	0	—N/a	0	—N/a	—N/a	—N/a	—N/a	—N/a	—N/a	4	—N/a	6	10	—N/a
26 Apr	FOM	43	—N/a	17	3	3	3	1	0	5	1	3	—N/a	—N/a	—N/a	—N/a	—N/a	—N/a	0	—N/a	—N/a	4	—N/a	6	10	Stepashin 0
29–30 Apr	FOM	47	—N/a	15	4	3	—N/a	3	—N/a	3	1	4	1	—N/a	0	—N/a	—N/a	—N/a	—N/a	—N/a	—N/a	5	—N/a	7	6	—N/a
3 May	FOM	47	—N/a	15	4	3	—N/a	3	0	3	1	4	1	—N/a	—N/a	—N/a	—N/a	—N/a	—N/a	—N/a	—N/a	5	—N/a	7	6	Stepashin 0
6–7 May	FOM	51	—N/a	17	4	3	—N/a	3	—N/a	2	1	4	1	—N/a	0	—N/a	—N/a	—N/a	—N/a	—N/a	—N/a	3	—N/a	5	7	—N/a
7 May	First presidential inaugation of Vladimir Putin																									
10 May	FOM	51	—N/a	17	4	3	—N/a	3	0	2	1	4	1	—N/a	—N/a	—N/a	—N/a	—N/a	—N/a	—N/a	—N/a	3	—N/a	5	7	Stepashin 0
13–14 May	FOM	50	—N/a	18	5	3	—N/a	3	—N/a	2	1	4	1	—N/a	0	—N/a	—N/a	—N/a	—N/a	—N/a	—N/a	2	—N/a	6	6	—N/a
20–21 May	FOM	50	—N/a	16	4	2	—N/a	2	—N/a	2	1	3	1	—N/a	0	—N/a	—N/a	—N/a	—N/a	—N/a	—N/a	3	—N/a	6	7	—N/a
27–28 May	FOM	48	—N/a	16	5	3	—N/a	1	—N/a	2	2	5	1	—N/a	1	—N/a	—N/a	—N/a	—N/a	—N/a	—N/a	3	—N/a	6	7	—N/a
3–4 Jun	FOM	50	—N/a	17	3	3	—N/a	1	—N/a	2	2	3	1	—N/a	1	—N/a	—N/a	—N/a	—N/a	—N/a	—N/a	3	—N/a	6	8	—N/a
10–11 Jun	FOM	46	—N/a	16	4	4	—N/a	1	—N/a	2	3	4	1	—N/a	1	—N/a	—N/a	—N/a	4	—N/a	—N/a	—N/a	—N/a	7	7	—N/a
17–18 Jun	FOM	47	—N/a	16	4	4	—N/a	1	—N/a	3	2	3	1	—N/a	1	—N/a	—N/a	—N/a	—N/a	—N/a	—N/a	3	—N/a	7	9	—N/a
24–25 Jun	FOM	45	—N/a	17	5	4	—N/a	1	—N/a	3	2	3	2	—N/a	0	—N/a	—N/a	—N/a	—N/a	—N/a	—N/a	5	—N/a	7	8	—N/a
30 Jun−27 Jul	VCIOM	50	—N/a	13	3	3	1	0	—N/a	6	1	—N/a	—N/a	—N/a	—N/a	—N/a	—N/a	—N/a	—N/a	—N/a	—N/a	5	3	11	6	Stepashin 0
1–2 Jul	FOM	46	—N/a	15	3	4	—N/a	2	—N/a	2	2	5	2	—N/a	1	—N/a	—N/a	—N/a	—N/a	—N/a	—N/a	4	—N/a	8	7	—N/a
8–9 Jul	FOM	43	—N/a	15	4	5	—N/a	1	—N/a	4	2	4	1	—N/a	1	—N/a	—N/a	—N/a	—N/a	—N/a	—N/a	5	—N/a	8	7	—N/a
15 Jul	VCIOM	46	—N/a	19	5	3	—N/a	—N/a	—N/a	—N/a	—N/a	4	—N/a	1	—N/a	—N/a	0	0	—N/a	—N/a	—N/a	3	—N/a	12	4	—N/a
15–16 Jul	FOM	44	—N/a	18	4	4	—N/a	1	—N/a	2	3	4	1	—N/a	0	—N/a	—N/a	—N/a	—N/a	—N/a	—N/a	4	—N/a	7	8	—N/a
20−27 Jul	VCIOM	40	—N/a	19	2	2	0	1	—N/a	2	1	—N/a	—N/a	—N/a	—N/a	—N/a	—N/a	—N/a	—N/a	—N/a	—N/a	—N/a	—N/a	8	13	I. Ivanov 0
22–23 Jul	FOM	47	—N/a	14	3	4	—N/a	1	—N/a	3	2	6	1	—N/a	1	—N/a	—N/a	—N/a	—N/a	—N/a	—N/a	5	—N/a	7	7	—N/a
29–30 Jul	FOM	47	—N/a	15	3	4	—N/a	1	—N/a	3	2	4	2	—N/a	1	—N/a	—N/a	—N/a	—N/a	—N/a	—N/a	4	—N/a	7	7	—N/a
5–6 Aug	FOM	46	—N/a	17	4	3	—N/a	2	—N/a	2	1	5	2	—N/a	0	—N/a	—N/a	—N/a	—N/a	—N/a	—N/a	5	—N/a	7	6	—N/a
12 Aug	Kursk submarine disaster																									
12–13 Aug	FOM	46	—N/a	15	3	4	—N/a	1	—N/a	2	1	4	1	—N/a	1	—N/a	—N/a	—N/a	—N/a	—N/a	—N/a	5	—N/a	9	7	—N/a
18−21 Aug	VCIOM	40	—N/a	13	2	2	0	2	—N/a	2	0	—N/a	—N/a	—N/a	—N/a	—N/a	—N/a	—N/a	—N/a	—N/a	—N/a	1	7	16	17	Yeltsin 0
19–20 Aug	FOM	43	—N/a	15	3	4	—N/a	2	—N/a	3	2	5	—N/a	—N/a	—N/a	—N/a	—N/a	—N/a	—N/a	—N/a	—N/a	—N/a	—N/a	—N/a	—N/a	—N/a
26–27 Aug	FOM	42	—N/a	16	3	3	—N/a	2	—N/a	3	1	6	—N/a	—N/a	—N/a	—N/a	—N/a	—N/a	—N/a	—N/a	—N/a	—N/a	—N/a	—N/a	—N/a	—N/a
27–28 Aug	Ostankino Tower fire																									
2–3 Sep	FOM	44	—N/a	15	4	4	—N/a	2	—N/a	3	3	4	2	1	—N/a	—N/a	—N/a	—N/a	—N/a	—N/a	—N/a	3	—N/a	7	8	—N/a
9–10 Sep	FOM	43	—N/a	15	4	4	—N/a	1	—N/a	2	2	4	2	1	—N/a	—N/a	—N/a	—N/a	—N/a	—N/a	—N/a	5	—N/a	9	9	—N/a
15 Sep	VCIOM	48	0	13	3	2	0	0	0	1	1	3	0	0	0	0	—N/a	—N/a	—N/a	0	1	12	0	0	—N/a	(Note: Barkashov, Fyodorov, Gaidar, Gusinsky, Lukashenko, Matviyenko, Stepashin Stroyev 0%.)
16–17 Sep	FOM	41	—N/a	15	4	5	—N/a	2	—N/a	3	2	4	3	1	—N/a	—N/a	—N/a	—N/a	—N/a	—N/a	—N/a	4	—N/a	7	8	—N/a
20−25 Sep	VCIOM	41	—N/a	14	3	2	0	1	—N/a	1	—N/a	—N/a	—N/a	—N/a	0	—N/a	—N/a	—N/a	—N/a	—N/a	—N/a	8	6	12	11	Stepashin 0
23–24 Sep	FOM	41	—N/a	16	4	4	—N/a	2	—N/a	2	3	4	2	2	—N/a	—N/a	—N/a	—N/a	—N/a	—N/a	—N/a	5	—N/a	10	9	—N/a
30 Sep	VCIOM	64	0	7	2	1	0	0	0	1	0	3	0	0	—N/a	0	—N/a	—N/a	0	—N/a	0	7	1	—N/a	10	(Note: Ayatskov, Chubais, Gaidar, Gusinsky, Lukashenko, Matviyenko, Stepashin Stroyev 0%.)
30 Sep–1 Oct	FOM	42	—N/a	15	4	4	—N/a	2	—N/a	3	3	4	1	1	—N/a	—N/a	—N/a	—N/a	—N/a	—N/a	—N/a	5	—N/a	7	9	—N/a
7–8 Oct	FOM	42	—N/a	17	4	4	—N/a	2	—N/a	3	2	3	1	1	—N/a	—N/a	—N/a	—N/a	—N/a	—N/a	—N/a	5	—N/a	10	8	—N/a
10 Oct	VCIOM	52	0	11	2	1	0	1	0	2	0	3	0	0	0	0	—N/a	—N/a	0	0	0	8	1	—N/a	15	(Note: Ayatskov, Barkashov, Berezovsky, Gaidar, Gusinsky, Lukashenko, Matviyenko, Rushailo, Ryzhkov, Savostyanov, Sliska, Stepashin 0%.)
14–15 Oct	FOM	42	—N/a	17	4	4	—N/a	1	—N/a	3	2	4	2	1	—N/a	—N/a	—N/a	—N/a	—N/a	—N/a	—N/a	5	—N/a	8	8	—N/a
21–22 Oct	FOM	39	—N/a	18	4	5	—N/a	2	—N/a	2	2	3	2	0	—N/a	—N/a	—N/a	—N/a	—N/a	—N/a	—N/a	5	—N/a	10	9	—N/a
27−30 Oct	VCIOM	41	—N/a	14	2	3	—N/a	—N/a	—N/a	1	—N/a	—N/a	—N/a	—N/a	—N/a	—N/a	—N/a	1	—N/a	—N/a	—N/a	8	6	15	10	—N/a
28–29 Oct	FOM	44	—N/a	16	4	3	—N/a	2	—N/a	3	2	4	2	1	—N/a	—N/a	—N/a	—N/a	—N/a	—N/a	—N/a	5	—N/a	7	8	—N/a
4–5 Nov	FOM	43	—N/a	15	3	3	—N/a	2	—N/a	3	2	4	2	1	—N/a	—N/a	—N/a	—N/a	—N/a	—N/a	—N/a	6	—N/a	9	9	—N/a
11–12 Nov	FOM	45	—N/a	15	3	4	—N/a	2	—N/a	2	2	4	2	1	—N/a	—N/a	—N/a	—N/a	—N/a	—N/a	—N/a	4	—N/a	7	8	—N/a
15 Nov	VCIOM	54	0	12	3	3	0	1	0	2	1	2	0	0	0	0	—N/a	—N/a	0	0	—N/a	7	0	—N/a	10	(Note: Barkashov, Rushailo 1%, Ayatskov, Berezovsky, Gaidar, Gusinsky, Lukashenko, Matviyenko, Savostyanov, Stepashin 0%.)
18–19 Nov	FOM	41	—N/a	14	3	5	—N/a	2	—N/a	2	3	4	1	1	—N/a	—N/a	—N/a	—N/a	—N/a	—N/a	—N/a	4	—N/a	10	10	—N/a
25–26 Nov	FOM	47	—N/a	15	4	4	—N/a	2	—N/a	2	2	3	2	1	—N/a	—N/a	—N/a	—N/a	—N/a	—N/a	—N/a	5	—N/a	6	8	—N/a
30 Nov	VCIOM	56	0	13	3	2	—N/a	1	0	1	0	2	1	—N/a	1	1	—N/a	—N/a	0	—N/a	—N/a	7	1	—N/a	10	(Note: Ayatskov, Chernomyrdin, Gaidar, I. Ivanov, Rutskoy, Stroyev 0%.)
2–3 Dec	FOM	44	—N/a	15	3	4	—N/a	1	—N/a	2	1	5	2	2	—N/a	—N/a	—N/a	—N/a	—N/a	—N/a	—N/a	4	—N/a	10	7	—N/a
9–10 Dec	FOM	46	—N/a	16	3	4	—N/a	2	—N/a	3	2	4	3	1	—N/a	—N/a	—N/a	—N/a	—N/a	—N/a	—N/a	3	—N/a	7	9	—N/a
16–17 Dec	FOM	45	—N/a	17	3	3	—N/a	1	—N/a	2	1	3	2	1	—N/a	—N/a	—N/a	—N/a	—N/a	—N/a	—N/a	5	—N/a	8	9	—N/a
23–24 Dec	FOM	47	—N/a	15	4	3	—N/a	2	—N/a	2	2	3	3	1	—N/a	—N/a	—N/a	—N/a	—N/a	—N/a	—N/a	5	—N/a	8	9	—N/a

== 2001 polls ==
Date	Agency	Putin	Khaka- mada	Zyuganov	Yavlinsky	Zhiri- novsky	Lebed	Luzhkov	Nemtsov	Primakov	Kiriyenko	Tuleyev	Shoygu	Kasyanov	Against All	Other	Undecided	Wouldn't vote	Additional candidates
13–14 Jan	FOM	48	—N/a	16	2	3	—N/a	2	—N/a	2	1	3	3	1	4	—N/a	8	7	—N/a
18-22 Jan	VCIOM	47	—N/a	1	2	3	1	1	—N/a	1	0	—N/a	—N/a	0	7	7	10	10	Chernomyrdin; 0
20–21 Jan	FOM	48	—N/a	14	3	4	—N/a	1	—N/a	2	1	4	2	1	5	—N/a	7	8	—N/a
27–28 Jan	FOM	46	—N/a	15	3	4	—N/a	1	—N/a	3	1	5	3	1	5	—N/a	7	8	—N/a
3–4 Feb	FOM	47	—N/a	14	2	4	—N/a	1	—N/a	2	1	4	2	1	4	—N/a	8	9	—N/a
10–11 Feb	FOM	44	—N/a	15	3	4	—N/a	2	—N/a	2	1	4	5	1	5	—N/a	7	8	—N/a
17–18 Feb	FOM	45	—N/a	14	3	5	—N/a	1	—N/a	2	1	3	2	1	4	—N/a	8	11	—N/a
23-26 Feb	VCIOM	40	—N/a	13	2	3	0	1	—N/a	2	0	—N/a	—N/a	1	7	9	13	10	Stepashin; 0
24–25 Feb	FOM	44	—N/a	15	3	5	—N/a	2	—N/a	2	2	4	4	1	4	—N/a	9	7	—N/a
3–4 Mar	FOM	47	—N/a	13	4	4	—N/a	1	—N/a	2	1	4	2	1	4	—N/a	8	9	—N/a
10–11 Mar	FOM	45	—N/a	17	3	5	—N/a	2	—N/a	3	2	3	3	1	5	—N/a	6	6	—N/a
10–11 Mar	FOM	45	—N/a	17	3	5	—N/a	2	—N/a	3	2	3	3	1	5	—N/a	6	6	—N/a
17–18 Mar	FOM	45	—N/a	15	2	4	—N/a	2	—N/a	3	1	3	2	1	4	—N/a	8	10	—N/a
15 Mar	VCIOM	63	0	8	1	2	0	1	0	1	0	2	1	—N/a	6	1	—N/a	8	(Note: Matvienko 2%, Dorenko 1%, Ayatskov, Berezovsky, Chubais, Dorenko, Gaidar, Gref, I. Ivanov, Lukashenko, Pamfilova, Rushailo, Seleznyov, Stepashin, Voloshin 0%.)
24–25 Mar	FOM	46	—N/a	16	3	5	—N/a	2	—N/a	3	1	5	2	1	4	—N/a	7	6	—N/a
31 Mar–1 Apr	FOM	48	—N/a	15	3	4	—N/a	1	—N/a	2	1	4	2	1	5	—N/a	7	8	—N/a
3–14 Apr	Hostile takeover of the NTV television network by government-ovned Gazprom company																		
7–8 Apr	FOM	42	—N/a	17	5	4	—N/a	2	—N/a	3	2	4	3	1	5	—N/a	6	8	—N/a
14–15 Apr	FOM	42	—N/a	16	3	5	—N/a	2	1	2	—N/a	5	3	1	5	—N/a	6	10	—N/a
15 Apr	VCIOM	57	0	10	3	2	0	0	0	1	0	2	1	0	6	1	—N/a	12	(Note: Ayatskov, Berezovsky, Chernomyrdin, Gaidar, Gref, I. Ivanov, Lukashenko, Matvienko, Pamfilova, Rushailo, Ryzhkov, Seleznyov, Sliska, Stepashin, Voloshin 0%.)
20-21 Apr	VCIOM	41	—N/a	15	3	2	—N/a	0	—N/a	1	—N/a	—N/a	—N/a	0	6	6	11	14	Stepashin; 1
21–22 Apr	FOM	44	—N/a	15	4	4	—N/a	2	—N/a	3	2	4	3	1	5	—N/a	7	8	—N/a
5–6 May	FOM	42	—N/a	16	3	4	—N/a	2	1	3	—N/a	4	2	1	5	—N/a	7	10	—N/a
12–13 May	FOM	46	—N/a	15	4	4	—N/a	2	1	3	—N/a	4	2	1	5	—N/a	6	7	—N/a
19–20 May	FOM	44	—N/a	15	3	5	—N/a	2	1	3	—N/a	5	2	1	5	—N/a	6	9	—N/a
26–27 May	FOM	44	—N/a	15	3	4	—N/a	1	—N/a	2	2	4	3	1	4	—N/a	8	10	—N/a
2–3 Jun	FOM	44	—N/a	15	3	3	—N/a	3	1	2	—N/a	5	3	1	5	—N/a	7	8	—N/a
9–10 Jun	FOM	43	—N/a	13	3	5	—N/a	3	2	2	—N/a	5	3	1	5	—N/a	7	9	—N/a
15 Jun	VCIOM	57	0	9	2	3	1	0	0	1	0	3	1	0	7	0	—N/a	11	(Note: Kudrin 1%, Berezovsky, Chubais Gaidar, Lukashenko, Matvienko, Seleznyov, Stepashin, and Voloshin 0%.)
16 Jun	Slovenia Summit 2001																		
16–17 Jun	FOM	46	—N/a	13	3	4	—N/a	2	1	2	—N/a	4	3	0	6	—N/a	7	10	—N/a
23–24 Jun	FOM	43	—N/a	16	3	4	—N/a	3	2	2	—N/a	4	3	1	5	—N/a	7	8	—N/a
30 Jun–1 Jul	FOM	46	—N/a	14	3	4	—N/a	2	1	2	—N/a	3	3	0	6	—N/a	7	8	—N/a
7–8 Jul	FOM	43	—N/a	15	3	4	—N/a	2	1	2	—N/a	4	3	1	6	—N/a	8	8	—N/a
14–15 Jul	FOM	44	—N/a	14	2	3	—N/a	2	1	2	—N/a	5	3	1	6	—N/a	9	8	—N/a
15 Jul	VCIOM	56	0	10	2	2	0	0	0	0	0	3	1	1	8	1	—N/a	13	(Note: Ayatskov, Berezovsky, Chubais, Dorenko, Gaidar, Gref, I. Ivanov, Lukashenko, Matvienko, Pamfilova, Rushailo, Ryzhkov, Sliska, and Voloshin 0%.)
21–22 Jul	FOM	45	—N/a	14	3	5	—N/a	2	1	4	—N/a	4	3	1	5	—N/a	7	6	—N/a
28–29 Jul	FOM	45	—N/a	14	2	4	—N/a	1	1	2	—N/a	3	3	1	4	—N/a	9	9	—N/a
4–5 Aug	FOM	45	—N/a	14	3	5	—N/a	2	1	2	—N/a	3	2	1	4	—N/a	8	9	—N/a
11–12 Aug	FOM	44	—N/a	14	2	4	—N/a	3	1	3	—N/a	4	4	1	3	—N/a	7	10	—N/a
18–19 Aug	FOM	42	—N/a	15	2	4	—N/a	2	1	2	—N/a	4	3	0	5	—N/a	8	10	—N/a
24-27 Aug	VCIOM	40	—N/a	12	2	2	1	2	—N/a	1	0	—N/a	—N/a	0	7	8	10	13	Yeltsin; 1
25–26 Aug	FOM	43	—N/a	14	3	4	—N/a	2	1	2	—N/a	4	3	1	6	—N/a	9	8	—N/a
1–2 Sep	FOM	47	—N/a	15	2	3	—N/a	2	1	2	—N/a	4	4	2	3	—N/a	8	11	—N/a
8–9 Sep	FOM	45	—N/a	16	2	4	—N/a	2	1	2	—N/a	4	4	0	5	—N/a	8	8	—N/a
15–16 Sep	FOM	46	—N/a	13	2	3	—N/a	2	1	3	—N/a	3	3	1	6	—N/a	10	8	—N/a
24-27 Sep	VCIOM	47	—N/a	11	1	3	—N/a	0	—N/a	1	0	—N/a	—N/a	0	6	3	10	7	—N/a
22–23 Sep	FOM	48	—N/a	14	2	3	—N/a	1	1	3	—N/a	3	3	0	4	—N/a	10	9	—N/a
29–30 Sep	FOM	49	—N/a	15	2	3	—N/a	1	1	2	—N/a	3	3	0	3	—N/a	10	9	—N/a
6–7 Oct	FOM	50	—N/a	14	1	4	—N/a	1	1	4	—N/a	4	3	0	3	—N/a	9	9	—N/a
13–14 Oct	FOM	49	—N/a	14	1	3	—N/a	2	0	3	—N/a	4	3	0	4	—N/a	8	8	—N/a
17 Oct	Putin announces Russian withdrawal from the naval base in Cam Ranh, Vietnam and electronic station in Lourdes, Cuba																		
20–21 Oct	FOM	51	—N/a	15	2	—N/a	0	4	1	4	—N/a	3	3	1	4	—N/a	6	9	—N/a
27–28 Oct	FOM	50	—N/a	13	1	3	—N/a	2	0	3	—N/a	4	3	1	5	—N/a	8	7	—N/a
3–4 Nov	FOM	50	—N/a	11	2	—N/a	1	5	2	2	—N/a	3	2	1	5	—N/a	8	8	—N/a
10–11 Nov	FOM	49	—N/a	13	2	3	—N/a	2	1	2	—N/a	2	2	1	6	—N/a	9	8	—N/a
15 Nov	VCIOM	68	0	7	1	2	0	1	0	2	0	2	1	0	4	0	—N/a	8	(Note: Ayatskov, Chernomyrdin, Chubais, Gaidar, Gref, Gusinsky, I.Ivanov, S. Ivanov, Kudrin, Lukashenko, Matviyenko, Pamfilova, Patrushev, Ryzhkov, Shamanov, Sliska, Stepashin, Voloshin, Yeltsin 0%.)
17–18 Nov	FOM	53	—N/a	12	1	4	—N/a	2	1	2	—N/a	3	2	1	3	—N/a	8	7	—N/a
24–25 Nov	FOM	51	—N/a	13	2	3	—N/a	1	1	1	—N/a	3	2	1	5	—N/a	8	9	—N/a
1 Dec	Two largest parties supportive of Vladimir Putin, Unity and OVR, merge into United Russia																		
1–2 Dec	FOM	52	—N/a	13	2	4	—N/a	2	1	2	—N/a	3	2	—N/a	3	—N/a	7	9	—N/a
8–9 Dec	FOM	49	—N/a	14	1	3	—N/a	2	1	1	—N/a	3	2	—N/a	5	—N/a	7	8	—N/a
15–16 Dec	FOM	54	—N/a	12	2	3	—N/a	1	1	2	—N/a	3	2	—N/a	5	—N/a	7	8	—N/a
22–23 Dec	FOM	50	—N/a	13	2	3	—N/a	2	1	2	—N/a	2	2	1	5	—N/a	7	8	—N/a

== 2002 polls ==
Date	Agency	Putin	Khaka- mada	Mironov	Zyuganov	Yavlinsky	Zhiri- novsky	Luzhkov	Nemtsov	Primakov	Kiriyenko	Tuleyev	Shoygu	Kasyanov	Pamfilova	Against All	Other	Undecided	Wouldn't vote	Additional candidates
12–13 Jan	FOM	55	—N/a	—N/a	12	2	4	1	1	2	—N/a	3	2	1	—N/a	5	—N/a	6	7	—N/a
15 Jan	VCIOM	69	1	—N/a	7	1	3	0	0	1	—N/a	1	1	0	—N/a	6	0	—N/a	8	(Note: I. Ivanov, Lukashenko 1%, Gaidar, Gref, Lebed, Kudrin, Rushailo, Seleznyov, Shamanov, Voloshin 0%.)
19–20 Jan	FOM	51	—N/a	—N/a	14	2	4	1	0	2	—N/a	3	3	0	—N/a	3	—N/a	6	10	—N/a
25-28 Jan	VCIOM	51	—N/a	—N/a	11	2	4	0	—N/a	1	—N/a	—N/a	—N/a	0	—N/a	6	5	12	9	Lebed; 0
26–27 Jan	FOM	53	—N/a	—N/a	15	2	3	1	1	2	—N/a	2	2	1	—N/a	4	—N/a	5	9	—N/a
2–3 Feb	FOM	52	—N/a	—N/a	15	3	4	1	2	2	—N/a	2	1	2	—N/a	4	—N/a	6	7	—N/a
9–10 Feb	FOM	51	—N/a	—N/a	14	2	4	1	2	2	—N/a	4	1	3	—N/a	4	—N/a	7	8	—N/a
15 Feb	VCIOM	59	0	—N/a	8	1	3	1	0	1	0	1	1	0	0	7	0	—N/a	12	(Note: Ayatskov, Lapshin, Lebed, Lukashenko 1%, Chernomyrdin, Gaidar, Gref, I. Ivanov, Lebed, Kudrin, Seleznyov, Voloshin, Yeltsin 0%.)
16–17 Feb	FOM	50	—N/a	—N/a	13	1	4	2	2	3	—N/a	2	1	1	—N/a	5	—N/a	9	8	—N/a
23–24 Feb	FOM	52	—N/a	—N/a	12	2	5	1	2	2	—N/a	3	2	1	—N/a	4	—N/a	7	8	—N/a
2–3 Mar	FOM	51	—N/a	—N/a	13	2	4	1	2	1	—N/a	3	2	0	—N/a	4	—N/a	8	8	—N/a
9–10 Mar	FOM	51	—N/a	—N/a	13	2	4	1	2	2	—N/a	3	2	1	—N/a	4	—N/a	8	9	—N/a
15 Mar	VCIOM	65	—N/a	—N/a	8	1	2	0	—N/a	0	1	0	1	0	0	6	0	—N/a	12	(Note: Ayatskov, Matviyenko 1%, Chernomyrdin, Gaidar, Gref, Gusinsky, Lapshin, Lebed, Lukashenko, Seleznyov, Stepashin, Voloshin 0%.)
16–17 Mar	FOM	48	—N/a	—N/a	14	1	5	1	2	2	—N/a	3	2	1	—N/a	5	—N/a	8	9	—N/a
23–24 Mar	FOM	50	—N/a	—N/a	14	2	5	1	2	1	—N/a	2	2	1	—N/a	6	—N/a	7	8	—N/a
30–31 Mar	FOM	48	—N/a	—N/a	14	2	5	1	2	2	—N/a	3	1	1	—N/a	5	—N/a	7	10	—N/a
6–7 Apr	FOM	49	—N/a	—N/a	14	1	4	1	1	2	—N/a	3	2	1	—N/a	4	—N/a	9	9	—N/a
13–14 Apr	FOM	50	—N/a	—N/a	17	2	3	1	2	2	—N/a	3	2	1	—N/a	3	—N/a	6	7	—N/a
15 Apr	VCIOM	66	0	—N/a	8	2	3	0	1	1	0	1	1	0	—N/a	5	0	—N/a	9	(Note: Ayatskov, Chubais, Gaidar, Gref, I. Ivanov, Lebed, Matviyenko, Seleznyov 0%.)
19-22 Apr	VCIOM	48	—N/a	—N/a	12	3	4	2	—N/a	1	0	—N/a	—N/a	0	—N/a	6	5	9	11	Yeltsin; 0
27–28 Apr	FOM	49	—N/a	—N/a	13	2	5	1	2	3	—N/a	3	1	3	—N/a	4	—N/a	8	8	—N/a
28 Apr	Alexander Lebed dies in helicopter crash																			
4–5 May	FOM	50	—N/a	—N/a	14	1	4	1	2	2	—N/a	4	1	2	—N/a	4	—N/a	8	7	—N/a
11–12 May	FOM	48	—N/a	—N/a	14	2	4	0	2	3	—N/a	4	0	1	—N/a	5	—N/a	8	8	—N/a
15 May	VCIOM	65	1	—N/a	7	4	0	0	0	1	0	2	1	0	0	5	0	—N/a	11	(Note: Ayatskov, Gaidar, Gref, Gusinsky, I. Ivanov, S. Ivanov, Lapshin, Lebed, Lukashenko, Ryzhkov, Seleznyov, Stepashin, Voloshin 0%.)
18–19 May	FOM	50	—N/a	—N/a	13	2	4	1	1	2	—N/a	4	1	2	—N/a	4	—N/a	8	7	—N/a
25–26 May	FOM	48	—N/a	—N/a	13	2	5	1	1	1	—N/a	4	1	3	—N/a	5	—N/a	8	9	—N/a
1–2 Jun	FOM	50	—N/a	—N/a	13	1	4	1	2	2	—N/a	4	2	1	—N/a	5	—N/a	7	8	—N/a
8–9 Jun	FOM	48	—N/a	—N/a	11	1	4	1	2	2	—N/a	5	0	3	—N/a	6	—N/a	8	11	—N/a
15–16 Jun	FOM	46	—N/a	—N/a	13	2	4	1	2	4	—N/a	5	2	1	—N/a	5	—N/a	6	8	—N/a
22–23 Jun	FOM	46	—N/a	—N/a	13	2	4	1	2	2	—N/a	4	0	3	—N/a	6	—N/a	9	9	—N/a
29–30 Jun	FOM	54	—N/a	—N/a	13	2	4	1	1	1	—N/a	3	3	1	—N/a	4	—N/a	7	7	—N/a
6–7 Jul	FOM	49	—N/a	—N/a	11	2	5	1	2	2	—N/a	4	1	3	—N/a	5	—N/a	6	9	—N/a
13–14 Jul	FOM	51	—N/a	—N/a	13	2	3	1	1	1	—N/a	3	3	1	—N/a	4	—N/a	8	9	—N/a
20–21 Jul	FOM	52	—N/a	—N/a	11	1	5	1	1	3	—N/a	3	3	0	—N/a	4	—N/a	8	8	—N/a
27–28 Jul	FOM	52	—N/a	—N/a	10	2	3	1	1	2	—N/a	3	3	1	—N/a	5	—N/a	9	8	—N/a
3–4 Aug	FOM	47	—N/a	—N/a	11	1	5	1	2	1	—N/a	5	1	2	—N/a	5	—N/a	9	10	—N/a
10–11 Aug	FOM	53	—N/a	—N/a	12	2	4	1	1	1	—N/a	4	0	2	—N/a	3	—N/a	7	8	—N/a
15 Aug	VCIOM	71	0	0	5	1	2	0	0	0	—N/a	1	1	0	0	6	0	—N/a	7	(Note: Lukashenko 1%, Ayatskov, Gref, I. Ivanov, S. Ivanov, Kudrin, Matviyenko, Ryzhkov, Seleznyov, Shamanov, Sliska, Voloshin 0%.)
17–18 Aug	FOM	49	—N/a	—N/a	13	2	6	1	1	2	—N/a	3	0	2	—N/a	4	—N/a	9	8	—N/a
24–25 Aug	FOM	51	—N/a	—N/a	11	2	4	1	1	1	—N/a	4	1	3	—N/a	4	—N/a	8	8	—N/a
31 Aug–1 Sep	FOM	52	—N/a	—N/a	13	1	4	1	1	2	—N/a	3	1	2	—N/a	5	—N/a	9	8	—N/a
7–8 Sep	FOM	51	—N/a	—N/a	14	1	5	1	2	1	—N/a	3	0	3	—N/a	3	—N/a	7	8	—N/a
14–15 Sep	FOM	51	—N/a	—N/a	12	2	5	1	1	2	—N/a	2	0	3	—N/a	5	—N/a	8	7	—N/a
15 Sep	VCIOM	71	0	—N/a	6	1	2	0	1	1	—N/a	1	1	0	0	5	0	—N/a	9	(Note: Ayatskov 1%, Chubais, Gref, I. Ivanov, Lukashenko, Matviyenko, Ryzhkov, Seleznyov, Stepashin, Voloshin 0%.)
21–22 Sep	FOM	52	—N/a	—N/a	12	2	5	1	1	2	—N/a	1	3	2	—N/a	5	—N/a	7	7	—N/a
28–29 Sep	FOM	47	—N/a	—N/a	13	2	5	1	2	1	—N/a	4	1	3	—N/a	4	—N/a	9	7	—N/a
5–6 Oct	FOM	50	—N/a	—N/a	13	2	5	1	1	1	—N/a	4	1	4	—N/a	5	—N/a	7	7	—N/a
12–13 Oct	FOM	53	—N/a	—N/a	13	2	4	1	1	2	—N/a	3	2	1	—N/a	3	—N/a	7	7	—N/a
15 Oct	VCIOM	71	0	0	6	1	1	0	0	0	—N/a	1	1	1	0	5	1	—N/a	8	(Note: Ayatskov 1%, Chernomyrdin, Chubais, Gref, I. Ivanov, Lukashenko, Matviyenko, Nadezhdin, Pokhmelkin, Rushailo, Ryzhkov, Seleznyov, Stepashin, Voloshin, Yeltsin, Yushenkov 0%.)
19–20 Oct	FOM	51	—N/a	—N/a	14	2	5	1	1	2	—N/a	3	2	1	—N/a	4	—N/a	9	6	—N/a
23–26 Oct	Moscow theater hostage crisis																			
26–27 Oct	FOM	52	—N/a	—N/a	14	2	6	1	2	2	—N/a	2	2	1	—N/a	3	—N/a	6	7	—N/a
2–3 Nov	FOM	54	—N/a	—N/a	13	2	6	1	2	1	—N/a	2	2	0	—N/a	3	—N/a	8	6	—N/a
9–10 Nov	FOM	52	—N/a	—N/a	14	1	5	1	2	1	—N/a	3	1	1	—N/a	3	—N/a	9	6	—N/a
16–17 Nov	FOM	51	—N/a	—N/a	16	2	4	1	2	1	—N/a	3	2	1	—N/a	5	—N/a	7	6	—N/a
23–24 Nov	FOM	51	—N/a	—N/a	14	2	6	1	2	1	—N/a	2	2	0	—N/a	5	—N/a	8	7	—N/a
30 Nov–1 Dec	FOM	56	—N/a	—N/a	12	1	4	0	1	1	—N/a	3	2	1	—N/a	3	—N/a	7	8	—N/a
7–8 Dec	FOM	53	—N/a	—N/a	13	2	5	1	2	1	—N/a	2	2	1	—N/a	3	—N/a	8	7	—N/a
14–15 Dec	FOM	52	—N/a	—N/a	16	3	5	1	2	1	—N/a	3	2	1	—N/a	3	—N/a	6	7	—N/a
21–22 Dec	FOM	52	—N/a	—N/a	13	2	7	0	1	1	—N/a	2	1	1	—N/a	3	—N/a	8	7	—N/a

== 2003 polls ==
Date	Agency	Putin	Glazyev	Khaka- mada	Gerash- chenko	Rybkin	Zyuganov	Yavlinsky	Zhiri- novsky	Nemtsov	Luzhkov	Primakov	Tuleyev	Shoygu	Kasyanov	Seleznyov	Rogozin	Gryzlov	Against All	Other	Undecided	Wouldn't vote
11–12 Jan	FOM	55	—N/a	—N/a	—N/a	—N/a	12	3	5	1	1	1	2	2	1	—N/a	—N/a	—N/a	3	—N/a	7	6
18–19 Jan	FOM	50	—N/a	—N/a	—N/a	—N/a	16	2	4	0	1	2	3	2	0	—N/a	—N/a	—N/a	4	—N/a	7	7
25–26 Jan	FOM	51	—N/a	—N/a	—N/a	—N/a	16	2	4	1	1	1	2	2	1	—N/a	—N/a	—N/a	3	—N/a	10	6
1–2 Feb	FOM	50	—N/a	—N/a	—N/a	—N/a	15	2	5	0	1	1	3	1	1	—N/a	—N/a	—N/a	3	—N/a	8	9
8–9 Feb	FOM	50	—N/a	—N/a	—N/a	—N/a	14	2	5	1	1	2	3	2	1	—N/a	—N/a	—N/a	4	—N/a	9	6
15–16 Feb	FOM	47	—N/a	—N/a	—N/a	—N/a	16	2	4	1	1	1	2	2	0	—N/a	—N/a	—N/a	—N/a	—N/a	—N/a	—N/a
22–23 Feb	FOM	49	—N/a	—N/a	—N/a	—N/a	13	2	5	0	1	2	3	2	1	—N/a	—N/a	—N/a	4	—N/a	10	7
1–2 Mar	FOM	48	—N/a	—N/a	—N/a	—N/a	15	2	5	0	1	1	2	2	0	—N/a	—N/a	—N/a	3	—N/a	10	8
8–9 Mar	FOM	49	—N/a	—N/a	—N/a	—N/a	16	2	5	1	2	1	2	2	0	—N/a	—N/a	—N/a	3	—N/a	10	7
15–16 Mar	FOM	50	—N/a	—N/a	—N/a	—N/a	15	3	4	0	1	2	3	3	0	—N/a	—N/a	—N/a	3	—N/a	9	6
22–23 Mar	FOM	51	—N/a	—N/a	—N/a	—N/a	15	2	4	1	1	2	2	1	1	—N/a	—N/a	—N/a	4	—N/a	9	7
29–30 Mar	FOM	51	—N/a	—N/a	—N/a	—N/a	14	2	5	1	1	2	3	1	0	—N/a	—N/a	—N/a	3	—N/a	11	6
5–6 Apr	FOM	50	—N/a	—N/a	—N/a	—N/a	15	3	4	1	1	2	4	1	1	—N/a	—N/a	—N/a	3	—N/a	9	7
12–13 Apr	FOM	50	—N/a	—N/a	—N/a	—N/a	14	2	5	1	1	2	3	2	0	—N/a	—N/a	—N/a	3	—N/a	10	7
17 Apr	Assassination of Sergei Yushenkov																					
19–20 Apr	FOM	49	—N/a	—N/a	—N/a	—N/a	15	2	5	1	1	1	4	2	0	—N/a	—N/a	—N/a	3	—N/a	8	7
26–27 Apr	FOM	48	—N/a	—N/a	—N/a	—N/a	15	2	4	1	1	1	2	2	0	—N/a	—N/a	—N/a	5	—N/a	11	7
10–11 May	FOM	49	—N/a	—N/a	—N/a	—N/a	15	2	5	1	1	2	3	2	0	—N/a	—N/a	—N/a	4	—N/a	10	6
17 May	FOM	50	—N/a	—N/a	—N/a	—N/a	13	2	5	1	1	2	3	2	—N/a	—N/a	—N/a	—N/a	—N/a	—N/a	—N/a	—N/a
17–18 May	FOM	50	—N/a	—N/a	—N/a	—N/a	13	2	5	1	1	1	3	2	0	—N/a	—N/a	—N/a	4	—N/a	11	8
24–25 May	FOM	48	—N/a	—N/a	—N/a	—N/a	15	2	5	1	1	2	3	1	0	—N/a	—N/a	—N/a	4	—N/a	12	7
31 May–1 Jun	FOM	50	—N/a	—N/a	—N/a	—N/a	14	2	5	1	1	2	3	1	0	—N/a	—N/a	—N/a	4	—N/a	10	6
7–8 Jun	FOM	49	—N/a	—N/a	—N/a	—N/a	14	2	5	1	1	1	2	2	0	—N/a	—N/a	—N/a	5	—N/a	10	7
14 Jun	FOM	50	—N/a	—N/a	—N/a	—N/a	12	2	6	1	1	2	3	1	0	—N/a	—N/a	—N/a	5	—N/a	10	7
14–15 Jun	FOM	48	—N/a	—N/a	—N/a	—N/a	14	2	4	1	1	1	3	2	1	—N/a	—N/a	—N/a	5	—N/a	11	7
21–22 Jun	FOM	50	—N/a	—N/a	—N/a	—N/a	14	2	5	1	1	1	2	2	0	—N/a	—N/a	—N/a	5	—N/a	10	7
28–29 Jun	FOM	48	—N/a	—N/a	—N/a	—N/a	14	2	5	1	1	2	2	2	0	—N/a	—N/a	—N/a	4	—N/a	10	7
5–6 Jul	FOM	48	—N/a	—N/a	—N/a	—N/a	14	2	5	1	1	2	3	2	1	—N/a	—N/a	—N/a	5	—N/a	10	7
12–13 Jul	FOM	51	—N/a	—N/a	—N/a	—N/a	13	2	5	1	1	1	3	2	0	—N/a	—N/a	—N/a	4	—N/a	9	8
19–20 Jul	FOM	49	—N/a	—N/a	—N/a	—N/a	13	2	5	1	1	2	3	2	0	—N/a	—N/a	—N/a	5	—N/a	10	7
26–27 Jul	FOM	49	—N/a	—N/a	—N/a	—N/a	14	2	5	1	1	1	2	1	0	—N/a	—N/a	—N/a	5	—N/a	10	8
2–3 Aug	FOM	50	—N/a	—N/a	—N/a	—N/a	12	2	5	1	1	1	2	2	0	—N/a	—N/a	—N/a	5	—N/a	11	7
9–10 Aug	FOM	50	—N/a	—N/a	—N/a	—N/a	12	2	6	1	1	2	3	1	0	—N/a	—N/a	—N/a	—N/a	—N/a	—N/a	—N/a
16–17 Aug	FOM	47	—N/a	—N/a	—N/a	—N/a	13	2	6	1	1	1	3	2	0	—N/a	—N/a	—N/a	4	—N/a	12	8
23–24 Aug	FOM	49	—N/a	—N/a	—N/a	—N/a	13	2	6	1	1	1	3	1	1	—N/a	—N/a	—N/a	4	—N/a	10	8
30–31 Aug	FOM	50	—N/a	—N/a	—N/a	—N/a	13	1	5	1	1	1	3	2	0	—N/a	—N/a	—N/a	5	—N/a	10	8
Sep	VCIOM	55	3	—N/a	—N/a	—N/a	11	2	3	2	—N/a	—N/a	5	—N/a	—N/a	—N/a	—N/a	—N/a	—N/a	9	—N/a	—N/a
Sep	ROMIR	61	1	—N/a	—N/a	—N/a	6	2	4	1	—N/a	—N/a	—N/a	—N/a	—N/a	—N/a	—N/a	—N/a	3	—N/a	5	—N/a
6–7 Sep	FOM	48	—N/a	—N/a	—N/a	—N/a	13	2	5	1	1	2	3	1	0	1	—N/a	1	4	—N/a	10	7
14–15 Sep	FOM	47	—N/a	—N/a	—N/a	—N/a	12	2	6	1	2	3	2	2	1	0	—N/a	1	4	—N/a	11	8
20–21 Sep	FOM	50	—N/a	—N/a	—N/a	—N/a	12	1	4	—N/a	2	2	2	2	0	1	—N/a	1	—N/a	—N/a	—N/a	—N/a
27–28 Sep	FOM	48	—N/a	—N/a	—N/a	—N/a	12	1	5	1	1	2	3	2	0	1	—N/a	1	5	—N/a	12	7
Sep–Oct	Russia-Ukraine territorial dispute over Tuzla island near Crimea																					
4–5 Oct	FOM	51	—N/a	—N/a	—N/a	—N/a	12	1	5	1	1	1	3	1	0	0	—N/a	1	5	—N/a	11	7
11–12 Oct	FOM	49	—N/a	—N/a	—N/a	—N/a	13	2	4	1	1	1	3	2	0	0	—N/a	1	4	—N/a	11	8
18–19 Oct	FOM	49	—N/a	—N/a	—N/a	—N/a	14	1	5	0	1	2	3	1	1	1	—N/a	1	4	—N/a	10	7
25–26 Oct	FOM	50	—N/a	—N/a	—N/a	—N/a	11	1	4	1	1	1	3	2	0	0	—N/a	1	5	—N/a	11	8
1–2 Nov	FOM	51	—N/a	—N/a	—N/a	—N/a	11	2	4	0	1	1	3	2	0	0	—N/a	1	4	—N/a	12	6
8–9 Nov	FOM	49	—N/a	—N/a	—N/a	—N/a	12	2	4	1	1	1	2	2	0	0	—N/a	1	4	—N/a	13	7
15–16 Nov	FOM	49	—N/a	—N/a	—N/a	—N/a	11	2	5	1	1	1	3	2	0	0	—N/a	1	5	—N/a	11	8
18 Nov–23 Dec	VCIOM	75	—N/a	1	—N/a	—N/a	4	1	7	—N/a	—N/a	—N/a	—N/a	—N/a	—N/a	—N/a	—N/a	—N/a	—N/a	11		—N/a
22–23 Nov	FOM	51	—N/a	—N/a	—N/a	—N/a	10	2	5	1	1	1	2	2	1	0	—N/a	1	4	—N/a	13	7
29–30 Nov	FOM	52	—N/a	—N/a	—N/a	—N/a	12	2	5	1	1	1	2	1	1	0	—N/a	1	4	—N/a	11	5
3–4 Dec	FOM	52	—N/a	—N/a	—N/a	—N/a	12	2	5	1	1	1	2	1	1	0	—N/a	1	—N/a	—N/a	—N/a	—N/a
7 Dec	2003 Russian legislative election																					
13–14 Dec	FOM	61	—N/a	—N/a	—N/a	—N/a	5	1	7	1	1	1	2	1	1	0	—N/a	1	4	—N/a	10	5
18 Dec	Vladimir Putin declares his candidacy																					
20-21 Dec	FOM	66	—N/a	—N/a	—N/a	—N/a	4	1	6	0	1	1	2	1	0	0	0	0	3	—N/a	8	6
23–28 Dec	FOM	65	2	0	1	0.5	4	1	5	0	1	1	1	1	0	0	0	0	3	—N/a	8	6
26 Dec	LDPR nominates Oleg Malyshkin for president																					

== 2004 polls ==
Date	Agency	Putin	Khari- tonov	Glazyev	Khaka- mada	Malyshkin	Mironov	Gerash- chenko	Rybkin	Zyuganov	Aksentyev- Kikalishvili	Bryntsalov	Sterligov	Against All	Other	Undecided	Wouldn't vote	No preference
9–13 Jan	FOM	71.0	1.5	3.4	1.2	0.2	0.3	1	0.5	0.2	0.0	0.3	0.0	3.8	—N/a	10.4	7.2	—N/a
9-13 Jan	VCIOM	71.3	1.2	3.5	1.0	—N/a	—N/a	—N/a	—N/a	—N/a	—N/a	—N/a	—N/a	3.9	4	8.8	6.7	19
10–11 Jan	FOM	71.0	1.5	3.4	1.2	0.2	0.3	—N/a	0.2	—N/a	—N/a	—N/a	—N/a	3.8	—N/a	10.4	7.2	—N/a
10–11 Jan	VCIOM	80	1	3	1	<1	<1	<1	<1	—N/a	1	1	—N/a	2	—N/a	6	—N/a	—N/a
15–20 Jan	ROMIR	78	1	3	1	1	1	—N/a	1	—N/a	—N/a	—N/a	—N/a	6	—N/a	—N/a	—N/a	—N/a
17–18 Jan	FOM	70.7	1.4	3.5	1.1	0.2	0.3	1	0.3	0.4	0.2	0.1	—N/a	3.8	—N/a	10.5	7.6	—N/a
23-26 Jan	VCIOM	67.0	1.7	3.7	1.49	—N/a	—N/a	—N/a	—N/a	—N/a	—N/a	—N/a	—N/a	6.3	4	6.3	6.3	19
23–27 Jan	VCIOM	79	2	4	1	<1	1	1	<1	—N/a	<1	<1	—N/a	4	—N/a	9	—N/a	—N/a
24–25 Jan	FOM	68.6	1.6	3.5	1.5	0.4	0.2	0.3	0.2	—N/a	0.1	0.3	—N/a	4	—N/a	11.9	7.2	—N/a
28 Jan	Last day of signature gathering for presidential candidates																	
31 Jan–1 Feb	FOM	70.8	2.3	3.7	1.4	0.5	0.4	0.4	0.3	—N/a	—N/a	0.3	—N/a	3.4	—N/a	10	6.9	—N/a
7–8 Feb	FOM	71.1	1.8	2.7	1.3	0.3	0.3	—N/a	0.1	—N/a	—N/a	—N/a	—N/a	2.5	—N/a	12.0	7.8	—N/a
13–16 Feb	VCIOM	80	5	4	2	1	1	1	1	—N/a	—N/a	—N/a	—N/a	4	—N/a	—N/a	—N/a	—N/a
13–16 Feb	VCIOM	68.6	3.9	3.8	1.4	—N/a	—N/a	—N/a	—N/a	—N/a	—N/a	—N/a	—N/a	6.0	—N/a	8.3	6.2	—N/a
14–15 Feb	FOM	69.9	3.3	2.2	2.1	0.6	0.4	—N/a	0.1	—N/a	—N/a	—N/a	—N/a	4.2	—N/a	10.8	6.4	—N/a
21–22 Feb	FOM	69.3	5.4	3.5	2.2	1.3	0.4	—N/a	0.1	—N/a	—N/a	—N/a	—N/a	2.8	—N/a	8.5	6.6	—N/a
24 Feb	Dismissal of prime minister Mikhail Kasyanov																	
28–29 Feb	FOM	64.8	6.1	2.8	2.9	1.5	0.6	—N/a	0.1	—N/a	—N/a	—N/a	—N/a	2.0	—N/a	11.5	7.7	—N/a
29 Feb	FOM	64.8	6.1	2.8	2.9	1.5	0.6	—N/a	0.1	—N/a	—N/a	—N/a	—N/a	2.0	—N/a	11.4	—N/a	—N/a
5 Mar	Ivan Rybkin withdraws his candidacy																	
5–8 Mar	Levada	73.7	10.3	4.7	3.2	2.3	1.1	—N/a	—N/a	—N/a	—N/a	—N/a	—N/a	4.6	—N/a	—N/a	—N/a	—N/a
5–8 Mar	VCIOM	61.9	7.9	4.0	3.2	—N/a	—N/a	—N/a	—N/a	—N/a	—N/a	—N/a	—N/a	5.1	3	8.4	7.9	21
6–7 Mar	FOM	62.5	6.8	2.9	2.9	1.9	0.6	—N/a	0.2	—N/a	—N/a	—N/a	—N/a	3.0	—N/a	11.8	7.1	—N/a
8 Mar	FOM	73	9	5	4	2	1	—N/a	—N/a	—N/a	—N/a	—N/a	—N/a	4	—N/a	—N/a	—N/a	—N/a
8 Mar	FOM	71.8	9.5	5.2	4.0	3.2	1.7	—N/a	—N/a	—N/a	—N/a	—N/a	—N/a	4.6	—N/a	—N/a	—N/a	—N/a
12 Mar	FOM	75	11	4	4	2	1	—N/a	—N/a	—N/a	—N/a	—N/a	—N/a	3	—N/a	—N/a	—N/a	—N/a
14 Mar	Election result	71.9	13.8	4.1	3.9	2.0	0.8	—N/a	—N/a	—N/a	—N/a	—N/a	—N/a	3.5	—N/a	—N/a	—N/a	—N/a

== Exit polls ==
Agency	Putin	Kharitonov	Glazyev	Khakamada	Malyshkin	Mironov	Against all
FOM	69.0%	12.6%	4.7%	4.7%	2.3%	1.0%	5.7%
Election result	71.9%	13.8%	4.1%	3.9%	2.0%	0.8%	3.5%

== Subnational polls ==
=== Central Federal District ===
Agency	Date	Putin	Zyuganov	Kiriyenko	Yavlinsky	Zhirinovsky	Primakov	Tuleyev	Shoygu	Luzhkov	Kasyanov	Against All	Undecided	Wouldn't vote
FOM	12–13 May 2001	44	14	7	5	4	3	3	2	1	0	5	6	6
FOM	19–20 May 2001	40	16	4	3	5	2	3	3	2	1	4	9	10
FOM	26–27 May 2001	42	14	7	5	5	3	3	2	1	0	3	9	7
FOM	2–3 June 2001	43	11	5	4	2	3	2	3	1	1	7	10	8
FOM	9–10 June 2001	38	11	6	4	4	4	4	3	4	0	5	8	9
FOM	16–17 June 2001	38	15	5	4	3	3	3	3	1	0	6	7	12
FOM	23–24 June 2001	43	13	6	3	3	4	2	4	1	1	5	9	6
FOM	30 June–1 July 2001	39	14	6	4	5	3	3	3	0	0	7	8	9
FOM	7–8 July 2001	40	13	4	3	4	4	4	3	1	1	4	8	12
FOM	14–15 July 2001	43	13	4	4	4	5	4	2	1	0	6	10	7
FOM	21–22 July 2001	42	10	5	5	6	6	2	2	1	1	5	9	5
FOM	28–29 July 2001	43	11	4	4	4	2	3	2	1	0	3	9	13
FOM	4–5 August 2001	39	13	6	4	5	3	2	2	1	0	6	10	10
FOM	11–12 August 2001	42	14	6	4	7	4	3	2	1	1	2	7	8
FOM	18–19 August 2001	40	12	5	2	3	3	2	3	1	0	6	11	11
FOM	25–26 August 2001	41	10	6	3	4	4	2	3	2	1	8	7	9
FOM	1–2 September 2001	41	13	6	3	3	3	4	2	2	1	4	12	8
FOM	8–9 September 2001	39	13	6	2	4	4	2	4	1	0	3	12	10
FOM	15–16 September 2001	45	12	4	3	3	4	2	1	1	0	5	12	7
FOM	22–23 September 2001	43	16	3	2	3	4	2	2	1	1	4	11	7
FOM	29–30 September 2001	51	9	2	3	3	5	1	2	1	0	4	11	9
FOM	6–7 October 2001	49	12	3	2	3	4	2	3	1	0	3	9	9
FOM	13–14 October 2001	48	9	7	2	4	3	3	4	0	1	5	7	9
FOM	20–21 October 2001	54	13	2	3	4	2	1	3	0	0	5	6	6
FOM	27–28 October 2001	47	14	5	1	3	4	1	1	0	0	4	10	10
FOM	3–4 November 2001	49	12	3	3	3	4	1	2	1	0	5	11	6
FOM	10–11 November 2001	45	12	4	2	3	4	1	2	1	1	8	12	6
FOM	17–18 November 2001	54	11	3	1	3	3	3	1	1	1	4	8	6
FOM	24–25 November 2001	45	12	2	2	2	3	1	2	2	0	7	8	12
FOM	1–2 December 2001	46	18	5	2	7	3	0	1	1	0	3	6	9
FOM	8–9 December 2001	49	11	5	3	2	2	1	2	1	0	7	7	9
FOM	15–16 December 2001	45	17	3	3	4	4	2	2	0	1	4	5	10
FOM	22–23 December 2001	48	12	4	1	3	3	1	1	1	1	4	8	12

==== Exit polls ====
Agency	Putin	Kharitonov	Glazyev	Khakamada	Malyshkin	Mironov	Against all
FOM	67.3%	8.0%	5.0%	5.7%	1.9%	0.6%	7.3%

=== Far Eastern Federal District ===
Date	Agency	Putin	Zyuganov	Yavlinsky	Zhirinovsky	Luzhkov	Nemtsov	Primakov	Kiriyenko	Shoygu	Tuleyev	Kasyanov	Against All	Undecided	Wouldn't vote	Additional candidates
2–3 September 2000	FOM	53%	11%	0%	2%	0%	—N/a	4%	0%	8%	13%	0%	2%	2%	0%	—N/a
9–10 September 2000	FOM	43%	16%	0%	7%	0%	—N/a	0%	2%	0%	1%	0%	6%	17%	9%	—N/a
16–17 September 2000	FOM															
23–24 September 2000	FOM															
30 September–1 October 2000	FOM															
7–8 October 2000	FOM															
14–15 October 2000	FOM															
21–22 October 2000	FOM															
28–28 October 2000	FOM															
4–5 November 2000	FOM															
11–12 November 2000	FOM															
18–19 November 2000	FOM															
25–26 November 2000	FOM															
2–3 December 2000	FOM															
9–10 December 2000	FOM															
16–17 December 2000	FOM															
23–24 December 2000	FOM															
13–14 January 2001	FOM															
20–21 January 2001	FOM															
12–13 May 2001	FOM															
19–20 May 2001	FOM															
26–27 May 2001	FOM															
2–3 June 2001	FOM															
9–10 June 2001	FOM															
16–17 June 2001	FOM															
23–24 June 2001	FOM															
30 June–July 1, 2001	FOM															
7–8 July 2001	FOM															
14–15 July 2001	FOM															
21–22 July 2001	FOM															
28–29 July 2001	FOM															
4–5 August 2001	FOM															
11–12 August 2001	FOM															
18–19 August 2001	FOM															
25–26 August 2001	FOM															
1–2 September 2001	FOM															
8–9 September 2001	FOM															
15–16 September 2001	FOM															
22–23 September 2001	FOM															
29–30 September 2001	FOM															
6–7 October 2001	FOM															
13–14 October 2001	FOM															
27–28 October 2001	FOM															
3–4 November 2001	FOM															
10–11 November 2001	FOM															
17–18 November 2001	FOM															
24–25 November 2001	FOM															
1–2 December 2001	FOM															
8–9 December 2001	FOM															
15–16 December 2001	FOM															
22–23 December 2001	FOM															

==== Exit polls ====
Agency	Putin	Kharitonov	Glazyev	Khakamada	Malyshkin	Mironov	Against all
FOM	59.4%	14.5%	7.7%	4.7%	5.1%	1.7%	6.9%

=== Moscow ===
Date	Agency	Putin	Zyuganov	Yavlinsky	Zhiri- novsky	Luzhkov	Nemtsov	Primakov	Kiri- yenko	Shoygu	Tuleyev	Kasyanov	Against All	Undecided	Wouldn't vote	Additional candidates
29 March 2000	FOM	39%	11%	13%	1%	—N/a	—N/a	—N/a	—N/a	—N/a	1%	—N/a	7%	13%	11%	Govorukhin, Pamfilova 2%, Skuratov, Titov 1%
3 April 2000	FOM	39%	11%	13%	1%	—N/a	—N/a	—N/a	—N/a	—N/a	1%	—N/a	7%	13%	11%	Govorukhin, Pamfilova 2%, Skuratov, Titov 1%, Dzhabrailov, Podberezkin 0%
10 April 2000	FOM	35%	13%	12%	1%	—N/a	—N/a	—N/a	—N/a	—N/a	1%	—N/a	10%	14%	12%	Govorukhin, Pamfilova, Skuratov, Titov 1%, Dzhabrailov, Podberezkin 0%
17 April 2000	FOM	37%	11%	10%	1%	—N/a	—N/a	—N/a	—N/a	—N/a	1%	—N/a	10%	17%	11%	Pamfilova, Titov 1%, Dzhabrailov, Govorukhin, Podberezkin, Skuratov 0%
26 April 2000	FOM	43%	13%	6%	5%	8%	0%	6%	0%	—N/a	3%	—N/a	7%	5%	7%	Lebed, Seleznyov, Stepashin 0%
4 May 2000	FOM	43%	12%	11%	3%	6%	1%	8%	1%	1%	2%	—N/a	4%	3%	4%	Stepashin 1%
10 May 2000	FOM	41%	10%	11%	2%	7%	1%	11%	2%	1%	2%	—N/a	4%	3%	5%	Stepashin 2%
2–3 September 2000	FOM	32%	9%	11%	3%	14%	—N/a	9%	2%	2%	2%	1%	7%	4%	4%	—N/a
9–10 September 2000	FOM	35%	9%	11%	3%	13%	—N/a	7%	1%	2%	2%	0%	6%	4%	6%	—N/a
16–17 September 2000	FOM	32%	9%	11%	1%	15%	—N/a	11%	3%	1%	2%	1%	5%	3%	6%	—N/a
23–24 September 2000	FOM	33%	9%	10%	2%	19%	—N/a	6%	2%	1%	2%	1%	5%	2%	8%	—N/a
30 September–1 October 2000	FOM	34%	11%	7%	2%	15%	—N/a	10%	2%	1%	2%	1%	6%	3%	6%	—N/a
7–8 October 2000	FOM	36%	7%	9%	3%	11%	—N/a	10%	2%	1%	2%	1%	8%	5%	6%	—N/a
14–15 October 2000	FOM	35%	10%	11%	3%	10%	—N/a	9%	3%	1%	2%	0%	5%	4%	8%	—N/a
21–22 October 2000	FOM	35%	10%	10%	3%	10%	—N/a	8%	3%	2%	1%	0%	5%	6%	7%	—N/a
28–29 October 2000	FOM	36%	10%	11%	1%	10%	—N/a	10%	2%	2%	1%	0%	6%	4%	8%	—N/a
4–5 November 2000	FOM	34%	10%	11%	1%	13%	—N/a	9%	3%	1%	2%	1%	6%	4%	7%	—N/a
11–12 November 2000	FOM	34%	8%	10%	2%	14%	—N/a	8%	3%	2%	2%	1%	6%	3%	6%	—N/a
18–19 November 2000	FOM	35%	10%	9%	2%	14%	—N/a	8%	2%	2%	1%	1%	5%	3%	9%	—N/a
25–26 November 2000	FOM	36%	10%	8%	2%	14%	—N/a	8%	3%	1%	2%	1%	5%	3%	7%	—N/a
2–3 December 2000	FOM	33%	9%	8%	3%	12%	—N/a	9%	2%	2%	2%	1%	6%	6%	7%	—N/a
9–10 December 2000	FOM	36%	8%	9%	1%	15%	—N/a	6%	3%	3%	1%	1%	6%	3%	8%	—N/a
16–17 December 2000	FOM	36%	9%	10%	1%	10%	—N/a	8%	1%	2%	2%	1%	8%	4%	9%	—N/a
23–24 December 2000	FOM	34%	9%	10%	2%	12%	—N/a	8%	1%	1%	2%	1%	5%	4%	10%	—N/a
13–14 January 2001	FOM	37%	10%	7%	2%	13%	—N/a	6%	3%	2%	2%	0%	6%	4%	9%	—N/a
20–21 January 2001	FOM	35%	11%	8%	4%	10%	—N/a	8%	2%	4%	2%	1%	8%	3%	5%	—N/a
May 2001	FOM															
June 2001	FOM															
July 2001	FOM															
August 2001	FOM															
1–2 September 2001	FOM															
8–9 September 2001	FOM															
15–16 September 2001	FOM															
22–23 September 2001	FOM															
6–7 October 2001	FOM															
20–21 October 2001	FOM															
28–28 October 2001	FOM															
3–4 November 2001	FOM															
10–11 November 2001	FOM															
17–18 November 2001	FOM															
24–25 November 2001	FOM															
1–2 December 2001	FOM															
8–9 December 2001	FOM															
15–16 December 2001	FOM															
22–23 December 2001	FOM															
12–13 January 2002	FOM															
19–20 January 2002	FOM															
26–27 January 2002	FOM															
2–3 February 2002	FOM															
9–10 February 2002	FOM															
16–17 February 2002	FOM															
23–24 February 2002	FOM															
2–3 March 2002	FOM															
9–10 March 2002	FOM															
16–17 March 2002	FOM															
23–24 March 2002	FOM															
30–31 March 2002	FOM															
6–7 April 2002	FOM															
13–14 April 2002	FOM															
20–21 April 2002	FOM															
27–28 April 2002	FOM															
4–5 May 2002	FOM															
11–12 May 2002	FOM															
18–19 May 2002	FOM															
25–26 May 2002	FOM															
1–2 June 2002	FOM															
8–9 June 2002	FOM															
15–16 June 2002	FOM															
22–23 June 2002	FOM															
29–30 June 2002	FOM															
6–7 July 2002	FOM															
13–14 July 2002	FOM															
20–21 July 2002	FOM															
27–28 July 2002	FOM															
3–4 August 2002	FOM															
10–11 August 2002	FOM															
17–18 August 2002	FOM															
24–25 August 2002	FOM															
31 August–1 September 2002	FOM															
7–8 September 2002	FOM															
14–15 September 2002	FOM															
21–22 September 2002	FOM															
28–29 September 2002	FOM															
5–6 October 2002	FOM															
12–13 October 2002	FOM															
19–20 October 2002	FOM															
26–27 October 2002	FOM															
2–3 November 2002	FOM															
9–10 November 2002	FOM															
16–17 November 2002	FOM															
23–24 November 2002	FOM															
30 November–1 December 2002	FOM															
7–8 December 2002	FOM															
14–15 December 2002	FOM															
21–22 December 2002	FOM															
28–29 December 2002	FOM	46%	10%	8%	3%	5%	4%	8%	—N/a	2%	0%	0%	—N/a	—N/a	—N/a	—N/a
11–12 January 2003	FOM	47%	8%	8%	2%	8%	1%	5%	—N/a	3%	3%	1%	—N/a	—N/a	—N/a	—N/a
18–19 January 2003	FOM	45%	10%	8%	4%	6%	2%	7%	—N/a	2%	1%	0%	—N/a	—N/a	—N/a	—N/a
25–26 January 2003	FOM	48%	9%	7%	5%	7%	3%	4%	—N/a	2%	1%	1%	—N/a	—N/a	—N/a	—N/a
1–2 February 2003	FOM	47%	9%	8%	3%	6%	1%	4%	—N/a	1%	3%	1%	—N/a	—N/a	—N/a	—N/a
14 March 2004	Election result in Moscow	68.61%	—N/a	—N/a	—N/a	—N/a	—N/a	—N/a	—N/a	—N/a	—N/a	—N/a	6.60%	—N/a	—N/a	Khakamada 8.20%, Kharitonov 7.39%, Glazyev 6.29%, Malyshkin 1.23%, Mironov 0.62%

=== Northwestern Federal District ===
Date	Agency	Putin	Zyuganov	Yavlinsky	Zhirinovsky	Luzhkov	Nemtsov	Primakov	Kiriyenko	Shoygu	Tuleyev	Kasyanov	Against All	Undecided	Wouldn't vote	Additional candidates
12–13 May 2001	FOM	51%	8%	5%	5%	1%	—N/a	6%	2%	2%	5%	0%	4%	5%	8%	—N/a
19–20 May 2001	FOM															
26–27 May 2001	FOM															
2–3 June 2001	FOM															
9–10 June 2001	FOM															
16–17 June 2001	FOM															
23–24 June 2001	FOM															
30 June–July 1, 2001	FOM															
7–8 July 2001	FOM															
14–15 July 2001	FOM															
21–22 July 2001	FOM															
28–29 July 2001	FOM															
4–5 August 2001	FOM															
11–12 August 2001	FOM															
18–19 August 2001	FOM															
25–26 August 2001	FOM															
1–2 September 2001	FOM															
8–9 September 2001	FOM															
15–16 September 2001	FOM															
22–23 September 2001	FOM															
29–30 September 2001	FOM															
6–7 October 2001	FOM															
13–14 October 2001	FOM															
27–28 October 2001	FOM															
3–4 November 2001	FOM															
10–11 November 2001	FOM															
17–18 November 2001	FOM															
24–25 November 2001	FOM															
1–2 December 2001	FOM															
8–9 December 2001	FOM															
15–16 December 2001	FOM															
22–23 December 2001	FOM															

==== Exit polls ====
Agency	Putin	Kharitonov	Glazyev	Khakamada	Malyshkin	Mironov	Against all
FOM	75.2%	8.0%	3.4%	5.3%	1.6%	1.2%	5.2%

=== Siberian Federal District ===
Date	Agency	Putin	Zyuganov	Yavlinsky	Zhirinovsky	Luzhkov	Nemtsov	Primakov	Kiriyenko	Shoygu	Tuleyev	Kasyanov	Against All	Undecided	Wouldn't vote	Additional candidates
12–13 May 2001	FOM															
19–20 May 2001	FOM															
26–27 May 2001	FOM															
2–3 June 2001	FOM															
9–10 June 2001	FOM															
16–17 June 2001	FOM															
23–24 June 2001	FOM															
30 June–July 1, 2001	FOM															
7–8 July 2001	FOM															
14–15 July 2001	FOM															
21–22 July 2001	FOM															
28–29 July 2001	FOM															
4–5 August 2001	FOM															
11–12 August 2001	FOM															
18–19 August 2001	FOM															
25–26 August 2001	FOM															
1–2 September 2001	FOM															
8–9 September 2001	FOM															
15–16 September 2001	FOM															
22–23 September 2001	FOM															
29–30 September 2001	FOM															
6–7 October 2001	FOM															
13–14 October 2001	FOM															
27–28 October 2001	FOM															
3–4 November 2001	FOM															
10–11 November 2001	FOM															
17–18 November 2001	FOM															
24–25 November 2001	FOM															
1–2 December 2001	FOM															
8–9 December 2001	FOM															
15–16 December 2001	FOM															
22–23 December 2001	FOM															

==== Exit polls ====
Agency	Putin	Kharitonov	Glazyev	Khakamada	Malyshkin	Mironov	Against all
FOM	66.2%	14.8%	6.3%	4.2%	2.3%	0.9%	5.3%

=== Southern Federal District ===
Date	Agency	Putin	Zyuganov	Yavlinsky	Zhirinovsky	Luzhkov	Nemtsov	Primakov	Kiriyenko	Shoygu	Tuleyev	Kasyanov	Against All	Undecided	Wouldn't vote	Additional candidates
13–14 January 2001	FOM	53%	19%	1%	1%	0%	—N/a	1%	1%	4%	2%	0%	4%	7%	8%	—N/a
20–21 January 2001	FOM	56%	19%	1%	2%	1%	—N/a	2%	2%	2%	0%	2%	2%	4%	8%	—N/a
27–28 January 2001	FOM	41%	23%	3%	2%	0%	—N/a	2%	3%	3%	1%	0%	7%	7%	8%	—N/a
3–4 February 2001	FOM	54%	16%	1%	1%	0%	—N/a	3%	2%	2%	2%	1%	5%	5%	9%	—N/a
10–11 February 2001	FOM	39%	18%	2%	5%	1%	—N/a	2%	0%	5%	4%	1%	5%	8%	11%	—N/a
17–18 February 2001	FOM	43%	20%	2%	4%	1%	—N/a	2%	1%	3%	5%	2%	3%	4%	11%	—N/a
24–25 February 2001	FOM	38%	23%	1%	5%	2%	—N/a	2%	3%	3%	1%	1%	1%	16%	5%	—N/a
3–4 March 2001	FOM	51%	12%	3%	2%	1%	—N/a	2%	1%	1%	0%	1%	6%	10%	12%	—N/a
10–11 March 2001	FOM	38%	23%	1%	5%	2%	—N/a	1%	2%	3%	0%	1%	8%	7%	10%	—N/a
17–18 March 2001	FOM	48%	19%	1%	2%	1%	—N/a	1%	0%	1%	2%	0%	5%	10%	10%	—N/a
24–25 March 2001	FOM	37%	26%	3%	5%	0%	—N/a	5%	0%	1%	3%	1%	4%	9%	6%	—N/a
31 March–1 April 2001	FOM	48%	24%	1%	4%	0%	—N/a	4%	0%	3%	2%	1%	3%	4%	8%	—N/a
7–8 April 2001	FOM	32%	22%	6%	4%	4%	—N/a	1%	2%	2%	4%	0%	7%	4%	13%	—N/a
14–15 April 2001	FOM	43%	23%	1%	5%	1%	1%	3%	—N/a	2%	2%	0%	7%	4%	9%	—N/a
21–22 April 2001	FOM	43%	18%	2%	7%	1%	—N/a	3%	0%	2%	1%	1%	4%	8%	9%	—N/a
5–6 May 2001	FOM	45%	18%	1%	5%	2%	1%	1%	—N/a	1%	6%	0%	4%	8%	9%	—N/a
12–13 May 2001	FOM	46%	18%	4%	5%	1%	1%	2%	—N/a	1%	2%	1%	3%	8%	7%	—N/a
19–20 May 2001	FOM															
26–27 May 2001	FOM															
2–3 June 2001	FOM															
9–10 June 2001	FOM															
16–17 June 2001	FOM															
23–24 June 2001	FOM															
30 June–July 1, 2001	FOM															
7–8 July 2001	FOM															
14–15 July 2001	FOM															
21–22 July 2001	FOM															
28–29 July 2001	FOM															
4–5 August 2001	FOM															
11–12 August 2001	FOM															
18–19 August 2001	FOM															
25–26 August 2001	FOM															
1–2 September 2001	FOM															
8–9 September 2001	FOM															
15–16 September 2001	FOM															
22–23 September 2001	FOM															
29–30 September 2001	FOM															
6–7 October 2001	FOM															
13–14 October 2001	FOM															
27–28 October 2001	FOM															
3–4 November 2001	FOM															
10–11 November 2001	FOM															
17–18 November 2001	FOM															
24–25 November 2001	FOM															
1–2 December 2001	FOM															
8–9 December 2001	FOM															
15–16 December 2001	FOM															
22–23 December 2001	FOM															

==== Exit polls ====
Agency	Putin	Kharitonov	Glazyev	Khakamada	Malyshkin	Mironov	Against all
FOM	69.5%	15.5%	3.7%	3.8%	1.9%	1.0%	4.7%

=== Ural Federal District ===
Date	Agency	Putin	Zyuganov	Yavlinsky	Zhirinovsky	Luzhkov	Nemtsov	Primakov	Kiriyenko	Shoygu	Tuleyev	Kasyanov	Against All	Undecided	Wouldn't vote	Additional candidates
12–13 May 2001	FOM	60%	16%													
19–20 May 2001	FOM	40%	9%													
26–27 May 2001	FOM	61%	10%													
2–3 June 2001	FOM	45%	9%													
9–10 June 2001	FOM	48%	9%													
16–17 June 2001	FOM															
23–24 June 2001	FOM															
30 June–July 1, 2001	FOM															
7–8 July 2001	FOM															
14–15 July 2001	FOM															
21–22 July 2001	FOM															
28–29 July 2001	FOM															
4–5 August 2001	FOM															
11–12 August 2001	FOM															
18–19 August 2001	FOM															
25–26 August 2001	FOM															
1–2 September 2001	FOM															
8–9 September 2001	FOM															
15–16 September 2001	FOM															
22–23 September 2001	FOM															
29–30 September 2001	FOM															
6–7 October 2001	FOM															
13–14 October 2001	FOM															
27–28 October 2001	FOM															
3–4 November 2001	FOM															
10–11 November 2001	FOM															
17–18 November 2001	FOM															
24–25 November 2001	FOM															
1–2 December 2001	FOM															
8–9 December 2001	FOM															
15–16 December 2001	FOM															
22–23 December 2001	FOM															

==== Exit polls ====
Agency	Putin	Kharitonov	Glazyev	Khakamada	Malyshkin	Mironov	Against all
FOM	72.4%	8.9%	4.1%	5.2%	3.0%	1.0%	5.6%

=== Volga Federal District ===
Date	Agency	Putin	Zyuganov	Yavlinsky	Zhirinovsky	Luzhkov	Primakov	Kiriyenko	Shoygu	Tuleyev	Kasyanov	Against All	Undecided	Wouldn't vote
12–13 May 2001	FOM	46	15	3	6	1	3	0	2	6	1	6	5	6
19–20 May 2001	FOM	42	18	2	5	2	4	1	3	1	2	4	8	10
26–27 May 2001	FOM	47	19	2	5	1	1	2	3	2	1	3	6	8
2–3 Jun 2001	FOM	45	14	3	5	0	1	3	3	5	0	5	7	10
9–10 Jun 2001	FOM	47	18	4	4	0	1	2	3	4	1	4	5	7
16–17 Jun 2001	FOM	49	14	2	4	0	1	2	2	3	1	8	8	8
23–24 Jun 2001	FOM	50	16	3	1	1	2	4	4	2	1	6	4	7
30 Jun–1 Jul 2001	FOM	52	12	2	3	1	2	1	3	2	0	7	8	7
7–8 Jul 2001	FOM	44	17	2	5	1	2	1	4	4	2	4	6	9
14–15 Jul 2001	FOM	45	13	2	3	1	2	2	3	2	0	8	9	10
21–22 Jul 2001	FOM	49	17	0	5	0	5	1	4	4	0	5	4	5
28–29 Jul 2001	FOM	48	17	2	3	1	0	0	2	3	2	4	10	8
4–5 Aug 2001	FOM	50	17	2	4	1	1	1	3	2	2	3	7	5
11–12 Aug 2001	FOM	46	11	2	3	1	2	3	4	3	0	5	8	11
18–19 Aug 2001	FOM	47	22	1	2	1	2	2	3	1	0	5	7	8
25–26 Aug 2001	FOM	49	14	4	3	2	1	0	2	3	1	3	11	7
1–2 Sep 2001	FOM	46	21	1	3	1	0	1	3	3	1	1	7	11
8–9 Sep 2001	FOM	47	14	1	1	1	2	0	3	3	0	7	10	9
15–16 Sep 2001	FOM	48	17	2	3	0	4	2	2	2	1	3	8	8
22–23 Sep 2001	FOM	46	14	2	2	1	3	2	3	2	0	4	11	10
29–30 Sep 2001	FOM	56	18	2	3	1	1	0	2	2	0	4	6	5
6–7 Oct 2001	FOM	52	14	1	6	0	1	1	2	2	0	2	9	11
13–14 Oct 2001	FOM	54	15	1	3	0	2	0	5	3	0	4	7	6
20–21 Oct 2001	FOM	48	17	1	4	1	2	2	4	2	0	4	8	7
27–28 Oct 2001	FOM	51	12	1	4	1	1	3	4	3	0	5	8	7
3–4 Nov 2001	FOM	44	11	2	7	1	1	3	2	2	2	6	8	11
10–11 Nov 2001	FOM	54	10	1	3	1	2	3	2	3	0	4	11	7
17–18 Nov 2001	FOM	53	14	1	4	0	1	1	3	1	0	3	12	6
24–25 Nov 2001	FOM	55	16	3	2	1	1	1	2	3	0	3	6	8
1–2 Dec 2001	FOM	57	17	1	3	1	2	0	3	2	2	2	4	6
8–9 Dec 2001	FOM	57	12	0	4	1	3	0	4	2	0	3	6	8
15–16 Dec 2001	FOM	63	10	0	3	0	1	1	2	1	1	5	8	4
22–23 Dec 2001	FOM	52	15	0	4	1	3	1	2	1	1	6	8	7

==== Exit polls ====
Agency	Putin	Kharitonov	Glazyev	Khakamada	Malyshkin	Mironov	Against all
FOM	70.6	13.0	4.0	4.2	2.4	1.2	4.7

== Hypothetical polling ==
Date	Agency	Glazyev	Khakamada	Against all
15–20 Jan 2004	ROMIR	13	4	51
