= Malyshkin =

Malyshkin (Russian: Малышкин, from малышка meaning baby, little thing) is a Russian masculine surname, its feminine counterpart is Malyshkina. It may refer to

- Oleg Malyshkin (born 1951), Russian politician
- 263940 Malyshkina, a minor planet
