= Alexey Chernyshov =

Russian politician (born 1963)

- Алексей Чернышёв
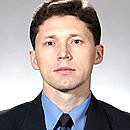

Member of the State Duma
- In office 29 December 2003 – 24 December 2007

Personal details
- Born: 29 March 1963 (age 63) Saratov, Russia, Soviet Union
- Party: Liberal Democratic Party of Russia

Alexey Gennadiyevich Chernyshov (Russian: Алексей Геннадиевич Чернышов; born 24 February 1963 in Saratov) is a Russian politician and former member of the State Duma of Russia (2003–2007).

In 1989 he graduated from the Saratov State University. Doctor of political sciences. Chernyshov taught at Saratov Economic Institute and Volga Academy of Public Administration. He was a member of Saratov City Duma in 1997–2003.

== Deputy of the State Duma ==
In 2003, he ran successfully for the 4th State Duma on LDPR list and became deputy chairman of the Duma Education and Science Committee. Chernyshov was considered possible Liberal Democratic candidate in the 2004 Russian presidential election. His support at the convention was relatively low and as a result, State Duma member Oleg Malyshkin was nominated from LDPR.
