= Vladimir Putin 2000 presidential campaign =

First political campaign by Russian leader

Vladimir Putin for President
- Campaign: 2000 Russian presidential election
- Candidate: Vladimir Putin; Incumbent Prime Minister and Acting President of Russia
- Affiliation: Independent
- Status: Announced: 13 January 2000; Won election: 26 March 2000
- Key people: Chief of staff: Dmitry Medvedev; Strategist: Gleb Pavlovsky

Website
- putin2000.ru (archive)

The 2000 presidential campaign of Vladimir Putin, Prime Minister of Russia, was announced on 13 January 2000, during his trip to Saint Petersburg.

This campaign was the first presidential campaign of Vladimir Putin.

== Background ==
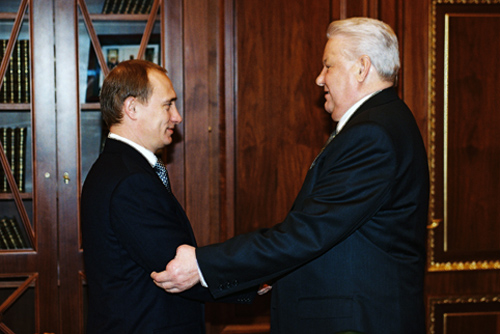
Boris Yeltsin with Vladimir Putin on 31 December 1999 after Yeltsin's resignation

On 9 August 1999, Boris Yeltsin dismissed Prime Minister Sergei Stepashin and appointed Vladimir Putin as the new Prime Minister. On the same day, in his televised address, Yeltsin said that the best choice would be the election of Putin as President, in the election to be held in the summer of 2000.

In December 1999, legislative elections were held and the Communist Party headed by Gennady Zyuganov won again. The second place was taken by the party Unity headed by Sergey Shoygu and supported by Vladimir Putin. Third place was taken by the party Fatherland - All Russia headed by former Prime Minister Yevgeny Primakov and Moscow Mayor Yury Luzhkov.

In mid-1999, Primakov and Luzhkov were considered the frontrunners for the presidency. Both were critical of Yeltsin, and he feared that they might prosecute him and his “Family” for corruption should they ascend to power. Primakov had suggested that he would be “freeing up jail cells for the economic criminals he planned to arrest.” In December 1999 Yury Luzhkov was re-elected as Mayor of Moscow, and announced that he would not compete for the presidency; Primakov pulled out two weeks after the legislative elections. In this regard, the main rival of Putin was Gennady Zyuganov.

At noon, on 31 December 1999, Boris Yeltsin, in his televised address, announced his resignation. In accordance with article 92 of the Russian Constitution, Prime Minister Vladimir Putin became the Acting President, and early presidential elections were scheduled for March 2000.

== Strategy ==
Putin's campaign strategy concentrated on image over policy. Rather than taking bold positions, he instead focused on cultivating the electorate's positive perception of him.

Putin, who enjoyed favorable coverage on two of the three major Russian television networks, was disparaging towards the notion of running traditional televised campaign adverts.

== Campaign ==
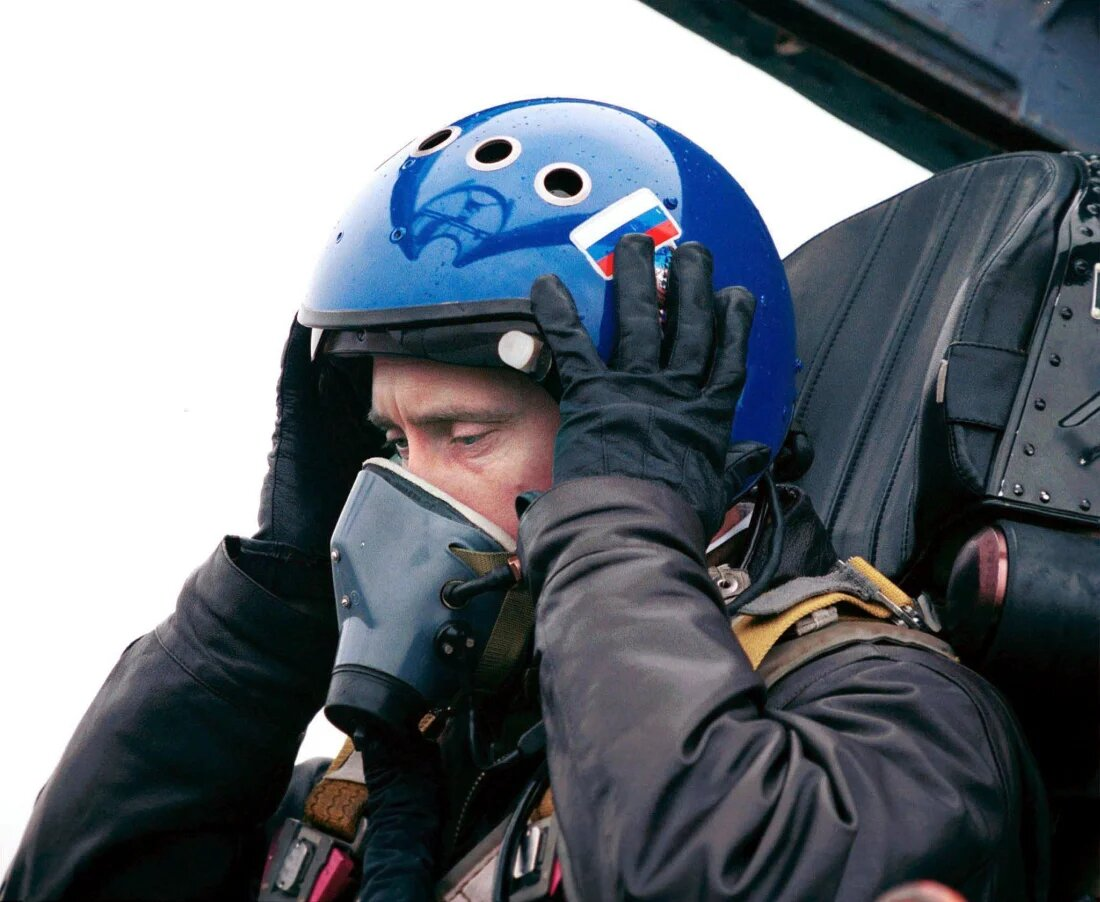
Vladimir Putin arrived in Grozny on a SU-27 fighter jet

On 12 January 2000, in Moscow "President-hotel" took place the meeting of the initiative group to nominate Vladimir Putin as a presidential candidate. It included about 200 people, in particular President of Tatarstan Mintimer Shaimiev, Sergey Mironov, head of tax police Viktor Zubkov, etc.

On 13 January, Vladimir Putin visited St. Petersburg State University, where he received a mantle and a diploma of honorary doctor of law. During his speech, he said that the day before "learned about the creation in Moscow initiative group." According to Putin, he has not yet planned to announce his readiness to run for President but "in this solemn atmosphere I would like to say that I am pleased to accept the proposal".

On 7 February, representatives of the initiative group to nominate Vladimir Putin submitted 574,128 signatures to the Central Election Commission. After a random inspection, 1.48% of them were found to be unreliable (with a maximum of 15% established by law).

On 15 February, Vladimir Putin was registered as a presidential candidate, he was the third after Gennady Zyuganov and Alexey Podberezkin. On the same day, has been shaped by his campaign headquarters. Headquarters was headed by Dmitry Medvedev, who at that time held the position of Kremlin Deputy Chief of Staff. Among the leaders of the election campaign was also the FSB Deputy Director Viktor Cherkesov, chiefs of managements of Presidential Administration Alexander Abramov and Vladislav Surkov. The program and election strategy of the candidate was developed by the head of the strategic development fund Herman Gref and one of the heads of the effective policy fund Gleb Pavlovsky. One of Putin's proxies was the former Mayor of St. Petersburg Anatoly Sobchak, who died on the night of 19–20 February during a trip to Kaliningrad Oblast, undertaken as part of the election campaign. A public reception of presidential candidate Vladimir Putin was opened to organize communication with voters.

On 25 February, Putin's election program "Open letter of Vladimir Putin to Russian voters" was published in three Federal Newspapers. In it, he stated three priorities of his policy: the fight against poverty, "protecting the market from illegal invasion, both official and criminal", the formation of foreign policy, "based on the national interests of their own country." According to Vladimir Putin, the slogan of his election campaign "it is a decent life,<...> in the sense that it is wanted and believed by the majority of my fellow citizens".

On 29 February, a draw was held for the distribution of free airtime on television and radio channels. During the election campaign, Vladimir Putin was the only presidential candidate who refused to participate in TV debates with other candidates.

Putin benefited from strong approval for the Second Chechen War, which aroused strong support from Russians stinging from a loss in national prestige following the dissolution of the Soviet Union. However, some observers believed a dip in public support for the conflict at the end of the election period may have contributed to Putin carrying a smaller portion of the vote than polls had predicted him to.

In the month of March, Putin saw a decline in support. Some speculation attributed this to the waning of Putin's "honeymoon period" as a new leader. Other speculation attributed this to voters paying more attention to the election at the end of the campaign period, and thus discovering aspects that they liked about Putin's opponents. Leonid Sedov, the director of the Moscow-based polling firm Public Opinion Foundation (FOM), declared that from his analysis, "The decline is among those people who like Putin, but do not vote for him. They have nothing against him; they think his policies are quite all right. But they were going to vote for other persons anyway."

In the final week before the election, Putin's campaign began an intense effort to recuperate some of the support he had lost. This partially entailed issuing attacks against the challengers that the campaign believed had captured voters away from Putin. Foremost among the candidates which the campaign focused this effort on was Grigory Yavlinsky.

On the morning of 20 March, a week before the election, Vladimir Putin flew from Krasnodar to Grozny on the SU-27 combat training fighter, which increased his rating. While Putin made ample use of his advantage of incumbency to bolster his image directly through the use of the Russian military, his government opened an investigation against Yavlinsky which placed him under suspicion of illegally campaigning on a military base.

On 21 March, ORT (a media outlet controlled by Putin-aligned businessman Boris Berezovsky) aired numerous broadcasts which alleged that Jews, gays, and foreigners were the primary groups supporting Yavlinsky's campaign, thus painting Yavlinsky's candidacy with associations that would repulse voters who held antisemitic, homophobic or xenophobic sentiments. With the Russian populace having a strong level of animosity towards minority groups, these reports were intended to harm Yavlinsky's appeal. Putin's campaign strategist Gleb Pavlovsky denied the campaign's involvement in coordinating these reports and refuted the notion that Putin benefited from it, declaring, "Many mysterious and silly things happen during the campaign. I know nothing about Mr. Yavlinsky's sexual orientation, and I know nothing about events that take place in the gay community. If it was staged, it did Putin nothing but harm."

== Platform and positions ==
Putin opted to largely avoid taking many consequential and specific policy stances during the campaign. He instead laid out a rather vague agenda.

Putin characterized Russia's military involvement in Chechnya to be both an "anti-terrorist operation" and "the place where Russia's fate is being decided." He stated, "Unfortunately, not everyone in Western nations understands this, but we will not tolerate any humiliation to the national pride of Russian or any threat to the territorial integrity of the country." This indicated that Putin was in favor of reversing the 1996 agreement which had granted Chechnya de facto independence.

Putin voiced support for the establishment of a "strong state" in Russia. Putin stated, "Russia will not soon become, if it ever becomes, a second copy of, say, the U.S. or England, where liberal values have deep historic roots. A strong state for Russians is not an anomaly, not something that must be fought against, but on the contrary is the source and guarantor of order, the initiator and main driving force of all change" Putin clarified that a strong state can mean "a streamlined structure of the bodies of state authority and management, higher professionalism, more discipline and responsibility of civil servants, keener struggle against corruption; a restructuring of state personnel policy on the basis of a selection of the best staffs; creating conditions beneficial for the rise in the country of a full-blooded civil society to balance out and monitor the authorities; a larger role and higher authority for the judiciary; improved federative relations, including in the sphere of budgets and finances; and an active offensive on crime."

Putin advocated for the state to take a commanding role in coordinating a measured transition of the Russian economy to a free market. Putin declared that this, "naturally exceeds the common-place formula which limits the state's role in the economy to devising rules of the game and controlling their observance. With time, we are likely to evolve to this formula. But today's situation necessitates deeper state involvement in the social and economic processes." Putin particularly called for the creation of an "energetic industrial policy" to stimulate the economy.

Putin took a stance in favor of foreign investment, which he declared was integral Russian economic recovery (and without which he believed recovery would be "long and painful").

Putin took several stances on trade issues. He was in favor of Russia joining the World Trade Organization. In addition, he also advocated for counteracting discrimination other nations had adopted against Russian exports. He also called for the introduction of anti-dumping legislation to prevent other nations from exporting their toxic waste to Russia.

Putin declared concern for Russia's place in the world, having stated in December 1999, "For the first time in the past 200–300 years, Russia is facing a real threat of sliding to the second, and possibly even the third, echelon of world states. We must strain all intellectual physical and moral forces of the nation. Nobody will do it for us. Everything depends on us, and us alone." Two months prior he had similarly declared, "We must stop the process of our being left behind by the economically developed nations of the world, and find the path which will allow us to take up a suitable place in the ranks of leading nations in the 21st century." Putin also had written, "It will take us approximately fifteen years and an annual growth of our Gross Domestic Product by 8 percent a year to reach the per capita GDP level of present-day Portugal or Spain, which are not among the world's industrialized leaders." Putin took a stance against criminal enterprise and the black market.

== Result ==
Vladimir Putin won the elections in the first round, gaining more than 52% of the vote.

Putin under performed compared to polls, which had projected him to carry around 57% of the vote. In his acceptance address, Putin seemed to acknowledge that (despite having carried a double digit margin above any other competitor) he had only won a narrow-majority of the overall vote. Putin framed his gratitude to the Russian voters by declaring, "even a half-percentage point is a huge credit from the population."

Putin's carried a plurality in nearly every part of the country. However, he was largely able to compile a majority (and avoid a runoff) due to the strength of his performance in European Russia. Putin's showing in the Russian Far East was regarded to be disappointingly weak. In a number of federal subjects there, such as Chukotka A.O. and Primorsky Krai, Putin failed to carry an outright majority of the vote.

Putin additionally had failed to receive an outright majority of the vote in Russia's capital city of Moscow, where he received only 46% of the vote.

Putin carried a plurality of the vote in every federal subject except for five which were carried by Gennady Zyuganov (Adygea, Altai Republic, Bryansk Oblast, Lipetsk Oblast, Omsk Oblast) and one which was carried by Aman Tuleyev (Kemerovo Oblast).

== See also ==
- Vladimir Putin 2004 presidential campaign
- Vladimir Putin 2012 presidential campaign
- Vladimir Putin 2018 presidential campaign
