= Sergey Glazyev =

Russian politician and economist

- Сергей Глазьев
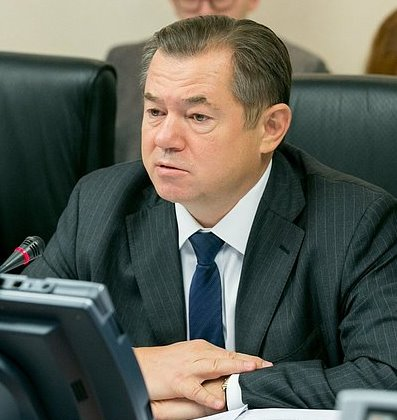
- Glazyev in 2016

General Secretary of the Union State of Russia and Belarus
- Incumbent
- Assumed office 17 April 2025
- Preceded by: Dmitry Mezentsev

Adviser to the President of Russia
- In office 30 July 2012 – 9 October 2019
- President: Vladimir Putin

Leader of the Rodina
- In office 4 September 2003 – 15 February 2004
- Succeeded by: Dmitry Rogozin

Minister of Foreign Economic Relations of Russia
- In office 23 December 1992 – 22 September 1993
- President: Boris Yeltsin
- Prime Minister: Viktor Chernomyrdin
- Preceded by: Pyotr Aven
- Succeeded by: Oleg Davydov

Personal details
- Born: Sergey Yuryevich Glazyev; 1 January 1961 (age 65) Zaporizhzhia, Ukrainian SSR, Soviet Union
- Education: Moscow State University
- Website: http://glazev.ru

Sergey Yuryevich Glazyev (Russian: Сергей Юрьевич Глазьев; born 1 January 1961) is a Russian politician and economist, member of the National Financial Council of the Bank of Russia, and, since 2008, a full member of the Russian Academy of Sciences. Glazyev was minister of Foreign Economic Relations in Boris Yeltsin's cabinet from 1992 to 1993, a member of the State Duma from 1993 to 2007, one of the leaders of the electoral bloc Rodina from 2003 to 2004, a candidate for the Presidency of the Russian Federation in 2004, and advisor to the president of the Russian Federation on regional economic integration from 2012 to 2019. Between 2021 and 2024, he was the Commissioner for Integration and Macroeconomics within the Eurasian Economic Commission, the executive body of the Eurasian Economic Union. As of 2026, he is the General Secretary of the Union State of Russia and Belarus.

== Biography ==
Born in Zaporizhzhia, in the Ukrainian SSR as the son of a Russian father and a Ukrainian mother, Glazyev attended Moscow State University, earning a Doctor of Philosophy in economics. He entered government service in 1991, becoming First Deputy Minister of External Economic Relations in the cabinet of Yegor Gaidar. He served in this capacity for a year, and then was promoted to Minister by Viktor Chernomyrdin, serving until 1993, when he resigned.

Elected to the State Duma as a member of the Democratic Party of Russia in 1993, he first associated with his then-friend, and later bitter rival, Dmitry Rogozin. He resigned from office before his first four-year term was complete, as he had been named economic security advisor for the Federation Council of Russia and head of the Council's analytical department. He was also associated with Rogozin and Aleksandr Lebed in the short-lived nationalist political project, the Congress of Russian Communities.

In 1999, he resigned once again to run for the State Duma, and was elected this time as an independent on the list of the Communist Party of the Russian Federation. This time, however, he clashed with the party's leadership and, in 2003, he abandoned the party to help form Rodina (Motherland), a nationalist bloc on the right-wing of the Russian political spectrum. That year, he became one of 37 Rodina candidates elected to the State Duma. Other prominent candidates included Dmitry Rogozin, Chairman of the Duman Foreign Affairs Committee and co-chairman (with Glazyev) of Rodina, and also former Central Bank head Viktor Gerashchenko.

In 2004, both Glazyev and Gerashchenko sought the presidency on separate tickets, with Rodina's leaders voting to remain neutral in the contest. Gerashchenko was nominated as the candidate of one of the minor parties that made up the Rodina coalition, which led to the Central Election Commission refusing to place him on the ballot, as he had not been nominated by the whole party. Glazyev, who had nominated himself as an Independent, did not have any such problems, and appeared on the ballot.

During the election, Glazyev portrayed himself as a champion of social justice and an opponent of political corruption, particularly in the form of the Russian oligarchs. He pledged to write a guarantee of a high standard of living into the constitution, provide universal health care and free public education, triple the minimum wage, protect the rights of trade unions, redistribute the wealth belonging to the oligarchs, and increase economic growth. He also promised to eradicate the notorious Russian Mafia, purge corrupt bureaucrats and police, and protect the country from terrorism. This platform proved to be moderately popular, and Glazyev received 2,826,641 votes, or 4.1%–third place out of a field of six.

Following the election, Rogozin, who had long sought to remove his rival from party power, succeeded in getting the party rank-and-file to vote Glazyev out as co-chairman, leaving Rogozin in control. This led to Glazyev and his supporters attempting to form their own party, called For a Decent Life, although this, too, suffered a setback when the Ministry of Justice refused to recognize the validity of the party.

Following a split between Rogozin and Sergei Baburin in 2005, Glazyev re-joined the Rodina faction and reconciled with his former political partner. After Rogozin was replaced as party leader by Aleksander Babakov in early 2006, Rodina merged with the Russian Party of Life and the Russian Pensioners' Party in 2006 to create a new party, Fair Russia.

Glazyev announced his retirement from politics in March 2007, and said that he did not intend to seek a further term in the Duma, arguing that Vladimir Putin's rule had crowded out all forms of political opposition and debate in the country.

Glazyev endorsed Putin in the 2012 presidential election.

In July 2012, Putin appointed Glazyev as presidential aide for the coordination of the work of federal agencies in developing the Customs Union of Belarus, Kazakhstan, and Russia.

Glazyev has authored more than forty books and hundreds of pamphlets and research papers. One of his books has been published in English translation by the LaRouche movement's Executive Intelligence Review as Genocide: Russia and the New World Order (ISBN 0-943235-16-2). In 1995 he was awarded the Gold Kondratieff Medal by the International N. D. Kondratieff Foundation and the Russian Academy of Natural Sciences (RAEN).

=== Sanctions ===
He was sanctioned by the UK government in 2014 in relation to the Russo-Ukrainian War.

On March 17, 2014, a day after the Crimean status referendum, Glazyev was one of the first seven persons who were placed under executive sanctions by President Obama. The sanctions froze his assets in the US and banned him from entering the United States. However, according to Glazyev, he has not been negatively affected by these sanctions because he has neither property nor accounts of any sort in the United States, nor had he any plans to come to America.

== Views on Russia in the 1990s ==
In his 1999 book, A Genocide: Russia And The New World Order, Glazyev argues that the rate of annual population loss in Russia in the 1990s has been "more than double the rate of loss during the period of Stalinist repression and mass famine in the first half of the 1930s.... There has been nothing like this in the thousand-year history of Russia." Glazyev traces this decline to "the conscious policy of the oligarchy that ruled the country. Its exploitation of power for purposes of personal enrichment effectively led to genocide against the Russian people."

The book then underlines Glazyev's views of the stark choice that confronted Russia on the verge of the 21st century:

Either we passively submit to a suicidal policy of self-destruction and the colonization of Russia, which has been imposed from the outside by deception and graft, or we . . . move to a scientifically grounded strategy for economic growth, improvement of the people's welfare, and restoration of the spiritual-intellectual strength and the scientific and technical potential of the Russian State.

== Views on Ukraine ==
In a 2014 interview with the National Interest, Glazyev said:

The entire crisis in Ukraine was orchestrated, provoked, and financed by American institutions in cooperation with their European partners. They financed neo-Nazis. For fifteen years, the U.S. and Europeans financed neo-Nazis' training, their camps, and preparation. By U.S. Assistant Secretary of State Victoria Nuland's acknowledgement, the State Department spent $5 billion on the creation of an anti-Russian political and paramilitary elite. This work led to the sad situation that now in Ukraine neo-Nazi and neo-fascists ideas prevail, as does admiration for, more than anything, Stepan Bandera's associates who in their time murdered Jews, Ukrainians, Russians, Poles, and whomever they wanted, burning or otherwise killing them under Nazi leadership.

In August 2013 Glazyev said that stating that all Ukrainians favor Ukraine to integrate in the European Union "is some kind of sick self-delusion" and, citing a December 2012 poll, said "surveys by Ukrainian sociological services say something different: 35% of people prefer the European Union and 40% the Customs Union". He blamed "numerous political scientists and experts, who have fed on European and American grants for 20 years, and a whole generation of diplomats and bureaucrats who have appeared after the years of the 'orange' hysteria, who are carrying out an anti-Russian agenda" and "who are too far from the economy and real life, don't really know their country's history and are divorced from its spiritual traditions" for creating "an effect that Ukraine doesn't want".

However, later polls showed an increased support for joining the European Union, surpassing the support for joining the Custom Union. When the Custom Union wasn't mentioned the support reached 50%, with even greater numbers in a poll by German state-owned broadcaster Deutsche Welle, in which people aged 18–65 were interviewed in cities with more than 50,000 inhabitants.

In June 2014, in an interview with the BBC, he called the new President of Ukraine, Petro Poroshenko, illegitimately elected due to the lack of votes in Ukraine's Easternmost provinces; the signing on the 27th of June 2014 of Ukraine–European Union Association Agreement likewise illegitimate. Glazyev also called Poroshenko a Nazi: "Europe is trying to push Ukraine to sign this agreement by force ... They organised [a] military coup in Ukraine, they helped Nazis to come to power. This Nazi government is bombing the largest region in Ukraine." Asked if he believed Mr Poroshenko was a Nazi, he replied: "Of course." (Note: The same day President Putin's spokesman Dmitry Peskov told Russian media that Glazyev's comments did not reflect the official position of the Russian government.)

On 2 July 2014, Glazyev warned about economic consequences following the association of Ukraine with the European Union, "Be objective — the association with the EU imposed on Ukraine by force is leading to the sharp deterioration of the already poor state of Ukraine's economy, the reduction of its competitiveness, the forcing of Ukrainian goods out of the market and drop in their production, increased unemployment and decreased living standards."

By August 2017, Glazyev averred that "Today Ukraine is an occupied territory. There is no legitimate power, there is no one to talk to, there are no people who can take responsibility for the implementation of political agreements. There are only servicemen of American aggressors who receive instructions from the American embassy, from there they receive funding and, in fact, serve American interests in Ukraine."

=== Glazyev tapes ===
In 2016 Ukraine's Prosecutor General Yuriy Lutsenko published wiretaps of telephone calls between Glazyev and a number of people in Ukraine directly involved in organizing pro-Russian demonstrations in Odesa, Kharkiv and other cities in 2014. In the call Glazyev gives instructions on how to increase the impact of these riots and turn them into the occupation of administration buildings, and giving instructions for receiving funding. He also instructs (then recently appointed Prime Minister of Crimea) Sergey Aksyonov on how the Crimean referendum should be formulated.

Specially trained people should knock out “Banderovtsy” from the building council, and then they should arrange the meeting of the regional state administration, gather executive authorities. (...) It is very important for us the Regional State Administration to gather now. And for this it must be provided, as it was done in Kharkiv – in Kharkiv people came into [the regional administration] threw all “Banderovtsy” out, found the ammunition depot, now engage its disposal and will gather Regional State Administration and will also appeal to our President.

In the intercepts Glazyev makes it clear that the riots and protests must look as if they were grassroots and inspired by local residents in spite of the fact that large part of funding for the pro-Russian militants came from Russia. Further investigation also demonstrated significant involvement of Glazyev into the events that led to the tragedy in Odesa on 2 May 2014.

Konstantin Zatulin: That’s the main story. I want to say about other regions – we have financed Kharkiv, financed Odesa. (...)

Sergey Glazyev: So, you paid.

Konstantin Zatulin: Well, there are small sums of 2 thousands, 3 thousands, like these. I have 4 requests signed by Chalyi for 50 thousand.

Sergey Glazyev: Then you have to make a cost estimate, I will give it to those, let them work on the estimate.

In a 2016 (member of the State Duma) Konstantin Zatulin gave an interview for Russian Radio Business FM in which he confirmed that the calls indeed took place, only noting that the recordings were "taken out of context".

== Views on the Russian-American conflict ==
In 2015, Glazyev felt that the American capitalist model was entering an inevitable, very dangerous, phase of self-destruction. We are, he felt, "truly on the verge of a global war." Although this coming war poses a great danger for Russia, Glazyev said that the USA will fail to achieve its hegemonic goals of controlling Russia and the entire world.

Following the August 2017 round of sanctions against the Russian Federation by the American Congress, Glazyev suggested that the USA should be officially designated as an "aggressor country." Believing that United States' power is based in part on the status of the dollar as the world's reserve currency, Glazyev suggested that Russia abandon the dollar and liquidate its sizeable ($110 billion in August 2017) investment in the U.S. Federal Reserve.

== Future prospects ==
Alongside Sergey Lavrov and Dmitry Medvedev, Glazyev is often spoken about as a potential successor of Putin. "In view of the difficult economic situation in the country, the assumption that Glazyev will take perhaps the central position in government is heard more and more often."

== Accusations ==
On 5 July 2014, the head of the Security Service of Ukraine (SBU) Valentyn Nalyvaichenko announced that a criminal action was brought against Glazyev under Ukraine's Criminal Code Article 436 (public appeals for unleashing a military conflict). Glazyev replied that "the SBU in Ukraine exerts the same function as the Gestapo did in the Nazi Germany." In his words, "the SBU is a criminal organization, and its leadership is completely controlled by American secret services."

== 2004 presidential campaign ==
Glazyev ran as an independent candidate in the 2004 Russian presidential election. His campaign slogans were “We’ll take Russia back” and “There is a choice”.

Russians were largely indifferent towards his candidacy, due largely to his unlikelihood of victory.

While he (and other challengers of Putin) had been polling in the single-digits, Glazeyev was seen by observers as the candidate with the most likely chance of experiencing a last-minute surge in support and posing a challenge to Putin, making him seen as a relatively strong candidate compared to others challenging Putin. This partially derived from the fact that his Rodina bloc had seen its share of support surge at the tail end of the 2003 legislative election from nearly zero to 9% (though that can be largely attributed to an effort by the Kremlin to increase support of Rodina to the detriment of the Communist Party). Analysts believed that Glazyev held greater potential than Gennady Zyuganov in appealing to moderate left Russians. This made him the challenger which the Putin campaign was most focused on, as Putin hoped to avoid seeing any opponent achieve a strong enough performance that they might be perceived as a potential frontrunner for the next presidential election.

Glazyev had hoped that he could perform well enough in the election to cement a perception of him as the rising political star of the Russian far-left.

Glazyev had greater name recognition than many of the other candidates that were running against Putin. Glazyev was, arguably, best known as a supporter of raising taxes on the high-earning natural resource companies.

Glazyev declared that, while he found Putin to be a charismatic leader, he considered his policies to be too weak. He criticized Putin for running, "a corrupt and irresponsible regime". In an op-ed he authored, Glazyev declared, "I am running to cleanse the state apparatus of corruption and bureaucratic arbitrariness".

Glazyev had initially failed to receive the backing of Rodina, which had instead nominated Viktor Gerashchenko. Thus, he instead ran as a self-nominated candidate. After Gerashchenko's candidacy was rejected by the Central Election Commission, Glazyev tried to position himself as an alternative candidate to Gerashchenko, should Gerashchenko's attempt to challenge his disqualification falter. However, Rodina co-chair Dmitry Rogozin disavowed Glazyev's candidacy, insisting that Gerashchenko was the only candidate that Rodina was going to support, and that the party would fight in the Supreme Court for the reinstatement of Geraschenko's registration. Behind Rogozin's back (while he was out of the country), Glazyev organized a gathering of Rodina delegates in which the party reorganized as a “social organization,” and elected Glazyev as its sole leader. They relegated Rogozin's position in the party to one of twenty-five members on its governing council. The party, now led by Glazyev, was able to provide support to the independent Glazyev campaign. After the Supreme Court upheld the disqualification of Gerashchenko, the spurned Rogozin personally endorsed Putin rather than supporting Glazyev.

Glazyev ultimately failed to muster the momentum he had hoped for and placed a weak third, capturing only 4.10% of the vote. He managed to perform better in some federal subjects than in others, placing second in Krasnoyarsk with 17% of its vote.

== Bibliography ==
- Genocide: Russia And The New World Order, (1999)
- The Last World War: The U.S. to Move and Lose, (2016)
