= Aleksandr Kurdyumov =

Russian politician

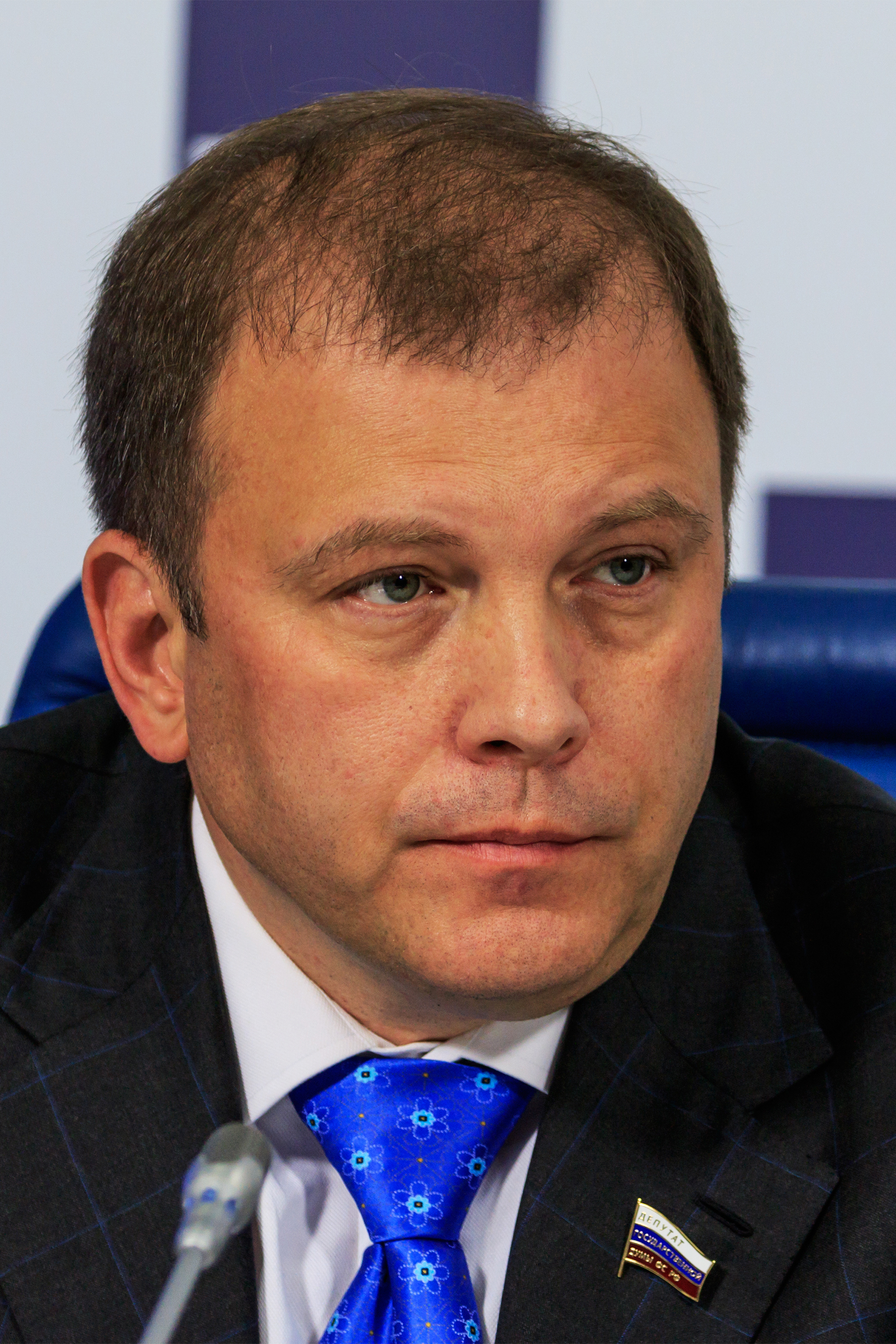
Aleksandr Kurdyumov

Aleksandr Borisovich Kurdyumov (Russian: Александр Борисович Курдюмов, also transliterated Alexander Kurdumov; born November 26, 1967) is a Russian politician who currently serves as a member of the Central Election Commission. From 2003 to 2021, he has been a member of the State Duma. Prior to that, he had been a member of the Legislative Assembly of Nizhny Novgorod Oblast in 2009–2011 and a member of the City Duma of Nizhny Novgorod in 2008–2009. He is a member of the LDPR.

== Awards ==
- 2015 – Jubilee Medal "70 Years of Victory in the Great Patriotic War 1941–1945," awarded by Presidential Decree of the Russian Federation
- 2016 – Medal of the Ministry of Defence of the Russian Federation “Participant in the Military Operation in Syria”
- 2020 – Badge of Honor of the Legislative Assembly of the Nizhny Novgorod Region “For Merit”
