= German Sterligov =

Russian businessman and environmentalist (born 1966)

- Герман Стерлигов
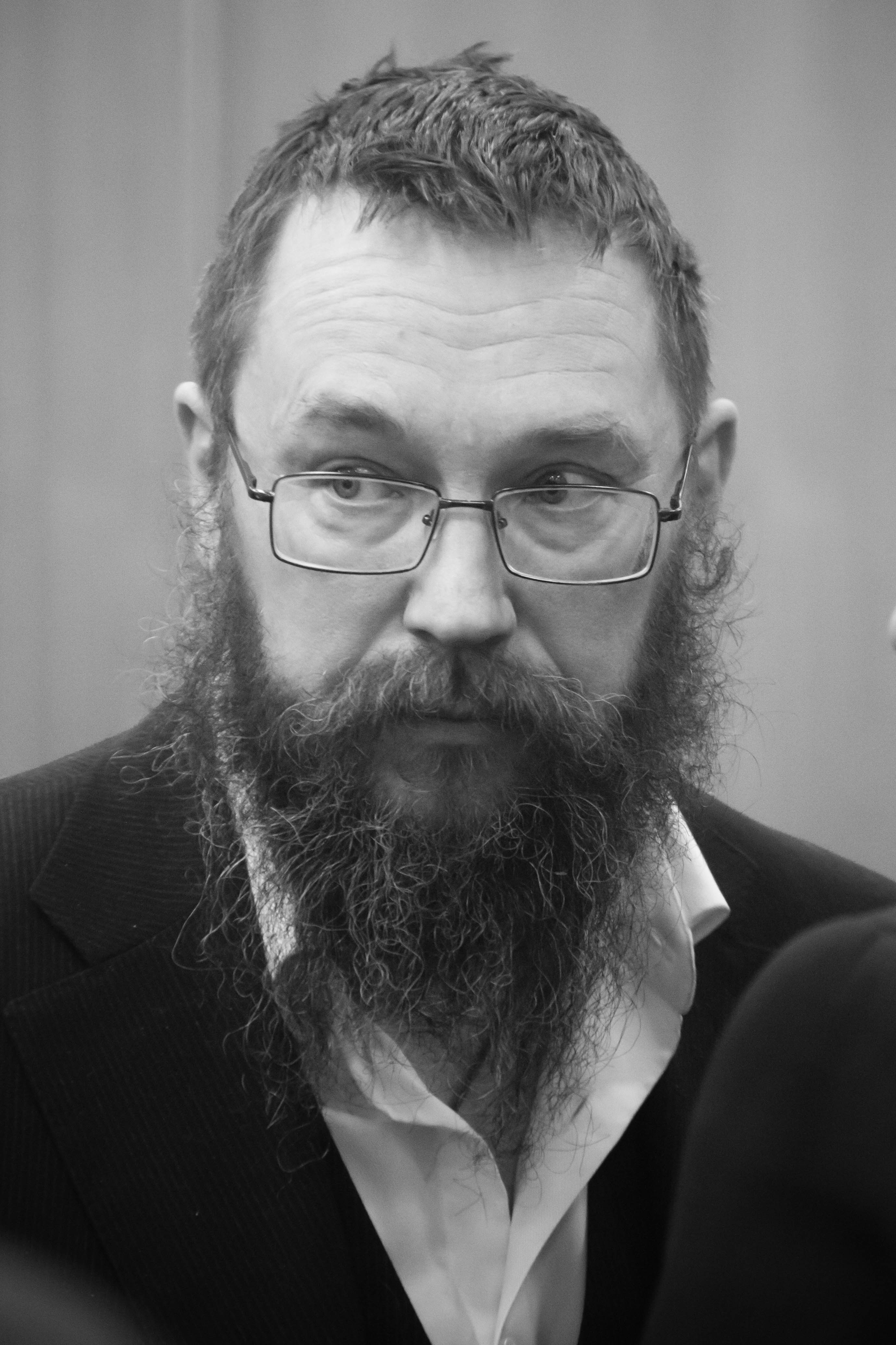
- Sterligov in 2018
- Born: 18 October 1966 (age 60); Zagorsk (now Sergiyev Posad), Russian SFSR, Soviet Union
- Occupations: Businessman; environmentalist
- German Sterligov's voice Sterligov's interview on the Echo of Moscow program, 11 August 2009

German Lvovich Sterligov (Russian: Герман Львович Стерлигов; born 18 October 1966) is a Russian businessman and environmentalist.

== Early life and education ==
German Sterligov was born in Zagorsk (now Sergiyev Posad), Russian SFSR, Soviet Union. He attended college but eventually dropped out.

== Career ==
In 1990, during the dissolution of the USSR, he was instrumental in the founding of the Russian commodities exchange. The exchange is named after his dog, Alisa. After starting a successful company at the age of 24, Sterligov became Russia's first official millionaire. His company employed more than 2,500 people and had offices in New York City and London. After 1996, Sterligov became more devout in his Russian Orthodox faith, however orthodox scholars criticized his misogyny.

He is a nationalist and has participated in several political campaigns. He ran unsuccessfully for governor of the Krasnoyarsk region in Siberia, and mayor of Moscow. In 2004, Sterligov ran for the presidency of Russia, but his candidacy was prevented by the federal government.

During the 2008 financial crisis, Sterligov founded the Anti-Crisis Settlement and Accounting Center, which gave financial support to those exchanging goods and services. He also founded a housing commune for farmers and artisans while providing free social and medical services. A staunch anti-abortionist, Sterligov launched a media campaign against abortion throughout Russia in 2010. In December 2010, Sterligov sent an open letter to Vladimir Putin and Dimitry Medvedev, proposing a suggestion to sell Siberia and the Russian Far East to other countries after transferring ethnic Russians to European Russia.

After his unsuccessful attempt to be a presidential candidate, Sterligov sold most of his assets to live in a forest. He was noted for living in a cottage with his family. He told the BBC that he wished to escape "the mercenary atmosphere, the envy and the hustle" of Moscow. The cottage did not have electricity and was accessible only by horse carriage.

In 2015, Sterligov announced moving to the unrecognised Nagorno-Karabakh Republic with his wife and five children. It was reported that he sold most of his assets in Russia prior to moving to Nagorno-Karabakh. After settling in Nagorno-Karabakh, Sterligov announced plans to start a farming business and stated that his wife would open a designer store. The move caused anger in Azerbaijan whose internationally recognised borders Nagorno-Karabakh lies within. Later Sterligov openly called for the international recognition of the unrecognised state. The Office of the Prosecutor General of Azerbaijan brought an action against Sterligov for making statements against Azerbaijani statehood and for crossing the Azerbaijani border illegally. As of August 2015, Sterligov's family was back in Russia, while he himself was unable to return due to being wanted by Interpol on Azerbaijan's demand.

Sterligov's lawyer, Arthur Airapetov, stated Interpol had suspended its international search for Sterligov on 21 August 2015. In a statement he stated "International police does not search the people wanted for political motives since it contradicts the statute. The Interpol commission has recognized Sterligov's persecution by Azerbaijan as political."
