= Lyubov Sliska =

Russian politician (born 1953)

- Любовь Слиска
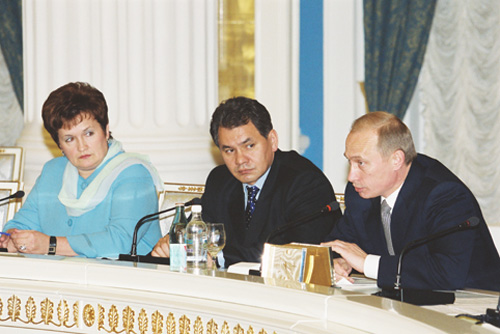
- Sliska in 2001
- Born: Lyubov Timoshina; October 15, 1953 (age 72); Saratov, Soviet Union
- Education: Saratov Law Institute named after Kursky
- Occupation: Politician

Lyubov Konstantinovna Sliska (Russian: Любовь Константиновна Слиска, born October 15, 1953) is a Russian politician.

== Biography ==
Lyubov Konstantinovna Sliska (from Polish as "teardrop") was born on October 15, 1953 in Saratov.

In 1990 she graduated from the Saratov Law Institute named after Kursky.

In 2002 she became one of the first guests of the show "School of Slander" on the Cultura channel.

== Career ==
Lyubov Sliska began her political career in 1996 as deputy head of the Saratov Oblast administration, and later became the governor's representative in the regional Duma.

In 1999 she was elected a deputy to the State Duma of the Russian Federation on the list of the Unity (later United Russia) movement. In the 3rd and 4th convocations of the State Duma, she served as First Vice Speaker and First Deputy Chairman, First Deputy Chairman of the Duma.

When the city council of the Ukrainian town Stryi decided on April 9, 2009 to remove a Soviet-era statue to the Red Army soldier and move it to a museum of Soviet totalitarianism, saying the statue had no historical or cultural value, Sliska stated such decisions could only be made by a "criminal regime". "They have long turned a blind eye to Nazi marches, portraying those who massacred people as heroes", Sliska said, adding the decision revealed lawmakers' disrespect for the soldiers who "liberated Ukraine".

In 2012 Sliska announced her withdrawal from the United Russia party. In June 2012 she was invited to the Saratov Regional Duma from the People's Freedom Party, but Slislka refused.

== Awards ==
- Order of Honour (June 17, 2002)
- Order "For Merit to the Fatherland", II degree
