= Vladimir Putin 2004 presidential campaign =

First re-election campaign of Russian leader

Vladimir Putin for President
- Campaign: 2004 Russian presidential election
- Candidate: Vladimir Putin; Incumbent President of Russia
- Affiliation: Independent
- Key people: Chief of staff: Dmitry Kozak

The 2004 presidential campaign of Vladimir Putin was the first reelection campaign of Russian president Vladimir Putin.

== Background ==
Putin entered the 2004 election with a strong grasp on power and essentially no serious challengers for the presidential elections. During his first term Putin had further consolidated political power in Russia. In his first term as president Putin had overseen an upswing in the economic fortunes of Russia, giving him a strong level of public approval. Approximately three months in advance of the presidential election the Putin-backed United Russia party had swept the 2003 legislative election, while opposition parties experienced a strong decline in support. The legislative elections therefore further weakened opposition to Putin shortly before the election. Even before the legislative elections, observers had considered Russian politics to be more dominated by Putin than it had been by any individual since the fall of the Soviet Union. With Putin consistently leading in the polls by approximately 60%, most prominent opposition figures signaled their intent to forgo competing in the elections.

== Campaign ==
=== Strategy ===
Putin's campaign strategy involved minimal active campaigning on the candidate's part. Taking advantage of his high favorability and incumbency, his strategy was simply to appear presidential.

His campaign undertook negative campaigning against candidates who actively challenged him.

== Favorable media bias ==
Putin had a firm grasp of control over the Russian mediascape, thus allowing him to deny coverage to many of his opponents and circulate favorable coverage about himself.

By sacking Prime Minister Mikhail Kasyanov during the campaign, Putin allowed for Russian political news coverage during the last three weeks of the election campaign to be preoccupied in reporting on the transition from the Kasyanov Cabinet to the Fradkov Cabinet, further depriving his opponents of media coverage.

== Platform ==
For his reelection, Putin put forth a platform with seven priorities. These were to improve Russia's quality of life, provide economic growth, integrate Russia into the global economy, undertake governmental reform (reducing the functions of the state government and the number of officials), health care reform, education reform, protecting the democratic rights and freedoms of Russian citizens, and taking effective antiterrorism measures.

== See also ==
- Vladimir Putin 2000 presidential campaign
- Vladimir Putin 2012 presidential campaign
- Vladimir Putin 2018 presidential campaign
