= List of Russian presidential candidates =

Candidate for President of Russia – people officially registered as a candidate for President of the Russian Federation. As of 2026, 36 people participated in the elections of the President of Russia.

Eight candidates participated in the 2018. Four candidates participated in the next election, held in March 2024.

== 1991 ==
According to the in force at the time Constitution, the President is elected together with the Vice President for five years.

Year	Winning candidate	Losing candidates
1991 (candidates)	Boris Yeltsin / Alexander Rutskoy (Independent)	Nikolai Ryzhkov / Boris Gromov (Communist Party); Vladimir Zhirinovsky / Andrey Zavidiya (Liberal Democratic Party); Aman Tuleyev / Viktor Bocharov (Independent); Albert Makashov / Aleksei Sergeyev (Independent); Vadim Bakatin / Ramazan Abdulatipov (Independent)

== Since 1996 ==
According to the new Constitution, the position of Vice President was abolished, and the President is elected for a six years (until 2012 for a four years).

Year	Winner	Lost in runoff	Other candidates	Withdrew
1996 (candidates)	Boris Yeltsin (Independent)	Gennady Zyuganov (Communist Party)	Alexander Lebed (Congress of Russian Communities); Grigory Yavlinsky (Yabloko); Vladimir Zhirinovsky (Liberal Democratic Party); Svyatoslav Fyodorov (Party of Workers' Self-Government); Mikhail Gorbachev (Independent); Martin Shakkum (Independent); Yury Vlasov (Independent); Vladimir Bryntsalov (Russian Socialist Party)	Aman Tuleyev (Independent)
2000 (candidates)	Vladimir Putin (Independent)	—	Gennady Zyuganov (Communist Party); Grigory Yavlinsky (Yabloko); Aman Tuleyev (Independent); Vladimir Zhirinovsky (Liberal Democratic Party); Konstantin Titov (Independent); Ella Pamfilova (For Civic Dignity); Stanislav Govorukhin (Independent); Yury Skuratov (Independent); Alexey Podberezkin (Spiritual Heritage); Umar Dzhabrailov (Independent)	Yevgeny Savostyanov (Independent)
2004 (candidates)	Vladimir Putin (Independent)	—	Nikolay Kharitonov (Communist Party); Sergey Glazyev (Independent); Irina Khakamada (Independent); Oleg Malyshkin (Liberal Democratic Party); Sergey Mironov (Russian Party of Life)	Ivan Rybkin (Independent)
2008 (candidates)	Dmitry Medvedev (United Russia)	—	Gennady Zyuganov (Communist Party); Vladimir Zhirinovsky (Liberal Democratic Party); Andrei Bogdanov (Democratic Party)	Boris Nemtsov (Union of Right Forces)
2012 (candidates)	Vladimir Putin (United Russia)	—	Gennady Zyuganov (Communist Party); Mikhail Prokhorov (Independent); Vladimir Zhirinovsky (Liberal Democratic Party); Sergey Mironov (A Just Russia)	—
2018 (candidates)	Vladimir Putin (Independent)	—	Pavel Grudinin (Communist Party); Vladimir Zhirinovsky (Liberal Democratic Party); Ksenia Sobchak (Civic Initiative); Grigory Yavlinsky (Yabloko); Boris Titov (Party of Growth); Maxim Suraykin (Communists of Russia); Sergey Baburin (Russian All-People's Union)	—
2024 (candidates)	Vladimir Putin (Independent)	—	Nikolay Kharitonov (Communist Party); Vladislav Davankov (New People); Leonid Slutsky (Liberal Democratic Party)	—

== Facts ==
- The second round to determine the winner was held only once, during the 1996 election.
- Communist party's nominees has always taken second place.
- Most often participated in the elections Vladimir Zhirinovsky (6 times).
- Only 3 women have been presidential candidates: Ella Pamfilova in 2000, Irina Khakamada in 2004 and Ksenia Sobchak in 2018.
- The largest number of presidential candidates (11) were registered in the 2000 election. The smallest number (4) were registered in the 2008 and 2024 elections.
- The youngest presidential candidate was Ksenia Sobchak (aged 36) in the 2018 election, the oldest is Nikolay Kharitonov (aged 75) in the 2024 election.

== See also ==
- President of Russia
- List of presidents of Russia
- Elections in Russia
- Russian presidential elections
- List of Russian presidential candidates by number of votes received
