= List of Russian presidential candidates by number of votes received =

Following is a list of Russian presidential candidates by number of votes received, since the first Russian presidential election in 1991.

== List ==
Winner

Candidate	Year	Party	Popular vote	Notes
Vladimir Putin	2024	Independent	76,277,708	
Vladimir Putin	2018	Independent	56,430,712	
Dmitry Medvedev	2008	United Russia	52,530,712	
Vladimir Putin	2004	Independent	49,558,328	
Vladimir Putin	2012	United Russia	45,602,075	
Boris Yeltsin	1991	Independent	45,552,041	
Boris Yeltsin	1996	Independent	40,203,948	Second round
Vladimir Putin	2000	Independent	39,740,434	
Gennady Zyuganov	1996	Communist Party	30,102,288	Second round
Boris Yeltsin	1996	Independent	26,665,495	First round
Gennady Zyuganov	1996	Communist Party	24,211,686	First round
Gennady Zyuganov	2000	Communist Party	21,928,471	
Nikolai Ryzhkov	1991	Communist Party	13,395,335	
Gennady Zyuganov	2008	Communist Party	13,243,550	
Gennady Zyuganov	2012	Communist Party	12,318,353	
Alexander Lebed	1996	Congress of Russian Communities	10,974,736	
Nikolay Kharitonov	2004	Communist Party	9,514,554	
Pavel Grudinin	2018	Communist Party	8,659,206	
Vladimir Zhirinovsky	2008	Liberal Democratic Party	6,988,510	
Vladimir Zhirinovsky	1991	Liberal Democratic Party	6,211,007	
Mikhail Prokhorov	2012	Independent	5,722,508	
Grigory Yavlinsky	1996	Yabloko	5,550,752	
Aman Tuleyev	1991	Independent	5,417,464	
Vladimir Zhirinovsky	2012	Liberal Democratic Party	4,458,103	
Grigory Yavlinsky	2000	Yabloko	4,351,452	
Vladimir Zhirinovsky	1996	Liberal Democratic Party	4,311,479	
Vladimir Zhirinovsky	2018	Liberal Democratic Party	4,154,985	
Nikolay Kharitonov	2024	Communist Party	3,768,470	
Vladislav Davankov	2024	New People	3,362,484	
Albert Makashov	1991	Independent	2,969,511	
Sergey Glazyev	2004	Independent	2,850,610	
Leonid Slutsky	2024	Liberal Democratic Party	2,795,629	
Sergey Mironov	2012	A Just Russia	2,763,935	
Vadim Bakatin	1991	Independent	2,719,757	
Irina Khakamada	2004	Independent	2,672,189	
Aman Tuleyev	2000	Independent	2,217,361	
Vladimir Zhirinovsky	2000	Liberal Democratic Party	2,026,513	
Oleg Malyshkin	2004	Liberal Democratic Party	1,405,326	
Ksenia Sobchak	2018	Civic Initiative	1,238,031	
Konstantin Titov	2000	Independent	1,107,269	
Andrei Bogdanov	2008	Democratic Party	968,344	
Grigory Yavlinsky	2018	Yabloko	769,644	
Ella Pamfilova	2000	For Civic Dignity	758,966	
Svyatoslav Fyodorov	1996	Party of Workers' Self-Government	699,158	
Boris Titov	2018	Party of Growth	556,801	
Sergey Mironov	2004	Russian Party of Life	524,332	
Maxim Suraykin	2018	Communists of Russia	499,342	
Sergey Baburin	2018	Russian All-People's Union	479,013	
Mikhail Gorbachev	1996	Independent	386,069	
Stanislav Govorukhin	2000	Independent	328,723	
Yury Skuratov	2000	Independent	319,263	
Martin Shakkum	1996	Independent	277,068	
Yury Vlasov	1996	Independent	151,282	
Vladimir Bryntsalov	1996	Russian Socialist Party	123,065	
Alexey Podberezkin	2000	Spiritual Heritage	98,175	
Umar Dzhabrailov	2000	Independent	78,498	
Aman Tuleyev	1996	Independent	308	Withdrew after deadline

== See also ==
- Russian presidential elections
- List of Russian presidential candidates
