= Candidates in the 2000 Russian presidential election =

2000 Russian presidential candidates
- Opinion polls

This article contains the list of candidates associated with the 2000 Russian presidential election.

A total of 33 candidates were nominated; 15 submitted the application forms to the Central Electoral Committee, and ultimately 12 candidates were registered.

== Registered candidates ==
Candidates are listed in the order they appear on the ballot paper (alphabetical order in Russian).

Candidate name and age	Political party	Political offices	Registration date
Stanislav Govorukhin (64)	Nominated by: Initiative group	Deputy of the State Duma (1994–2003 and 2005–2018); Film director	15 February 2000
Umar Dzhabrailov (41)	Nominated by: Initiative group Backed by: Power of Reason	Businessman	18 February 2000
Vladimir Zhirinovsky (53) (campaign)	Nominated by: Liberal Democratic Party	Deputy of the State Duma (1994–2022); Leader of the Liberal Democratic Party (1991–2022)	2 March 2000
Gennady Zyuganov (55) (campaign)	Nominated by: Initiative group Backed by: Communist Party, NPSR	Deputy of the State Duma (1994–present); Leader of the Communist Party (1993–present)	28 January 2000
Ella Pamfilova (46)	Nominated by: For Civic Dignity	Deputy of the State Duma (1994–2000); Minister of Social Protection of the Population of Russia (1991–1994)	15 February 2000
Alexey Podberezkin (47)	Nominated by: Initiative group Backed by: Spiritual Heritage	Deputy of the State Duma (1996–2000)	29 January 2000
Vladimir Putin (47) (campaign)	Nominated by: Initiative group Backed by: Unity, OVR, SPS (majority), Agrarian Party	Acting President of Russia (1999–2000); Prime Minister of Russia (1999–2000); Director of the Federal Security Service (1998–1999)	7 February 2000
Yury Skuratov (47) (campaign)	Nominated by: Initiative group	Prosecutor General of Russia (1995–1999)	18 February 2000
Konstantin Titov (55) (campaign)	Nominated by: Initiative group Backed by: SPS (minority), RPSD	Governor of Samara Oblast (1991–2007)	10 February 2000
Aman Tuleyev (55) (campaign)	Nominated by: Initiative group	Governor of Kemerovo Oblast (1997–2018)	7 February 2000
Grigory Yavlinsky (47) (campaign)	Nominated by: Initiative group Backed by: Yabloko	Deputy of the State Duma (1994–2003); Leader of the Yabloko party (1995–2008)	15 February 2000

=== Withdrawn candidates ===
Candidate name and age	Political party	Political offices	Details	Registration date	Date of withdrawal
Yevgeny Savostyanov (48)	Nominated by: Initiative group	Kremlin Deputy Chief of Staff (1996–1998); Chief of Moscow Directorate of the Federal Counterintelligence Service (1993–1994)	Supported Grigory Yavlinsky.	18 February 2000	21 March 2000

== Rejected nominations ==
Candidate name and age	Political party	Political offices	Rejection date
Anzori Aksentyev (51)	Nominated by: Party of the People	Chairman of the All-Russian Political Party of the People	21 February 2000
Ismail Tagi-Zade (48)	Nominated by: Initiative group	Film producer	19 February 2000

== Declared candidates who withdrew without registering ==
Candidate name and age	Political party	Positions
Tamara Bazyleva (59)	Nominated by: Initiative group	President of Human Ecology International Concern, 1996 candidate
Alexander Barkashov (46)	Nominated by: Initiative group Backed by: RNE	Deputy chairman of Slavic Martial Arts Center; Leader of the Russian National Unity
Galina Bozhedomova (53)	Nominated by: Initiative group	Union leader
Zukhra Bychkova-Zakirzyanova (42)	Nominated by: Initiative group	Entrepreneur
Aleksandr Demin (63)	Nominated by: Initiative group	Ataman of the Union of Cossack Formations
Yury Khramtsov (52)	Nominated by: Initiative group	Chairman of Sathya Sai Foundation, Saint Petersburg
German Khrustalev (35)	Nominated by: Initiative group	Assistant to the deputy of Moscow City Duma
Nikolay Kozlov (60)	Nominated by: Initiative group	Lawyer
Aleksandr Kuzin (43)	Nominated by: Initiative group	President of crisis management center
Andrey Lychakov (39)	Nominated by: Initiative group	Chairman of the Council, "Ozon" ecological center, 1996 candidate
Mikhail Mikhailov (44)	Nominated by: Initiative group	Locksmith
Valery Nemtse-Petrovsky (45)	Nominated by: Initiative group	Farmer
Anatoly Panfilov (49)	Nominated by: Initiative group Backed by: Kedr	Chairman of the Russian Ecological Party "Kedr"
Levon Sarvazyan (45)	Nominated by: Party of People's Capital	Chairman of the Party of People's Capital
Natalya Sigolayeva (36)	Nominated by: Initiative group	Economist
Sergey Skurikhin (44)	Nominated by: Initiative group	Unemployed
Yevgeny Tretyakov (45)	Nominated by: Initiative group	Lawyer
Galina Tsylina (51)	Nominated by: Initiative group	Unemployed
Lev Ubozhko (67)	Nominated by: Conservative Party	Chairman of the Conservative Party, perennial candidate

== Possible candidates who did not run ==
The following individuals were included in some polls, were referred to in the media as possible candidates or had publicly expressed interest long before the elections but never announced that they would run.

- Viktor Anpilov
- Dmitry Ayatskov
- Sergey Baburin
- Alexander Barkashov
- Vladimir Bryntsalov
- Viktor Chernomyrdin
- Anatoly Chubais
- Yegor Gaidar
- Mikhail Gorbachev
- Tatyana Dyachenko
- Boris Fyodorov
- Svyatoslav Fyodorov
- Viktor Ilyukhin
- Anatoly Kulikov
- Mikhail Lapshin
- Alexander Lebed
- Alexander Lukashenko
- Yury Luzhkov
- Albert Makashov
- Boris Nemtsov
- Andrei Nikolayev
- Yevgeny Primakov
- Alla Pugacheva
- Alexander Rutskoy
- Eduard Rossel
- Gennady Seleznyov
- Sergey Shoygu
- Martin Shakkum
- Yury Skokov
- Anatoly Sobchak (died 20 February 2000)
- Aleksandr Solzhenitsyn
- Sergei Stepashin
- Yegor Stroyev
- Sysoyev
- Nikolai Travkin
- Boris Yeltsin – constitutionally barred from running
