= Opinion polling for the 2000 Russian presidential election =

Opinion polling for the Russian presidential election, 2000

This page lists public opinion polls in connection with the 2000 Russian presidential election.

== First round ==
=== 1996–97 polls ===
View source data.

| Polling Firm/ Link | Fieldwork Date | | | | | | | | | | | | Other | Against all | Undecided | Lead |
| Polling Firm/ Link | Fieldwork Date | Yeltsin Ind. | Nemtsov Ind. | Zyuganov CPRF | Lebed KRO | Luzhkov Ind. | Yavlinsky Yabloko | Zhirinovsky LDPR | Chernomyrdin NDR | Tuleyev CPRF | Chubais DVR | Fyodorov PST | Other | Against all | Undecided | Lead |
|---|---|---|---|---|---|---|---|---|---|---|---|---|---|---|---|---|
| 1996 election (1st round) | 16 June 1996 | 35.8 | —N/a | 32.5 | 14.7 | —N/a | 7.4 | 5.8 | —N/a | 0.0 | —N/a | 0.9 | 1.1 (Note: Mikhail Gorbachev (Ind.) 0.5%, Martin Shakkum (SNPR) 0.4%, Vladimir Bryntsalov (RSP) 0.2%) | 1.6 | —N/a | 3.3 |
| | 31 Aug 1996 | Alexander Lebed and Aslan Maskhadov sign the Khasavyurt Accord ending the First Chechen War | | | | | | | | | | | | | | |
| VCIOM | Sep 1996 | —N/a | 2 | 24 | 30 | 2 | 5 | 2 | 8 | —N/a | —N/a | —N/a | 27 | | —N/a | 6 |
| VCIOM | Dec 1996 | —N/a | 3 | 23 | 22 | 5 | 7 | 4 | 4 | —N/a | —N/a | —N/a | 32 | | —N/a | 1 |
| VCIOM | Jan 1997 | —N/a | 4 | 19 | 22 | 4 | 6 | 5 | 8 | —N/a | —N/a | —N/a | 32 | | —N/a | 3 |
| | Mar 1997 | Boris Nemtsov appointed first deputy prime minister in charge of economic reform | | | | | | | | | | | | | | |
| VCIOM | May 1997 | —N/a | 19 | 21 | 13 | 4 | 7 | 4 | 2 | —N/a | —N/a | —N/a | 30 | | —N/a | 2 |
| VCIOM | 30 Aug 1997 | 4 | 28 | 14 | 15 | 8 | 7 | 6 | 4 | 3 | 1 | 1 | 8 (Note: Yegor Gaidar (DVR) 1%, Mikhail Gorbachev (Ind.) 1%, Alexander Rutskoy (Derzhava) 1%) | —N/a | —N/a | 13 |
| FOM | 30 Aug 1997 | —N/a | 20 | 17 | 11 | 11 | 6 | 3 | 3 | —N/a | —N/a | —N/a | —N/a | 3 | 15 | 3 |
| VCIOM | Sep 1997 | 6 | 17 | 24 | 10 | 10 | 6 | 4 | 3 | —N/a | —N/a | —N/a | 24 | | —N/a | 7 |
| VCIOM | Oct 1997 | 7 | 13 | 24 | 7 | 9 | 8 | 4 | 2 | —N/a | —N/a | —N/a | 26 | | —N/a | 11 |
| VCIOM | 10 Oct 1997 | 4 | 15 | 14 | 10 | 9 | 7 | 4 | 3 | 1 | 2 | 2 | 2 (Note: Yegor Gaidar (DVR) 1%) | 11 | 15 | 1 |
| VCIOM | Nov 1997 | 9 | 11 | 21 | 9 | 6 | 8 | 3 | 4 | —N/a | —N/a | —N/a | 29 | | —N/a | 10 |
| | Nov 1997 | Corruption scandal involving Nemtsov and Chubais | | | | | | | | | | | | | | |
| VCIOM | Dec 1997 | 5 | 10 | 20 | 9 | 5 | 8 | 6 | 4 | —N/a | —N/a | —N/a | 22 | | —N/a | 10 |
| VCIOM | 30 Dec 1997 | 5 | 8 | 12 | 9 | 5 | 7 | 4 | 3 | 3 | 1 | 0 | 4 (Note: Alexander Lukashenko (Ind.) 1%, Alexander Rutskoy (Derzhava) 1%) | 14 | 22 | 3 |

=== 1998 polls ===
| Polling Firm/ Link | Fieldwork Date | | | | | | | | | | | Other | Against All | Undecided | Lead |
| Polling Firm/ Link | Fieldwork Date | Yeltsin Ind. | Nemtsov RosMol | Zyuganov CPRF | Lebed RNRP | Luzhkov Otechestvo | Yavlinsky Yabloko | Zhirinovsky LDPR | Chernomyrdin NDR | Primakov Ind. | Tuleyev CPRF | Other | Against All | Undecided | Lead |
|---|---|---|---|---|---|---|---|---|---|---|---|---|---|---|---|
| VCIOM | January | 2 | —N/a | 16 | 9 | 8 | 6 | 4 | 2 | —N/a | —N/a | 19 | 10 | 23 | 7 |
| VCIOM | 15 Jan | —N/a | 11 | 18 | 12 | 10 | 9 | 6 | 2 | —N/a | 4 | 4 | 12 | | 6 |
| VCIOM | February | 5 | —N/a | 15 | 8 | —N/a | 7 | 4 | 2 | —N/a | —N/a | 16 | 15 | 20 | 7 |
| VCIOM | 15 Feb | 6 | 9 | 13 | 8 | 9 | 8 | 4 | 2 | —N/a | 2 | 1 | 13 | —N/a | 4 |
| VCIOM | March | 3 | —N/a | 15 | 7 | 5 | 8 | 3 | 3 | —N/a | —N/a | 20 | 14 | 22 | 7 |
| VCIOM | 15 Mar | 4 | 10 | 15 | 7 | 5 | 8 | 3 | 4 | —N/a | 2 | 2 | 11 | —N/a | 5 |
| | 23 Mar | Sergey Kiriyenko appointed prime minister | | | | | | | | | | | | | |
| | 28 Mar | Viktor Chernomyrdin announces his candidacy | | | | | | | | | | | | | |
| VCIOM | May | 5 | —N/a | 18 | 11 | 8 | 9 | 3 | 4 | —N/a | —N/a | 8 | 14 | 16 | 7 |
| FOM | 10 May | 4 | 6 | 20 | 10 | 11 | 10 | 5 | 5 | —N/a | —N/a | —N/a | —N/a | —N/a | 9 |
| VCIOM | 15 May | —N/a | 4 | 16 | 11 | 8 | 10 | 3 | 4 | —N/a | —N/a | 2 | 13 | 16 | 5 |
| | 17 May | Alexander Lebed elected governor of Krasnoyarsk Krai | | | | | | | | | | | | | |
| VCIOM | June | 5 | —N/a | 14 | 7 | 7 | 8 | 3 | 4 | —N/a | —N/a | 11 | 17 | 23 | 6 |
| VCIOM | 15 Jun | 1 | 4 | 13 | 8 | 7 | 8 | 3 | 5 | —N/a | 2 | 2 | 15 | —N/a | 5 |
| VCIOM | July | 2 | —N/a | 15 | 10 | 6 | 6 | 4 | 2 | —N/a | —N/a | 9 | 17 | 26 | 5 |
| VCIOM | 15 Jul | 2 | 2 | 13 | 11 | 6 | 6 | 3 | 3 | —N/a | 1 | 2 | 15 | —N/a | 2 |
| VCIOM | August | 2 | —N/a | 18 | 12 | 4 | 5 | 5 | 3 | —N/a | —N/a | 11 | 14 | 23 | 6 |
| VCIOM | 15 Aug | 1 | 1 | 13 | 8 | 6 | 6 | 4 | 1 | 3 | 1 | 1 | 24 | | 5 |
| | 17 Aug | 1998 Russian financial crisis | | | | | | | | | | | | | |
| VCIOM | September | 1 | —N/a | 16 | 8 | 5 | 6 | 4 | 2 | 2 | —N/a | —N/a | —N/a | 22 | 8 |
| | 11 Sep | Yevgeny Primakov appointed prime minister as a compromise candidate between Yeltsin administration and State Duma's opposition majority | | | | | | | | | | | | | |
| VCIOM | October | 0 | —N/a | 12 | 7 | 10 | 8 | 3 | 2 | 4 | —N/a | 7 | 12 | 32 | 2 |
| FOM | 10 Oct | —N/a | —N/a | 17 | 13 | 16 | 9 | —N/a | —N/a | 9 | —N/a | —N/a | —N/a | —N/a | 1 |
| VCIOM | 15 Oct | 1 | 1 | 11 | 7 | 10 | 9 | 3 | 2 | 5 | 1 | 3 | —N/a | —N/a | 1 |
| FOM | 17 Oct | —N/a | —N/a | 19 | 11 | 16 | 7 | —N/a | —N/a | 11 | —N/a | —N/a | —N/a | —N/a | 3 |
| FOM | 24 Oct | —N/a | —N/a | 18 | 11 | 11 | 9 | —N/a | —N/a | 13 | —N/a | —N/a | —N/a | —N/a | 5 |
| VCIOM | 30 Oct | 1 | 1 | 12 | 9 | 12 | 8 | 3 | 1 | 8 | 2 | 1 | —N/a | —N/a | Tie |
| VCIOM | 30 Oct | —N/a | —N/a | 17 | 13 | 20 | 17 | 4 | 2 | 14 | —N/a | —N/a | —N/a | —N/a | 3 |
| FOM | 31 Oct | —N/a | —N/a | 18 | 12 | 13 | 10 | —N/a | —N/a | 15 | —N/a | —N/a | —N/a | —N/a | 3 |
| VCIOM | November | 1 | —N/a | 14 | 9 | 11 | 6 | 3 | 1 | 7 | —N/a | 7 | 13 | 26 | 3 |
| | 5 Nov | Constitutional Court rules Yeltsin ineligible for a third consecutive term | | | | | | | | | | | | | |
| FOM | 11 Nov | —N/a | —N/a | 18 | 9 | 13 | 10 | 4 | 2 | 15 | —N/a | 8 (Note: Seleznyov 1%, not voting 7%.) | 6 | 13 | 3 |
| VCIOM | 15 Nov | —N/a | 2 | 21 | 8 | 18 | 13 | 5 | 2 | 13 | —N/a | 5 | —N/a | —N/a | 3 |
| VCIOM | 15 Nov | —N/a | 3 | 21 | 10 | 17 | 13 | 5 | 2 | 13 | —N/a | 2 | —N/a | —N/a | 4 |
| | 20 Nov | Assassination of Galina Starovoytova | | | | | | | | | | | | | |
| VCIOM | December | —N/a | —N/a | 17 | —N/a | 12 | 8 | 4 | 1 | 10 | —N/a | 6 | 8 | 27 | 5 |

=== 1999 polls ===
View source data.

| Polling Firm | Fieldwork Date | | | | | | | | | | | | | | Other | Against All | Undecided | Wouldn't vote | Additional candidates |
| Polling Firm | Fieldwork Date | Putin Ind. | Nemtsov SPS | Zyuganov CPRF | Lebed RNRP | Luzhkov OVR | Yavlinsky Yabloko | Zhirinovsky LDPR | Chernomyrdin NDR | Primakov OVR | Kiriyenko SPS | Stepashin Ind. | Shoigu Ind. | Seleznyov CPRF | Other | Against All | Undecided | Wouldn't vote | Additional candidates |
|---|---|---|---|---|---|---|---|---|---|---|---|---|---|---|---|---|---|---|---|
| VCIOM | 15 Feb | —N/a | 3 | 20 | 8 | 16 | 12 | 5 | 1 | 16 | 4 | —N/a | —N/a | 2 | 5 | —N/a | —N/a | 11 | —N/a |
| VCIOM | 15 Feb | —N/a | 3 | 19 | 9 | 17 | 12 | 4 | 1 | 16 | 4 | —N/a | —N/a | 2 | 2 | —N/a | —N/a | 10 | —N/a |
| VCIOM | 15 Feb | —N/a | 2 | 16 | 10 | 15 | 11 | 4 | 1 | 16 | 4 | —N/a | —N/a | 3 | 2 | —N/a | —N/a | 6 | Lukashenko 4, Makashov 0 |
| VCIOM | 19–22 Feb | —N/a | —N/a | 17 | 5 | 13 | 9 | 3 | 0 | 10 | 2 | —N/a | —N/a | —N/a | 7 | 9 | 25 | —N/a | —N/a |
| VCIOM | 28 Feb | —N/a | 2 | 21 | 7 | 19 | 14 | 5 | 1 | 20 | 3 | —N/a | —N/a | 1 | 1 | —N/a | —N/a | 7 | —N/a |
| VCIOM | March | —N/a | —N/a | 17 | 6 | 13 | 10 | 3 | 1 | 15 | 3 | —N/a | —N/a | —N/a | 3 | 10 | 20 | —N/a | —N/a |
| VCIOM | 15 Mar | —N/a | 2 | 21 | 6 | 13 | 11 | 6 | 1 | 15 | 3 | —N/a | —N/a | 1 | 1 | —N/a | —N/a | 13 | (Note: S. Fyodorov, Gaidar, Lukashenko, Ryzhkov, Tuleyev 1%, Ayatskov, Barkashov, Bryntsalov, Chubais, B. Fyodorov, Kulikov, Nikolayev, Rutskoy, Stroyev, Yeltsin 0%) |
| VCIOM | 15 Mar | —N/a | 2 | 21 | 7 | 16 | 12 | 6 | 1 | 18 | 4 | —N/a | —N/a | 2 | 1 | —N/a | —N/a | 9 | —N/a |
| VCIOM | 30 Mar | —N/a | 1 | 20 | 6 | 18 | 11 | 7 | 2 | 17 | 3 | 3 | —N/a | 1 | 2 | —N/a | —N/a | 8 | —N/a |
| VCIOM | April | —N/a | —N/a | 19 | 6 | 13 | 11 | 6 | 1 | 15 | 4 | 2 | —N/a | —N/a | 5 | 11 | 10 | —N/a | —N/a |
| | 3 Apr | Prosecutor general Yury Skuratov suspended from office amid a sex scandal | | | | | | | | | | | | | | | | | |
| VCIOM | 15 Apr | —N/a | 2 | 21 | 6 | 16 | 11 | 6 | 2 | 14 | 4 | 6 | —N/a | 1 | 1 | —N/a | —N/a | 9 | Pamfilova 1 |
| VCIOM | 30 Apr | —N/a | 2 | 20 | 5 | 16 | 10 | 5 | 2 | 15 | 4 | 7 | —N/a | 1 | 2 | —N/a | —N/a | 9 | (Note: Pamfilova 2%, Barkashov 1%, Aksyonenko, Bryntsalov 0%) |
| VCIOM | May | —N/a | —N/a | 19 | 5 | 13 | 7 | 6 | 1 | 15 | 4 | —N/a | —N/a | —N/a | 3 | 12 | 16 | —N/a | —N/a |
| | 12 May | Sergey Stepashin appointed prime minister, replacing Primakov | | | | | | | | | | | | | | | | | |
| | 15 May | Impeachment attempt of Boris Yeltsin fails in the State Duma | | | | | | | | | | | | | | | | | |
| VCIOM | June | —N/a | —N/a | 24 | 7 | 15 | 12 | 6 | 2 | 14 | 4 | 5 | —N/a | —N/a | —N/a | —N/a | —N/a | —N/a | —N/a |
| FOM | June | —N/a | —N/a | 17 | 6 | 13 | 9 | 6 | 2 | 17 | —N/a | 7 | —N/a | —N/a | —N/a | —N/a | —N/a | —N/a | —N/a |
| VCIOM | 15 Jun | 25 | 1 | 15 | 3 | 8 | 7 | 3 | 1 | 18 | 3 | 2 | 3 | 1 | 1 | —N/a | —N/a | 3 | Aksyonenko, Matviyenko; 0 |
| VCIOM | 18−22 Jun | —N/a | —N/a | 16 | 6 | 14 | 8 | 6 | 1 | 11 | 3 | 4 | —N/a | —N/a | 6 | 12 | 13 | —N/a | —N/a |
| VCIOM | 30 Jun | 33 | 1 | 18 | 2 | 4 | 7 | 4 | 0 | 15 | 2 | 2 | 2 | 2 | 3 | —N/a | —N/a | 5 | —N/a |
| VCIOM | 30 Jun | 32 | 1 | 18 | 1 | 3 | 5 | 4 | 0 | 14 | 2 | —N/a | —N/a | 1 | 1 | 3 | —N/a | 7 | Pamfilova 3 |
| FOM | July | —N/a | —N/a | 16 | —N/a | —N/a | 9 | 6 | —N/a | —N/a | —N/a | —N/a | —N/a | —N/a | —N/a | 6 | 10 | 8 | —N/a |
| VCIOM | 15 Jul | 37 | 1 | 18 | 4 | 5 | 5 | 3 | 0 | 12 | 2 | 2 | 3 | 0 | 1 | 2 | —N/a | 5 | —N/a |
| VCIOM | 15 Jul | 39 | 1 | 19 | 3 | 4 | 6 | 3 | 0 | 11 | 2 | 1 | 4 | 0 | 0 | 2 | —N/a | 4 | —N/a |
| VCIOM | 23−28 Jul | —N/a | —N/a | 18 | 4 | 13 | 7 | 4 | 2 | 13 | 3 | 6 | —N/a | —N/a | 6 | 10 | 15 | —N/a | —N/a |
| VCIOM | 30 Jul | 46 | 1 | 15 | 1 | 2 | 5 | 3 | 0 | 11 | 2 | 1 | 2 | 0 | 1 | 3 | —N/a | 6 | —N/a |
| VCIOM | 30 Jul | 49 | 1 | 16 | 1 | 2 | 5 | 3 | 0 | 10 | 2 | 1 | 1 | 1 | 1 | 2 | —N/a | 5 | —N/a |
| FOM | August | 2 | —N/a | 16 | —N/a | —N/a | 6 | 6 | —N/a | —N/a | —N/a | —N/a | —N/a | —N/a | —N/a | 6 | 11 | 6 | —N/a |
| | Aug–Sep | Invasion of Chechnya-based islamist militias into Dagestan | | | | | | | | | | | | | | | | | |
| | 9 Aug | Vladimir Putin replaces Stepashin as prime minister | | | | | | | | | | | | | | | | | |
| VCIOM | 15 Aug | 49 | 1 | 16 | 2 | 2 | 4 | 3 | 0 | 10 | 2 | 1 | 2 | 1 | 0 | 2 | —N/a | 5 | —N/a |
| VCIOM | 15 Aug | 51 | 1 | 17 | 2 | 2 | 5 | 3 | 0 | 7 | 2 | 0 | 2 | 1 | 1 | 2 | —N/a | 4 | —N/a |
| VCIOM | 18−21 Aug | 2 | —N/a | 19 | 4 | 8 | 7 | 7 | 2 | 15 | 3 | 5 | —N/a | —N/a | 4 | 12 | 11 | —N/a | —N/a |
| VCIOM | 20-24 Aug | 2 | 2 | 26 | 5 | 9 | 9 | 6 | 3 | 19 | 3 | 7 | —N/a | —N/a | —N/a | —N/a | —N/a | —N/a | Pamfilova 1 |
| FOM | 21-22 Aug | 1 | —N/a | 16 | 5 | 8 | 6 | 7 | 2 | 22 | —N/a | 11 | —N/a | —N/a | —N/a | —N/a | —N/a | —N/a | —N/a |
| VCIOM | 30 Aug | 48 | 1 | 15 | 1 | 2 | 7 | 3 | 0 | 9 | 2 | 1 | 3 | 1 | 1 | 3 | —N/a | 6 | —N/a |
| VCIOM | 30 Aug | 47 | 1 | 16 | 1 | 1 | 5 | 4 | 0 | 8 | 3 | 1 | 4 | 0 | 1 | 2 | —N/a | 6 | —N/a |
| FOM | September | 14 | —N/a | 16 | —N/a | —N/a | 7 | 5 | —N/a | —N/a | —N/a | —N/a | —N/a | —N/a | —N/a | 5 | 10 | 7 | —N/a |
| VCIOM | 15 Sep | 47 | 1 | 16 | 1 | 2 | 5 | 4 | 0 | 8 | 2 | 1 | 2 | 1 | 1 | 3 | —N/a | 5 | —N/a |
| VCIOM | 15 Sep | 48 | 2 | 17 | 1 | 2 | 5 | 3 | 0 | 7 | 2 | 1 | 2 | 0 | 1 | 3 | —N/a | 6 | —N/a |
| | 4–16 Sep | Russian apartment bombings | | | | | | | | | | | | | | | | | |
| VCIOM | 17–21 Sep | 4–7 | —N/a | 17–27 | 4–5 | 10 | 7–9 | 3–5 | 1 | 19–22 | —N/a | 3–6 | —N/a | —N/a | —N/a | —N/a | —N/a | —N/a | —N/a |
| VCIOM | 17−21 Sep | 5 | —N/a | 19 | 4 | 8 | 6 | 3 | 1 | 16 | 2 | 3 | —N/a | —N/a | 3 | 16 | 14 | —N/a | —N/a |
| FOM | 18–19 Sep | 1–2 | —N/a | 16–26 | 5 | 8–9 | 6–9 | 6–7 | 2–3 | 19–22 | —N/a | 7–11 | —N/a | —N/a | —N/a | —N/a | —N/a | —N/a | —N/a |
| VCIOM | 30 Sep | 51 | 1 | 14 | 1 | 2 | 4 | 4 | 0 | 9 | 2 | 1 | 2 | 0 | 1 | 4 | —N/a | 4 | —N/a |
| VCIOM | 30 Sep | 53 | 1 | 15 | 0 | 2 | 4 | 3 | 0 | 7 | 2 | 1 | 3 | 1 | 2 | 2 | —N/a | 5 | —N/a |
| FOM | October | 21 | —N/a | 16 | —N/a | —N/a | 6 | 5 | —N/a | —N/a | —N/a | —N/a | —N/a | —N/a | —N/a | 5 | 10 | 6 | —N/a |
| VCIOM | October | 22 | —N/a | 16 | 2 | 5 | 5 | 3 | 0 | 13 | 2 | 2 | —N/a | —N/a | 6 | 12 | 13 | —N/a | —N/a |
| VCIOM | 15–18 Oct | 19 | —N/a | 15 | —N/a | —N/a | 5 | 3 | —N/a | —N/a | —N/a | —N/a | —N/a | —N/a | —N/a | —N/a | 13 | —N/a | —N/a |
| VCIOM | 15–19 Oct | 21–26 | —N/a | 16–20 | 3 | 5–8 | 7 | 3–4 | —N/a | 14–16 | —N/a | 3–6 | 2–3 | —N/a | —N/a | —N/a | —N/a | —N/a | —N/a |
| VCIOM | 29 Oct–1 Nov | 25 | —N/a | 17 | —N/a | —N/a | 6 | 3 | —N/a | —N/a | —N/a | —N/a | —N/a | —N/a | —N/a | —N/a | 13 | —N/a | —N/a |
| FOM | November | 40 | —N/a | 16 | —N/a | —N/a | 5 | 3 | —N/a | —N/a | —N/a | —N/a | —N/a | —N/a | —N/a | 3 | 9 | 5 | —N/a |
| VCIOM | November | 22 | —N/a | 14 | 1 | 2 | 4 | 3 | 0 | 7 | 2 | 1 | —N/a | —N/a | 4 | 12 | 13 | —N/a | —N/a |
| VCIOM | 10–13 Dec | 30 | —N/a | 15 | —N/a | —N/a | 4 | 4 | —N/a | —N/a | —N/a | —N/a | —N/a | —N/a | —N/a | —N/a | 14 | —N/a | —N/a |
| VCIOM | 12–15 Dec | 35 | —N/a | 14 | —N/a | —N/a | 2 | 4 | —N/a | —N/a | —N/a | —N/a | —N/a | —N/a | —N/a | —N/a | 15 | —N/a | —N/a |
| VCIOM | 15 Nov | 53 | 1 | 13 | 1 | 2 | 4 | 3 | 0 | 9 | 2 | 1 | 4 | 1 | 0 | 3 | —N/a | 4 | —N/a |
| VCIOM | 15 Nov | 54 | 1 | 12 | 1 | 2 | 4 | 2 | 0 | 9 | 3 | 1 | 3 | 1 | 2 | 2 | —N/a | 4 | —N/a |
| VCIOM | 26–29 Nov | 45 | —N/a | 17 | 7 | 2 | 5 | 3 | —N/a | 9 | —N/a | —N/a | 4 | —N/a | —N/a | —N/a | —N/a | —N/a | —N/a |
| VCIOM | 26–29 Nov | 36 | —N/a | 14 | —N/a | —N/a | 4 | 3 | —N/a | —N/a | —N/a | —N/a | —N/a | —N/a | —N/a | —N/a | 13 | —N/a | —N/a |
| FOM | December | 45 | —N/a | 15 | —N/a | —N/a | 5 | 5 | —N/a | —N/a | —N/a | —N/a | —N/a | —N/a | —N/a | 5 | 7 | 4 | —N/a |
| VCIOM | December | 40 | —N/a | 13 | 0 | 0 | 3 | 3 | —N/a | 6 | 1 | 0 | —N/a | —N/a | 4 | 12 | 12 | —N/a | —N/a |
| VCIOM | 3–6 Dec | 36 | —N/a | 14 | —N/a | —N/a | 5 | 4 | —N/a | —N/a | —N/a | —N/a | —N/a | —N/a | —N/a | —N/a | 15 | —N/a | —N/a |
| FOM | 8 Dec | 45 | —N/a | 17 | —N/a | 3 | 5 | 4 | —N/a | 7 | —N/a | —N/a | —N/a | —N/a | 4 | 7 | 4 | —N/a | —N/a |
| VCIOM | 10–13 Dec | 41 | —N/a | 14 | —N/a | —N/a | 3 | 3 | —N/a | —N/a | —N/a | —N/a | —N/a | —N/a | —N/a | —N/a | 12 | —N/a | —N/a |
| | 19 Dec | 1999 Russian legislative election | | | | | | | | | | | | | | | | | |
| VCIOM | 17–20 Dec | 51 | —N/a | 19 | 2 | 2 | 5 | 4 | —N/a | 9 | —N/a | —N/a | 2 | —N/a | —N/a | —N/a | —N/a | —N/a | —N/a |
| VCIOM | 17–20 Dec | 41 | —N/a | 12 | —N/a | —N/a | 3 | 3 | —N/a | —N/a | —N/a | —N/a | —N/a | —N/a | —N/a | —N/a | 14 | —N/a | —N/a |
| VCIOM | 24–27 Dec | 42 | —N/a | 14 | —N/a | —N/a | 3 | 5 | —N/a | —N/a | —N/a | —N/a | —N/a | —N/a | —N/a | —N/a | 9 | —N/a | —N/a |
| VCIOM | 30 Dec | 51 | 1 | 16 | 1 | 1 | 3 | 4 | 0 | 9 | 3 | 1 | 3 | 1 | 1 | 3 | —N/a | 5 | —N/a |
| VCIOM | 30 Dec | 53 | 0 | 16 | 1 | 1 | 2 | 3 | 0 | 8 | 3 | 1 | 2 | 1 | 1 | 2 | —N/a | 4 | —N/a |
| | 31 Dec | President Yeltsin resigns, triggering a snap presidential election | | | | | | | | | | | | | | | | | |

=== 2000 polls ===
| Polling Firm | Fieldwork Date | | | | | | | | | Other | Against All | Undecided | Wouldn't vote | Additional candidates |
| Polling Firm | Fieldwork Date | Putin Ind. | Zyuganov CPRF | Yavlinsky Yabloko | Zhirinovsky LDPR | Primakov OVR | Pamfilova ZGD | Tuleyev Ind. | Titov Ind./SPS | Other | Against All | Undecided | Wouldn't vote | Additional candidates |
|---|---|---|---|---|---|---|---|---|---|---|---|---|---|---|
| VCIOM | 8 Dec 1999 – 4 Jan 2000 | 48 | 11 | 3 | 2 | —N/a | —N/a | —N/a | —N/a | —N/a | 3 | 12 | 6 | —N/a |
| FOM | January | 54 | 14 | 4 | 4 | —N/a | —N/a | 1 | 1 | —N/a | 4 | 7 | 4 | —N/a |
| VCIOM | 8–10 Jan | 48 | 15 | 2 | 3 | —N/a | —N/a | —N/a | —N/a | —N/a | 3 | 10 | 8 | —N/a |
| | 13 Jan | Acting president Vladimir Putin launches his campaign | | | | | | | | | | | | |
| VCIOM | 14–17 Jan | 62 | 15 | 2 | 2 | —N/a | —N/a | —N/a | —N/a | 9 | 1 | 7 | —N/a | —N/a |
| VCIOM | 14–17 Jan | 58 | 16 | 4 | 3 | —N/a | —N/a | —N/a | —N/a | 7 | 2 | 8 | —N/a | —N/a |
| VCIOM | 14–17 Jan | 55 | 13 | 3 | 3 | —N/a | —N/a | 2 | —N/a | —N/a | 2 | 12 | 3 | —N/a |
| VCIOM | 21–24 Jan | 49 | 12 | 3 | 3 | —N/a | —N/a | 1 | —N/a | —N/a | 4 | 13 | 8 | —N/a |
| VCIOM | 28–31 Jan | 49 | 13 | 2 | 3 | —N/a | —N/a | 1 | —N/a | —N/a | 3 | 11 | 7 | —N/a |
| VCIOM | 28–31 Jan | 58 | 15 | 3 | 2 | 6 | —N/a | —N/a | —N/a | 7 | 1 | 9 | —N/a | —N/a |
| VCIOM | 30 Jan | 59 | 16 | 2 | 3 | 8 | —N/a | —N/a | —N/a | 1 | 2 | —N/a | 4 | (Note: Kiriyenko, Lebed, Luzhkov, Shoigu, Seleznyov 1%, Chernomyrdin, Nemtsov, Stepashin 0%) |
| VCIOM | 30 Jan | 56 | 14 | 2 | 2 | 6 | —N/a | 0 | —N/a | 0 | —N/a | 8 | 4 | (Note: Kiriyenko 2%, Ayatskov, Luzhkov, Shoigu, Seleznyov, Stepashin 1%, Anpilov, Barkashov, Chernomyrdin, Chubais, S. Fyodorov, Gaidar, Ilyukhin, Lapshin, Lebed, Lukashenko, Makashov, Nemtsov, Stroyev 0%) |
| VCIOM | 30 Jan | 62 | 16 | 2 | 2 | 7 | —N/a | —N/a | —N/a | 1 | 2 | —N/a | 4 | |
| VCIOM | February | 50 | 15 | 3 | —N/a | —N/a | —N/a | 2 | —N/a | —N/a | 5 | 10 | 9 | —N/a |
| FOM | 2–3 Feb | 53 | 15 | 4 | 3 | —N/a | —N/a | 2 | 1 | —N/a | 3 | 8 | 5 | —N/a |
| VCIOM | 4–7 Feb | 57 | 17 | 4 | 2 | —N/a | —N/a | —N/a | —N/a | 5 | 3 | 7 | —N/a | —N/a |
| FOM | 5–6 Feb | 55 | 15 | 3 | 3 | —N/a | —N/a | 1 | 2 | —N/a | 3 | 7 | 5 | —N/a |
| FOM | 9–10 Feb | 57 | 18 | 5 | 3 | —N/a | —N/a | 2 | 1 | —N/a | 4 | 7 | 3 | —N/a |
| FOM | 12–13 Feb | 54 | 18 | 5 | 4 | —N/a | —N/a | 1 | 1 | —N/a | 4 | 9 | 4 | —N/a |
| VCIOM | 11–14 Feb | 59 | 19 | 4 | 3 | —N/a | <1 | 2 | 1 | 1 | 4 | 7 | —N/a | (Note: Govorukhin 1%, Dzhabrailov, Podberezkin, Skuratov <1%) |
| FOM | 16–17 Feb | 53 | 21 | 5 | 3 | —N/a | —N/a | 2 | 1 | —N/a | 4 | 7 | 4 | —N/a |
| | 17 Feb | Central Election Commission rejects Vladimir Zhirinovsky's candidacy (reinstated 6 March) | | | | | | | | | | | | |
| VCIOM | 18–21 Feb | 59 | 18 | 3 | 3 | —N/a | <1 | 3 | 1 | 3 | 2 | 8 | —N/a | |
| FOM | 19–20 Feb | 55 | 16 | 5 | 4 | —N/a | —N/a | 2 | 1 | —N/a | 3 | 9 | 6 | —N/a |
| FOM | 23–24 Feb | 53 | 16 | 4 | 4 | —N/a | 1 | 2 | 1 | 3 | 3 | 9 | 4 | —N/a |
| VCIOM | 25–28 Feb | 56 | 21 | 5 | 3 | —N/a | —N/a | 2 | 1 | 3 | 2 | 9 | —N/a | (Note: Govorukhin, Savostyanov 1%, Dzhabrailov, Podberezkin, Skuratov <1%) |
| FOM | 26–27 Feb | 54 | 19 | 6 | —N/a | —N/a | 1 | 2 | 1 | 1 | 4 | 10 | 3 | —N/a |
| FOM | 1–2 Mar | 54 | 18 | 4 | —N/a | —N/a | 1 | 2 | 1 | 1 | 3 | 10 | 5 | —N/a |
| VCIOM | 3–6 Mar | 59 | 22 | 4 | —N/a | —N/a | —N/a | 2 | —N/a | 0 | 3 | 6 | —N/a | —N/a |
| VCIOM | 3-6 Mar | 47 | 17 | 4 | 4 | —N/a | —N/a | 2 | —N/a | 6 | 9 | 9 | 5 | —N/a |
| FOM | 4–5 Mar | 54 | 19 | 4 | —N/a | —N/a | 1 | 2 | 1 | 2 | 4 | 10 | 5 | —N/a |
| FOM | 9–10 Mar | 46 | 20 | 5 | 5 | —N/a | 1 | 2 | 2 | 3 | 3 | 9 | 4 | —N/a |
| VCIOM | 10–13 Mar | 58 | 21 | 5 | 3 | —N/a | —N/a | 2 | —N/a | 1 | 2 | 6 | —N/a | —N/a |
| FOM | 11–12 Mar | 48 | 19 | 4 | 4 | —N/a | 1 | 3 | 2 | 2 | 4 | 10 | 4 | —N/a |
| FOM | 15–16 Mar | 48 | 20 | 5 | 4 | —N/a | 1 | 3 | 3 | 1 | 3 | 10 | 4 | —N/a |
| FOM | 18–19 Mar | 44 | 20 | 5 | 4 | —N/a | 1 | 4 | 2 | 1 | 3 | 12 | 5 | —N/a |
| FOM | 22–23 Mar | 46 | 20 | 5 | 3 | —N/a | 1 | 3 | 2 | 1 | 2 | 12 | 5 | —N/a |
| Result | 26 Mar | 53.4 | 29.5 | 5.9 | 2.7 | —N/a | 1.0 | 3.0 | 1.5 | —N/a | 1.9 | —N/a | —N/a | 1.1 (Note: Govorukhin 0.4%, Dzhabrailov 0.1%, Podberezkin 0.1%, Skuratov 0.4%) |

== Hypothetical second round polls ==
=== With Chernomyrdin ===
| Date | Agency | Chernomyrdin | Luzhkov | Ryzhkov | Yavlinsky | Zyuganov | Against all | Wouldn't vote |
|---|---|---|---|---|---|---|---|---|
| 18 January 1997 | FOM | 19 | 44 | —N/a | —N/a | —N/a | —N/a | —N/a |
| 18 January 1997 | FOM | 30 | —N/a | —N/a | —N/a | 37 | —N/a | —N/a |
| 15 February 1998 | VCIOM | 26 | —N/a | —N/a | —N/a | 29 | 30 | 14 |
| 15 August 1998 | FOM | 14 | —N/a | —N/a | 26 | —N/a | —N/a | —N/a |
| 12 September 1998 | FOM | 14 | —N/a | —N/a | 26 | —N/a | —N/a | —N/a |
| 15 June 1999 | VCIOM | 12 | —N/a | 19 | —N/a | —N/a | 69 | —N/a |

=== With Kiriyenko ===
| Date | Agency | Kiriyenko | Putin | Yavlinsky | Against all |
|---|---|---|---|---|---|
| 15 June 1999 | VCIOM | 11 | 66 | —N/a | 23 |
| 15 June 1999 | VCIOM | 19 | —N/a | 29 | 52 |

=== With Lebed ===
| Date | Agency | Lebed | Primakov | Putin | Zyuganov | Nemtsov | Yavlinsky | Against all | Wouldn't vote |
|---|---|---|---|---|---|---|---|---|---|
| 18 January 1997 | FOM | 46 | —N/a | —N/a | 30 | —N/a | —N/a | —N/a | —N/a |
| 5 April 1997 | FOM | 25 | —N/a | —N/a | —N/a | 52 | —N/a | —N/a | —N/a |
| 15 February 1998 | VCIOM | 37 | —N/a | —N/a | 24 | —N/a | —N/a | 26 | 13 |
| 15 August 1998 | FOM | 32 | —N/a | —N/a | —N/a | —N/a | 20 | —N/a | —N/a |
| 12 September 1998 | FOM | 33 | —N/a | —N/a | —N/a | —N/a | 30 | —N/a | —N/a |
| 7 November 1998 | FOM | 23 | 45 | —N/a | —N/a | —N/a | —N/a | —N/a | —N/a |
| 15 June 1999 | VCIOM | 12 | —N/a | 66 | —N/a | —N/a | —N/a | 22 | —N/a |
| 15 August 1999 | VCIOM | 6 | —N/a | 80 | —N/a | —N/a | —N/a | —N/a | 5 |

=== With Luzhkov ===
| Date | Agency | Luzhkov | Chernomyrdin | Nemtsov | Primakov | Putin | Stepashin | Shoigu | Yavlinsky | Zyuganov | Against all | Wouldn't vote |
|---|---|---|---|---|---|---|---|---|---|---|---|---|
| 18 January 1997 | FOM | 44 | 19 | —N/a | —N/a | —N/a | —N/a | —N/a | —N/a | —N/a | —N/a | —N/a |
| 18 January 1997 | FOM | 42 | —N/a | —N/a | —N/a | —N/a | —N/a | —N/a | —N/a | 31 | —N/a | —N/a |
| 5 April 1997 | FOM | 24 | —N/a | 47 | —N/a | —N/a | —N/a | —N/a | —N/a | —N/a | —N/a | —N/a |
| 15 February 1998 | VCIOM | 46 | —N/a | —N/a | —N/a | —N/a | —N/a | —N/a | —N/a | 24 | 18 | 11 |
| 15 August 1998 | FOM | 34 | —N/a | —N/a | —N/a | —N/a | —N/a | —N/a | 18 | —N/a | —N/a | —N/a |
| 12 September 1998 | FOM | 34 | —N/a | —N/a | —N/a | —N/a | —N/a | —N/a | 28 | —N/a | —N/a | —N/a |
| 7 November 1998 | FOM | 25 | —N/a | —N/a | 40 | —N/a | —N/a | —N/a | —N/a | —N/a | —N/a | —N/a |
| 30 April 1999 | VCIOM | 32 | —N/a | —N/a | 49 | —N/a | 9 | —N/a | —N/a | —N/a | 10 | —N/a |
| 30 April 1999 | VCIOM | 43 | —N/a | —N/a | —N/a | —N/a | 31 | —N/a | —N/a | —N/a | 14 | 12 |
| 30 April 1999 | VCIOM | 45 | —N/a | —N/a | —N/a | —N/a | —N/a | —N/a | 28 | —N/a | 15 | 12 |
| 30 April 1999 | VCIOM | 45 | —N/a | —N/a | —N/a | —N/a | —N/a | —N/a | —N/a | 32 | 13 | 10 |
| 15 June 1999 | VCIOM | 18 | —N/a | —N/a | 59 | —N/a | —N/a | —N/a | —N/a | —N/a | 24 | —N/a |
| 15 June 1999 | VCIOM | 28 | —N/a | —N/a | —N/a | —N/a | 30 | —N/a | —N/a | —N/a | 42 | —N/a |
| 15 June 1999 | VCIOM | 31 | —N/a | —N/a | —N/a | —N/a | —N/a | 27 | —N/a | —N/a | 42 | —N/a |
| 15 June 1999 | VCIOM | 28 | —N/a | —N/a | —N/a | —N/a | —N/a | —N/a | 31 | —N/a | 41 | —N/a |
| 15 June 1999 | VCIOM | 10 | —N/a | —N/a | —N/a | 77 | —N/a | —N/a | —N/a | —N/a | 5 | —N/a |

=== With Nemtsov ===
| Date | Agency | Nemtsov | Zyuganov | Lebed | Luzhkov | Against all | Wouldn't vote |
|---|---|---|---|---|---|---|---|
| 5 April 1997 | FOM | 49 | 28 | —N/a | —N/a | —N/a | —N/a |
| 5 April 1997 | FOM | 52 | —N/a | 25 | —N/a | —N/a | —N/a |
| 5 April 1997 | FOM | 47 | —N/a | —N/a | 24 | —N/a | —N/a |
| 15 February 1998 | VCIOM | 38 | 28 | —N/a | —N/a | 22 | 12 |

=== With Primakov ===
| Date | Agency | Primakov | Lebed | Luzhkov | Putin | Stepashin | Yavlinsky | Zyuganov | Against all | Wouldn't Vote |
|---|---|---|---|---|---|---|---|---|---|---|
| 7 November 1998 | FOM | 45 | —N/a | 23 | —N/a | —N/a | —N/a | —N/a | —N/a | —N/a |
| 7 November 1998 | FOM | 40 | 25 | —N/a | —N/a | —N/a | —N/a | —N/a | —N/a | —N/a |
| 7 November 1998 | FOM | 45 | —N/a | —N/a | —N/a | —N/a | 20 | —N/a | —N/a | —N/a |
| 7 November 1998 | FOM | 43 | —N/a | —N/a | —N/a | —N/a | —N/a | 25 | —N/a | —N/a |
| 30 April 1999 | VCIOM | 49 | —N/a | 32 | —N/a | —N/a | —N/a | —N/a | 9 | 10 |
| 30 April 1999 | VCIOM | 54 | —N/a | —N/a | —N/a | 25 | —N/a | —N/a | 11 | 10 |
| 30 April 1999 | VCIOM | 56 | —N/a | —N/a | —N/a | —N/a | 23 | —N/a | 11 | 10 |
| 30 April 1999 | VCIOM | 55 | —N/a | —N/a | —N/a | —N/a | —N/a | 25 | 10 | 9 |
| 15 June 1999 | VCIOM | 59 | —N/a | 18 | —N/a | —N/a | —N/a | —N/a | 24 | —N/a |
| 15 August 1999 | VCIOM | 20 | —N/a | —N/a | 69 | —N/a | —N/a | —N/a | 7 | 4 |
| 15 August 1999 | VCIOM | 46 | —N/a | —N/a | —N/a | —N/a | 21 | —N/a | 25 | 8 |
| 15 August 1999 | VCIOM | 42 | —N/a | —N/a | —N/a | —N/a | —N/a | 26 | 26 | 10 |
| 30 January 2000 | VCIOM | 18 | —N/a | —N/a | 75 | —N/a | —N/a | —N/a | 4 | 3 |

=== With Putin ===
| Date | Agency | Putin | Kiriyenko | Lebed | Luzhkov | Primakov | Shoigu | Stepashin | Yavlinsky | Zhirinovsky | Zyuganov | Against all | Undecided | Wouldn't vote |
|---|---|---|---|---|---|---|---|---|---|---|---|---|---|---|
| 15 June 1999 | VCIOM | 66 | 11 | —N/a | —N/a | —N/a | —N/a | —N/a | —N/a | —N/a | —N/a | 23 | —N/a | —N/a |
| 15 June 1999 | VCIOM | 66 | —N/a | 12 | —N/a | —N/a | —N/a | —N/a | —N/a | —N/a | —N/a | 22 | —N/a | —N/a |
| 15 June 1999 | VCIOM | 64 | —N/a | —N/a | —N/a | —N/a | 12 | —N/a | —N/a | —N/a | —N/a | 24 | —N/a | —N/a |
| 15 August 1999 | VCIOM | 80 | —N/a | 6 | —N/a | —N/a | —N/a | —N/a | —N/a | —N/a | —N/a | —N/a | —N/a | 5 |
| 15 August 1999 | VCIOM | 77 | —N/a | —N/a | 10 | —N/a | —N/a | —N/a | —N/a | —N/a | —N/a | 5 | —N/a | —N/a |
| 15 August 1999 | VCIOM | 69 | —N/a | —N/a | —N/a | 20 | —N/a | —N/a | —N/a | —N/a | —N/a | 7 | —N/a | 4 |
| 15 August 1999 | VCIOM | 80 | —N/a | —N/a | —N/a | —N/a | —N/a | 6 | —N/a | —N/a | —N/a | 9 | —N/a | 5 |
| 15 August 1999 | VCIOM | 77 | —N/a | —N/a | —N/a | —N/a | —N/a | —N/a | 10 | —N/a | —N/a | 8 | —N/a | 5 |
| 15 August 1999 | VCIOM | 81 | —N/a | —N/a | —N/a | —N/a | —N/a | —N/a | —N/a | 5 | —N/a | 9 | —N/a | 5 |
| 15 August 1999 | VCIOM | 67 | —N/a | —N/a | —N/a | —N/a | —N/a | —N/a | —N/a | —N/a | 23 | 6 | —N/a | 4 |
| 30 January 2000 | VCIOM | 75 | —N/a | —N/a | —N/a | 18 | —N/a | —N/a | —N/a | —N/a | —N/a | 4 | —N/a | 3 |
| 30 January 2000 | VCIOM | 71 | —N/a | —N/a | —N/a | —N/a | —N/a | —N/a | —N/a | —N/a | 23 | 3 | —N/a | 3 |
| 11–14 February 2000 | VCIOM | 76 | —N/a | —N/a | —N/a | —N/a | —N/a | —N/a | 11 | —N/a | —N/a | 9 | 4 | —N/a |
| 11–14 February 2000 | VCIOM | 68 | —N/a | —N/a | —N/a | —N/a | —N/a | —N/a | —N/a | —N/a | 24 | 4 | 4 | —N/a |
| 10–13 March 2000 | VCIOM | 72 | —N/a | —N/a | —N/a | —N/a | —N/a | —N/a | 10 | —N/a | —N/a | 12 | 6 | —N/a |
| 10–13 March 2000 | VCIOM | 64 | —N/a | —N/a | —N/a | —N/a | —N/a | —N/a | —N/a | —N/a | 26 | 6 | 4 | —N/a |

=== With Ryzhkov ===
| Date | Agency | Ryzhkov | Chernomyrdin | Against all |
|---|---|---|---|---|
| 15 June 1999 | VCIOM | 19 | 12 | 69 |

=== With Shoigu ===
| Date | Agency | Shoigu | Luzhkov | Putin | Against all |
|---|---|---|---|---|---|
| 15 June 1999 | VCIOM | 27 | 31 | —N/a | 42 |
| 15 June 1999 | VCIOM | 12 | —N/a | 64 | 24 |

=== With Stepashin ===
| Date | Agency | Stepashin | Luzhkov | Primakov | Putin | Yavlinsky | Zyuganov | Against all | Wouldn't vote |
|---|---|---|---|---|---|---|---|---|---|
| 15 February 1998 | VCIOM | 44 | —N/a | —N/a | —N/a | —N/a | 32 | 15 | 10 |
| 15 April 1999 | VCIOM | 40 | —N/a | —N/a | —N/a | 29 | —N/a | 18 | 13 |
| 30 April 1999 | VCIOM | 31 | 43 | —N/a | —N/a | —N/a | —N/a | 14 | 12 |
| 30 April 1999 | VCIOM | 25 | —N/a | 54 | —N/a | —N/a | —N/a | 11 | 10 |
| 15 June 1999 | VCIOM | 30 | 28 | —N/a | —N/a | —N/a | —N/a | 42 | —N/a |
| 15 June 1999 | VCIOM | 26 | —N/a | —N/a | —N/a | 30 | —N/a | 43 | —N/a |
| 15 August 1999 | VCIOM | 6 | —N/a | —N/a | 80 | —N/a | —N/a | 9 | 5 |

=== With Yavlinsky ===
| Date | Agency | Yavlinsky | Cherno- myrdin | Kiriyenko | Lebed | Luzhkov | Putin | Primakov | Stepashin | Zyuganov | Against all | Undecided | Wouldn't vote |
|---|---|---|---|---|---|---|---|---|---|---|---|---|---|
| 15 February 1998 | VCIOM | 24 | —N/a | —N/a | —N/a | 46 | —N/a | —N/a | —N/a | —N/a | 18 | —N/a | 11 |
| 15 February 1998 | VCIOM | 35 | —N/a | —N/a | —N/a | —N/a | —N/a | —N/a | —N/a | 27 | 25 | —N/a | 13 |
| 15 August 1998 | FOM | 26 | 14 | —N/a | —N/a | —N/a | —N/a | —N/a | —N/a | —N/a | —N/a | —N/a | —N/a |
| 15 August 1998 | FOM | 20 | —N/a | —N/a | 32 | —N/a | —N/a | —N/a | —N/a | —N/a | —N/a | —N/a | —N/a |
| 15 August 1998 | FOM | 18 | —N/a | —N/a | —N/a | 34 | —N/a | —N/a | —N/a | —N/a | —N/a | —N/a | —N/a |
| 15 August 1998 | FOM | 21 | —N/a | —N/a | —N/a | —N/a | —N/a | —N/a | —N/a | 31 | —N/a | —N/a | —N/a |
| 12 September 1998 | FOM | 26 | 14 | —N/a | —N/a | —N/a | —N/a | —N/a | —N/a | —N/a | —N/a | —N/a | —N/a |
| 12 September 1998 | FOM | 30 | —N/a | —N/a | 33 | —N/a | —N/a | —N/a | —N/a | —N/a | —N/a | —N/a | —N/a |
| 12 September 1998 | FOM | 28 | —N/a | —N/a | —N/a | 34 | —N/a | —N/a | —N/a | —N/a | —N/a | —N/a | —N/a |
| 12 September 1998 | FOM | 30 | —N/a | —N/a | —N/a | —N/a | —N/a | —N/a | —N/a | 30 | —N/a | —N/a | —N/a |
| 7 November 1998 | FOM | 20 | —N/a | —N/a | —N/a | —N/a | —N/a | 45 | —N/a | —N/a | —N/a | —N/a | —N/a |
| 15 April 1999 | VCIOM | 29 | —N/a | —N/a | —N/a | —N/a | —N/a | —N/a | 40 | —N/a | 18 | —N/a | 13 |
| 30 April 1999 | VCIOM | 28 | —N/a | —N/a | —N/a | 45 | —N/a | —N/a | —N/a | —N/a | 15 | —N/a | 12 |
| 30 April 1999 | VCIOM | 23 | —N/a | —N/a | —N/a | —N/a | —N/a | 56 | —N/a | —N/a | 11 | —N/a | 10 |
| 30 April 1999 | VCIOM | 37 | —N/a | —N/a | —N/a | —N/a | —N/a | —N/a | —N/a | 34 | 18 | —N/a | 11 |
| 15 June 1999 | VCIOM | 29 | —N/a | 19 | —N/a | —N/a | —N/a | —N/a | —N/a | —N/a | 52 | —N/a | —N/a |
| 15 June 1999 | VCIOM | 31 | —N/a | —N/a | —N/a | 28 | —N/a | —N/a | —N/a | —N/a | 41 | —N/a | —N/a |
| 15 June 1999 | VCIOM | 10 | —N/a | —N/a | —N/a | —N/a | 77 | —N/a | —N/a | —N/a | 8 | —N/a | 5 |
| 15 June 1999 | VCIOM | 30 | —N/a | —N/a | —N/a | —N/a | —N/a | —N/a | 26 | —N/a | 43 | —N/a | —N/a |
| 15 August 1999 | VCIOM | 21 | —N/a | —N/a | —N/a | —N/a | —N/a | 46 | —N/a | —N/a | 25 | —N/a | 8 |
| 15 August 1999 | VCIOM | 35 | —N/a | —N/a | —N/a | —N/a | —N/a | —N/a | —N/a | 29 | 29 | —N/a | 7 |
| 11–14 February 2000 | VCIOM | 11 | —N/a | —N/a | —N/a | —N/a | 76 | —N/a | —N/a | —N/a | 9 | 4 | —N/a |
| 10–13 March 2000 | VCIOM | 10 | —N/a | —N/a | —N/a | —N/a | 72 | —N/a | —N/a | —N/a | 12 | 6 | —N/a |

=== With Zyuganov ===
| Date | Agency | Zyuganov | Cherno- myrdin | Lebed | Luzhkov | Nemtsov | Putin | Primakov | Stepashin | Yavlinsky | Yeltsin | Against all | Undecided | Wouldn't vote |
|---|---|---|---|---|---|---|---|---|---|---|---|---|---|---|
| 18 January 1997 | FOM | 37 | 30 | —N/a | —N/a | —N/a | —N/a | —N/a | —N/a | —N/a | —N/a | —N/a | —N/a | —N/a |
| 18 January 1997 | FOM | 30 | —N/a | 46 | —N/a | —N/a | —N/a | —N/a | —N/a | —N/a | —N/a | —N/a | —N/a | —N/a |
| 18 January 1997 | FOM | 31 | —N/a | —N/a | 42 | —N/a | —N/a | —N/a | —N/a | —N/a | —N/a | —N/a | —N/a | —N/a |
| 5 April 1997 | FOM | 28 | —N/a | —N/a | —N/a | 49 | —N/a | —N/a | —N/a | —N/a | —N/a | —N/a | —N/a | —N/a |
| 15 February 1998 | VCIOM | 28 | —N/a | —N/a | —N/a | 38 | —N/a | —N/a | —N/a | —N/a | —N/a | 22 | —N/a | 12 |
| 15 February 1998 | VCIOM | 32 | —N/a | —N/a | —N/a | —N/a | —N/a | —N/a | 44 | —N/a | —N/a | 15 | —N/a | 10 |
| 15 February 1998 | VCIOM | 27 | —N/a | —N/a | —N/a | —N/a | —N/a | —N/a | —N/a | 35 | —N/a | 25 | —N/a | 13 |
| 15 February 1998 | VCIOM | 29 | 26 | —N/a | —N/a | —N/a | —N/a | —N/a | —N/a | —N/a | —N/a | 30 | —N/a | 14 |
| 15 February 1998 | VCIOM | 24 | —N/a | 37 | —N/a | —N/a | —N/a | —N/a | —N/a | —N/a | —N/a | 26 | —N/a | 13 |
| 15 February 1998 | VCIOM | 24 | —N/a | —N/a | 46 | —N/a | —N/a | —N/a | —N/a | —N/a | —N/a | 18 | —N/a | 11 |
| 15 February 1998 | VCIOM | 26 | —N/a | —N/a | —N/a | —N/a | —N/a | —N/a | —N/a | —N/a | 27 | 27 | 13 | 8 |
| 15 August 1998 | FOM | 31 | —N/a | —N/a | —N/a | —N/a | —N/a | —N/a | —N/a | 21 | —N/a | —N/a | —N/a | —N/a |
| 12 September 1998 | FOM | 30 | —N/a | —N/a | —N/a | —N/a | —N/a | —N/a | —N/a | 30 | —N/a | —N/a | —N/a | —N/a |
| 7 November 1998 | FOM | 25 | —N/a | —N/a | —N/a | —N/a | —N/a | 43 | —N/a | —N/a | —N/a | —N/a | —N/a | —N/a |
| 30 April 1999 | VCIOM | 32 | —N/a | —N/a | 45 | —N/a | —N/a | —N/a | —N/a | —N/a | —N/a | 13 | —N/a | 10 |
| 30 April 1999 | VCIOM | 25 | —N/a | —N/a | —N/a | —N/a | —N/a | 55 | —N/a | —N/a | —N/a | 10 | —N/a | 9 |
| 30 April 1999 | VCIOM | 34 | —N/a | —N/a | —N/a | —N/a | —N/a | —N/a | —N/a | 37 | —N/a | 18 | —N/a | 11 |
| 15 August 1999 | VCIOM | 23 | —N/a | —N/a | —N/a | —N/a | 67 | —N/a | —N/a | —N/a | —N/a | 6 | —N/a | 4 |
| 15 August 1999 | VCIOM | 26 | —N/a | —N/a | —N/a | —N/a | —N/a | 42 | —N/a | —N/a | —N/a | 26 | —N/a | 10 |
| 15 August 1999 | VCIOM | 29 | —N/a | —N/a | —N/a | —N/a | —N/a | —N/a | —N/a | 35 | —N/a | 29 | —N/a | 7 |
| 30 January 2000 | VCIOM | 23 | —N/a | —N/a | —N/a | —N/a | 71 | —N/a | —N/a | —N/a | —N/a | 3 | —N/a | 3 |
| 11–14 February 2000 | VCIOM | 24 | —N/a | —N/a | —N/a | —N/a | 68 | —N/a | —N/a | —N/a | —N/a | 4 | 4 | —N/a |
| 10–13 March 2000 | VCIOM | 26 | —N/a | —N/a | —N/a | —N/a | 64 | —N/a | —N/a | —N/a | —N/a | 6 | 4 | —N/a |

=== With Zhirinovsky ===
| Date | Agency | Zhirinovsky | Putin | Against All | Undecided |
|---|---|---|---|---|---|
| 15 August 1999 | VCIOM | 5 | 81 | 9 | 5 |

=== With Yeltsin ===
| Date | Agency | Yeltsin | Zyuganov | Against all | Wouldn't vote | Undecided |
|---|---|---|---|---|---|---|
| 15 February 1998 | VCIOM | 27 | 26 | 27 | 13 | 8 |

== Subnational polls ==
=== Moscow ===
| Date | Agency | Putin | Zyuganov | Luzhkov | Yavlinsky | Zhirinovsky | Primakov | Govorukhin | Against All | Undecided/ no reply | Wouldn't vote | Additional candidates |
|---|---|---|---|---|---|---|---|---|---|---|---|---|
| 25–26 September 1999 | VCIOM | 7 | 10 | 25 | 7 | 2 | 30 | —N/a | 2 | 8 | —N/a | 9 (Note: Stepashin 3%, Lebed 2%, other 4%.) |
| 18 January 2000 | FOM | 37 | 5 | —N/a | 3 | 1 | —N/a | —N/a | 4 | 32 | 7 | —N/a |
| 24 January 2000 | FOM | 34 | 5 | —N/a | 5 | 1 | —N/a | —N/a | 4 | 28 | 8 | —N/a |
| 31 January 2000 | FOM | 33 | 5 | —N/a | 4 | 0 | —N/a | —N/a | 4 | 36 | 8 | —N/a |
| 7 February 2000 | FOM | 34 | 6 | —N/a | 6 | 1 | —N/a | —N/a | 6 | 36 | 6 | —N/a |
| 14 February 2000 | FOM | 31 | 6 | —N/a | 6 | 1 | —N/a | —N/a | 6 | 37 | 9 | —N/a |
| 21 February 2000 | FOM | 36 | 6 | —N/a | 7 | 1 | —N/a | 0 | 5 | 33 | 6 | —N/a |
| 28 February 2000 | FOM | 35 | 7 | —N/a | 6 | 1 | —N/a | 0 | 6 | 36 | 5 | —N/a |
| 6 March 2000 | FOM | 35 | 7 | —N/a | 6 | 1 | —N/a | 1 | 8 | 33 | 7 | —N/a |
| 13 March 2000 | FOM | 34 | 8 | —N/a | 9 | 1 | —N/a | 0 | 7 | 34 | 5 | —N/a |
| 20 March 2000 | FOM | 33 | 7 | —N/a | 8 | 1 | —N/a | 0 | 5 | 36 | 7 | —N/a |
| 26 March 2000 | Result | 46.22 | 19.16 | —N/a | 18.57 | 1.60 | —N/a | 1.84 | 5.94 | —N/a | —N/a | 5.92 (Note: Pamfilova 1.83%, Tuleyev 1.61%, Skuratov 1.20%, Titov 0.97%, Podberezkin 0.20%, Dzhabrailov 0.11%.) |
