= Paul Tatum =

American businessman (1955–1996)

Paul Tatum

Paul Edward Tatum (April 2, 1955 – November 3, 1996) was an American expatriate businessman assassinated in a Moscow metro station close to his hotel.

== Early life ==
Tatum was born to Edward and Millie Tatum on April 2, 1955, in Edmond, Oklahoma. He had 2 sisters, was a Boy Scout, and attended Edmond Memorial High School, and Oklahoma State University.

== Career ==
Tatum joined a Chamber of Commerce agricultural delegation to Moscow in 1985. Tatum was operating a Hotel Joint Venture with a Chechen businessman named Umar Dzhabrailov; the venture included the international hotel Radisson. Tatum also founded the Americom Business Centre.

== Death ==
Tatum had numerous disputes with his hotel partner Umar Dzhabrailov, at one point taking out a full-page ad in a local Moscow newspaper alleging that Dzhabrailov was blackmailing Tatum and trying to force him out of the hotel joint venture. On April 7, 1995, Tatum was barred from entering the hotel by his estranged business partners in a battle for control of the business. A few weeks later he was gunned down and shot 11 times in the head and neck. Shortly after Tatum's death, Dzhabrailov and the Moscow city government quickly took over complete control of the hotel joint venture.

== Other Facts ==
During the attempted coup in Russia in the summer of 1991, Tatum had supplied president Boris Yeltsin's only link to the outside world by giving him satellite linkage from a government building in Moscow, which was surrounded by army units trying to overthrow his fledgling democratic government.

Carol Williams investigated the Tatum murder for the Los Angeles Times and after concluding it had likely been a contract killing, she got a call from someone who told her it was "unhealthy to pursue certain avenues of inquiry".

Tatum was interred in Kuntsevo Cemetery, Moscow.
