= Irina Khakamada =

Russian economist and politician (born 1955)

- Ирина Хакамада
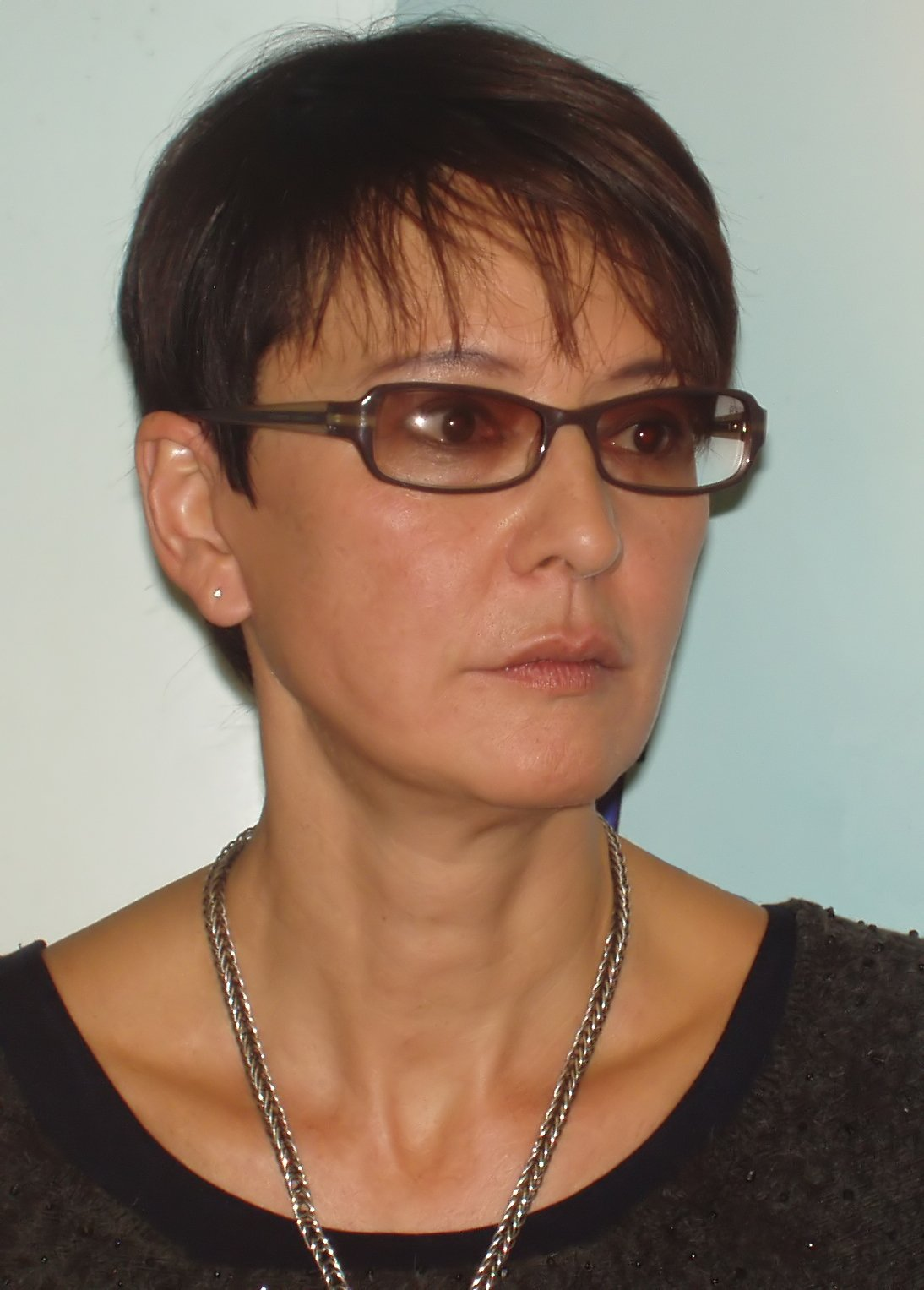
- Khakamada in 2008

Deputy Chairman of the State Duma
- In office 31 May 2000 – 29 December 2003

Member of the State Duma
- In office 12 December 1993 – 29 December 2003

Personal details
- Born: Irina Mutsuovna Khakamada; 13 April 1955 (age 71) Moscow, Russian SFSR, Soviet Union
- Party: Communist Party (1984–1989); Independent (1989–1992, 1994–1999 and 2008–2016); Party of Economic Freedom (1992–1994); Union of Right Forces (1999–2004); Our Choice (2004–2006); People's Democratic Union (2006–2008); Party of Growth (2016–present)
- Children: 2
- Education: RUDN University
- Website: www.hakamada.ru

Irina Mutsuovna Khakamada (Russian: Ири́на Муцу́овна Хакама́да, IPA: [ɪˈrʲinə mʊˈtsuəvnə xəkɐˈmadə]; born 13 April 1955) is a Russian economist, political activist, journalist, teacher, publicist, and politician who ran in the 2004 Russian presidential election.

Khakamada was a former member (deputy) of the lower house (the State Duma) of the Russian parliament for three convocations (electoral terms, 1993–2003) and vice-chair of the house; co-chair of a political party Union of Right Forces (1999–2003), presidential candidate of the Russian Federation (2004), member of the Presidential Council for the Development of Civil Society and Human Rights (2012–2018).

In 1995, Time named Khakamada a 21st-century politician among 100 well-known women in the world.

In 2002, Khakamada served as a rapporteur from Russia at the 57th session of the UN General Assembly. In 2005, she was nominated for the Nobel Peace Prize.

== Biography ==
Khakamada was born to a Japanese father, Mutsuo Hakamada, a Japanese communist who defected to the Soviet Union in 1939. Her mother, Nina Sinelnikova, with Russian, Lezgian and Armenian roots, was an English schoolteacher who lost her father to the Stalinist purges and her mother to suicide following the family's forced relocation to Khabarovsk.

Khakamada's paternal uncle is Satomi Hakamada (袴田 里見), a member of the Japanese Communist Party leadership. The Russia expert and political science professor Shigeki Hakamada is her half-brother.

In kanji, Khakamada's family name is 袴田; in katakana, her name is イリーナ・ハカマダ.

Khakamada graduated from the Department of Economy of the Patrice Lumumba Peoples' Friendship University in Moscow in 1978. She obtained her PhD degree from the Faculty of Economics of Lomonosov Moscow State University. In 1983, she received the academic title of associate professor in the specialty "political economy". She was a member of the CPSU from 1984 to 1989.

=== Duma career ===
Khakamada was an elected Duma representative from 1993 to 2003. She is regarded as a democratic politician who is in a moderate opposition to the Russian government. She is known for criticizing the governmental actions during Moscow theater hostage crisis where she was involved as one of the negotiators. Khakamada stated that the hostage takers were not going to use their bombs to kill the people and destroy the building.

Khakamada was a member of the coordinating council of the Union of Right Forces. She opted to abstain from the council's vote on their endorsement in the 2000 presidential election, in which the party ultimately voted to support Vladimir Putin's campaign over that of council member Konstantin Titov.

=== 2004 presidential campaign ===
Khakamada was one of the leaders of the Union of Rightist Forces when she decided to run in the 2004 Russian presidential election. She was not supported by her party, which had decided that they would not nominate a candidate. She announced her candidacy in December 2003.

Khakamada kicked off her campaign by delivering a speech which placed the blame for the Moscow theater hostage crisis at Putin's feet. She entered the election with better name recognition than most of the other candidates challenging Putin. Her candidacy was officially registered on 8 February. Khakamada was only the second woman to be a registered candidate in a Russian presidential election, after only Ella Pamfilova in 2000.

Khakamada claimed her motivation for running was her desire to see a liberal opposition candidate. She would ultimately be the only liberal opposition candidate to run.

In an article published in Novaya Gazeta, Yulia Latynina alleged that Khakamada only entered the election to feign a role of a democratic opponent to provide more legitimacy to the election of Vladimir Putin. Khakamada denied such allegations.

Khakamada's campaign slogan was “Irina Khakamada: Our Voice”. Her campaign received funding from Boris Nevzlin, a former Yukos chief who was being targeted for international investigation by Russian authorities and was residing in Israel during the campaign. She was outspoken about unfair conditions of the election, particularly about its media coverage. Early into the campaign, analysts predicted that she might be able to receive more than 10% of the vote. Khakamada received 3.9% of votes. While she declared that she found her performance in the election to have been, "satisfactory", she alleged that there had been many irregularities with the vote.

=== Subsequent political activities (2004– present) ===
After the election Khakamada founded a new political party named Our Choice. Since 2004, the chairman of the Party reorganized into the "Our Choice Interregional Public Fund for Social Solidarity", which in 2006 became part of the Russian People's Democratic Union (RNDS) political party, led by Mikhail Kasyanov and her.

Khakamada published the book "Gender in big-time politics" describing her personal experience of work in Kremlin.

On 11 June 2006 Boris Berezovsky, a fugitive from the Russian justice system, said Boris Nemtsov received word from Khakamada that Putin threatened her and like-minded colleagues in person. According to Berezovsky, Putin had issued threats that Khakamada and her colleagues "will take in the head immediately, literally, not figuratively" if they "open the mouth" about the Russian apartment bombings.

Former FSB officer Alexander Litvinenko said he had learned from Anna Politkovskaya that Putin asked Khakamada to pass a threat to Politkovskaya. Khakamada denied her involvement in passing any specific threats, and said that she warned Politkovskaya only in general terms more than a year earlier, and that Politkovskaya blamed her and Mikhail Kasyanov for becoming Kremlin's puppets. Politkovskaya and Litvinenko were murdered in October and November 2006.

2008, Khakamada left the party of her own accord, explaining the cessation of her political activities.

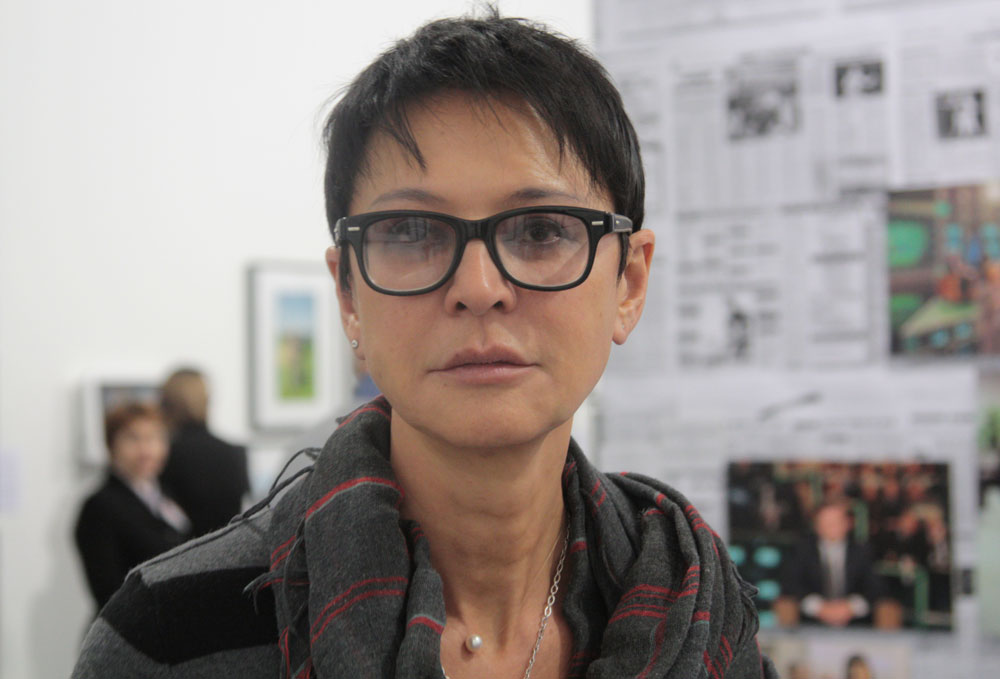
Khakamada in 2013

2016, she became a member of the Council of the Political Growth Party. She took part in the elections to the State Duma of the 7th convocation as a candidate from the “Party of Growth”, in the first part of the regional list of Moscow. The party won 1.28% of the vote and was unable to sit in parliament.

== Books ==
- 1995 - "Common cause" ("Общее дело")
- 1999 - "Maiden Name" ("Девичья фамилия")
- 2002 - “Peculiarities of National Politics” ("Особенности национального политика")
- 2006 - “Sex in big politics. Self-made woman's handbook" ("Sex в большой политике. Самоучитель self-made woman")
- 2007 - “Love, out of the game. The story of one political suicide" ("Любовь, вне игры. История одного политического самоубийства")
- 2008 - "Success in the big city" ("Success [успех] в Большом городе")
- 2012 - "The Tao of Life: A Master Class from a Staunch Individualist" ("Дао жизни: Мастер-класс от убежденного индивидуалиста")
- 2014 - “In anticipation of oneself: From image to style” ("В предвкушении себя: От имиджа к стилю")
- 2017 - "Success. You ask - I answer" ("Успех. Cпрашиваете– отвечаю")
- 2018 - "Restart: how to live many lives" ("Рестарт: Как прожить много жизней")

== Film and television ==
Khakamada has appeared in several films and television series as an actress, including Brief Guide To A Happy Life in 2012.
