= Yury Skuratov =

Russian jurist and politician

- Юрий Скуратов
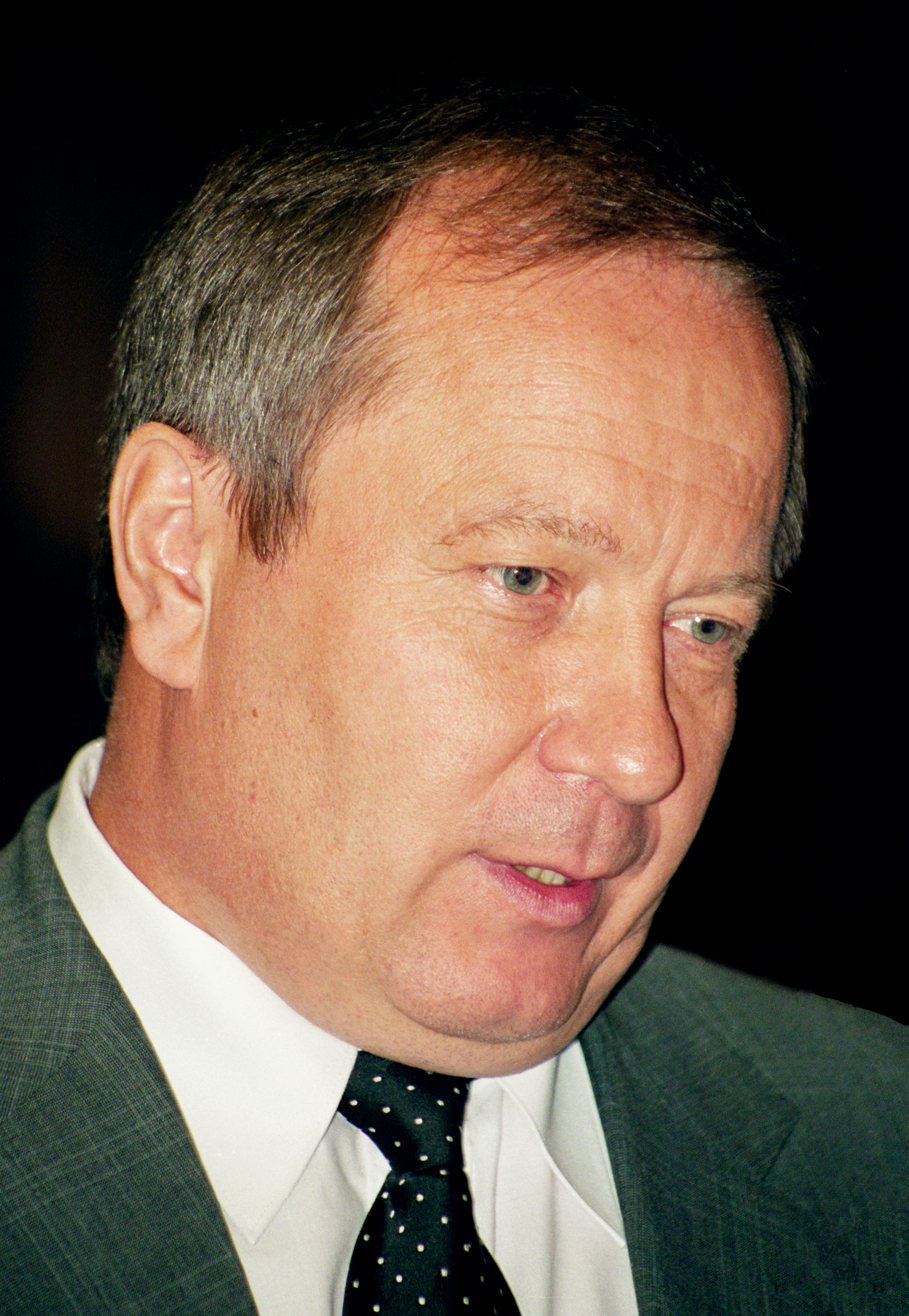
- Skuratov in 2000

Prosecutor-General of Russia
- In office 24 October 1995 – 2 February 1999
- President: Boris Yeltsin
- Preceded by: Aleksey Ilyushenko
- Succeeded by: Vladimir Ustinov

Personal details
- Born: Yury Ilyich Skuratov; 3 July 1952 (age 74) Ulan-Ude, Buryat ASSR, Russian SFSR, Soviet Union
- Education: Ural State Law University
- Yury Skuratov's voice Skuratov on his health issues Recorded 24 September 2012

Yury Ilyich Skuratov (Russian: Ю́рий Ильи́ч Скура́тов; born 3 July 1952) is a Russian jurist and politician.

Skuratov was born in Ulan-Ude. From 1995 until 1999, he was Prosecutor-General of Russia. In February 1999, he disclosed the existence of FIMACO.

== Notable investigations ==
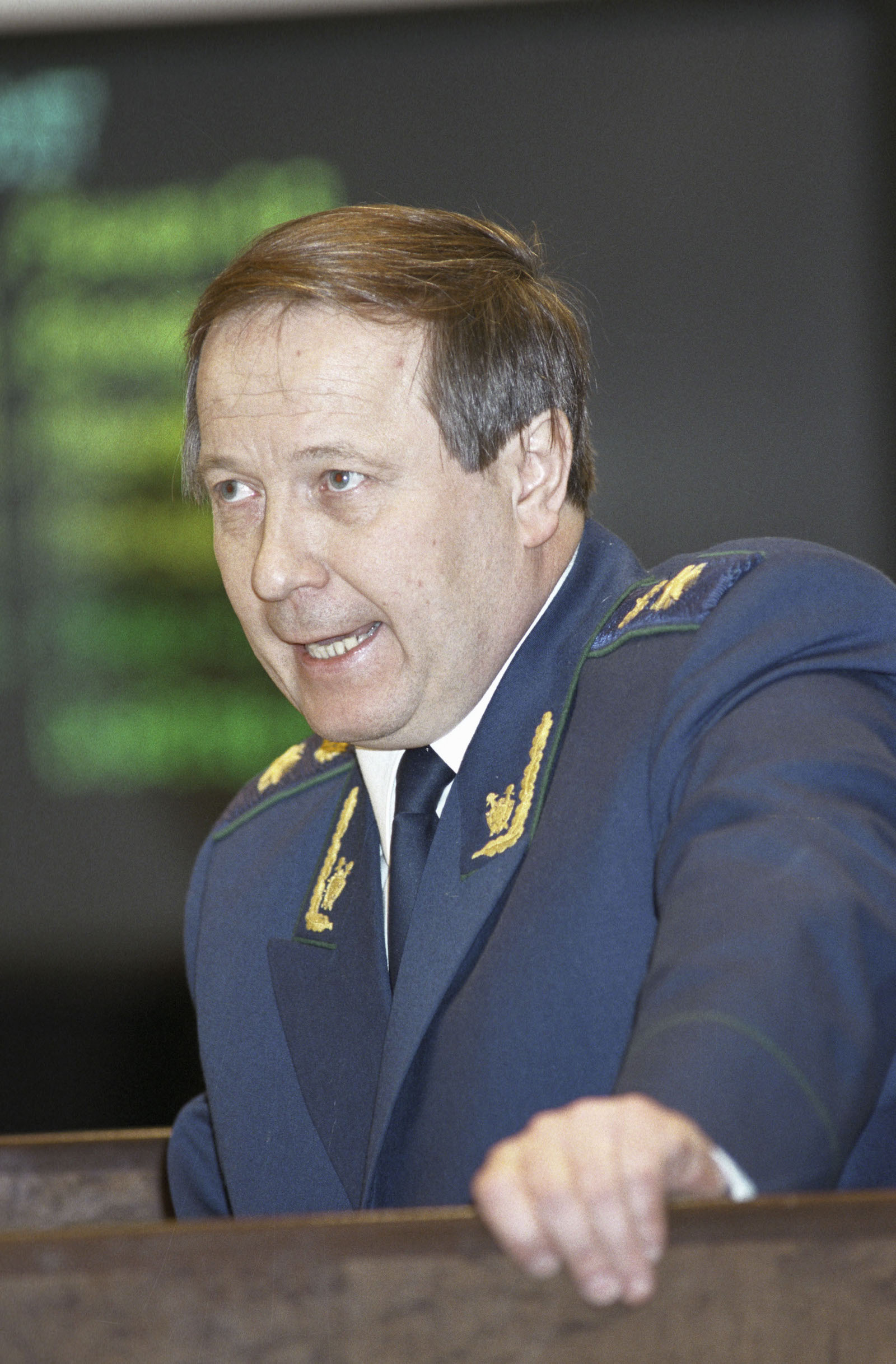
Skuratov as Prosecutor-General of Russia in 1997

Supported with an audit of the financial and economic activities of the office of the Prosecutor-General of Russia which was investigated by Nikolai Yemelyanov (Russian: Николай Емельянов), (Note: A key prospective witness in improper financial affairs was Lyubov Tarasova (Russian: Любовь Тарасова) who was a senior auditor for the Central Bank of Russia and worked for the "Unicom" (Russian: "Юникон") auditing firm which had been established on 20 August 1991 and was responsible for "checking the correctness of the documentation and the essence of business transactions that are in doubt" (Russian: "проверка правильности документального оформления и сущности хозяйственных операций, вызывающих сомнение"), but was stabbed to death in her apartment in Moscow on 15–16 October 1997.) Skuratov spearheaded a corruption investigation into the former acting Prosecutor-General of Russia Alexey Ilyushenko (Russian: Алексей Николаевич Ильюшенко; b. 23 September 1957, Anzhero-Sudzhensk, Kemerovo Oblast, Soviet Union) and his friend Pyotr Yanchev (Russian: Петр Янчев). (Note: The charges that Alexey Ilyushenko had against Yelena Masyuk were dropped in August 1995 amid the corruption scandal about Ilyushenko.)

Ilyushenko was forced to resign on 8 October 1995 because of a 97 volume indictment on him involving the theft of 25 million tons of Russian oil, which was worth 2.7 billion rubles, from the Balkar Trading company (Russian: СП "Балкар-Трейдинг"). Balkar Trading, formed in Balashikha, was one of the largest Russian oil traders in the early to mid 1990s and was in competition with Boris Berezovsky's interests. BAM-Credit (Russian: банк «БАМ-кредит»), which had Balkar Trading accounts, was the dominant financier of gold mining in the Irkutsk and Magadan regions.

Because of a Swiss criminal investigation, the Geneva investigator S. Esposito froze the Swiss accounts of Balkar Trading's Swiss branch known as "Balcar Trading Sari", which was a June 1994 established shell company owned by both his wife Tatiana Vladimirovna Ilyushenko (Russian: Татьяна Владимировна Ильюшенко), who was also an attorney for the Balkar Bank (Russian: "Балкар-банка"), and Pyotr Golovinov (Russian: Петр Головинов; b. 1968 or 1969) who was Yanchev's right-hand man and organized the movement of the foreign assets of Balkar Trading, BAM-Credit, and the Russian House of Selenga (RDS) (Russian: АОЗТ «Русский Дом Селенга» (РДС)) to the Swiss firm "Balcar Trading Sari".

On 1 November 1996, the Geneva Prosecutor indictments upheld the frozen Swiss accounts and Ilyushenko was detained in a pre trial jail for the next two years. However, on 11 May 2001, these charges on Alexey Ilyushenko and his friend Pyotr Yanchev (Russian: Петр Янчев), who was the head of Balkar Trading, were dropped by Vladimir Ustinov. (Note: From July 2002 to 3 September 2002, Ilya Naumovich Gavrilov (Russian: Гаврилов Илья Наумович; b. Turkmenistan), a former employee of Balkar Trading from 1992 to 1996 and former member of the Board of Directors of the Federal Deposit Bank (Russian: Федеральный депозитный банк) which had been owned by Balkar Trading, and Arslan Kakaev (Russian: Арслан Какаев; b. 1982 or 1983), who headed the international operations department of the Central Bank of Turkmenistan and was the only clerk at the Central Bank of Turkmenistan who knew the codes for SWIFT electronic transfers, were involved in a scheme to acquire $41.5 million from the Central Bank of Turkmenistan and place the funds in accounts associated with Michigan Ltd. ($1.25 million) registered in Britain, Perouette Ltd ($4.22 million) and Formex Corporation ($5.22 million) both registered in the Seychelles, Telford International Holding ($9.01 million) registered in the United States and Swan Citi Bancorp Llc ($20 million) registered in Moscow at various banks including Deutsche Bank in Frankfurt, and most of the money went to banks in Riga at Parex Bank ($10 million from Telford International Holding) and Lateco Bank Riga ($10 million from Formex Corporation) which both Gavrilov and a Mrs. Niyazova (Russian: госпожа Ниязова) accessed these funds.)

In the late 1990s, Skuratov and Carla Del Ponte with Filipe Turover providing evidence investigated Russian corruption involving high ranking Russian officials. (Note: According to Felipe Turover Chudínov (Russian: Филипп Генрихович Туровер), police searched the office of Franco Fennini, the former deputy director of the Gatardo bank, and found materials supporting the investigations. Turover's father Genrich Yakovlevich Turover (Russian: Генрих Яковлевич Туровер) once headed of the Department of Romance Languages at the Maurice Thorez Institute of Foreign Languages, was the creator of Spanish-Russian dictionaries and textbooks and, during the Soviet period, was an expert translator of Spanish and French for Soviet diplomats. From 1998 until 2006, the CEO of Banco del Gottardo was Marco Netzer.) (Note: Markus "Marco" J. Netzer (born 10 December 1955, Graubünden) received his baccalaureate in Lugano and obtained his law degree in 1984 from the University of Zurich after which he had a two-year banking internship with UBS in Zurich. For seven years at Ticino beginning in 1988, he worked at UBS's Locarno branch as a financial assistant and later headed its private banking and asset allocation division. Then he headed UBS's private banking division at its Hong Kong branch before heading its Asian branch, which also covers both Taiwan and Singapore. As CEO from 1998 until 2006 at Banco del Gottardo, Marco Netzer oversaw the Swiss Life acquisition of Banco del Gottardo from Sumitomo Bank at the beginning of his tenure in 1999, the closing of Banca del Gottardo's Hong Kong branch by 2004, and the selling of Banque du Gothard (Monaco) to the Geneva-based Banque Jacob Safra (Suisse) SA in 2005 which became part of Bank J. Safra Sarasin AG through an announcement of the merger between Bank Sarasin and Bank Jacob Safra Switzerland on 27 May 2013.) Earlier, both Italian and German Tax officials had started investigations into corrupt Russian officials. Felipe Turover Chudínov, a senior intelligence officer with the foreign-intelligence directorate of the KGB, alleged that $15 billion of IMF funds had been funneled through Switzerland, Lichtenstein and Caribbean countries as black cash or obschak to support Kremlin friendly operations and companies.

== Scandal and dismissal ==
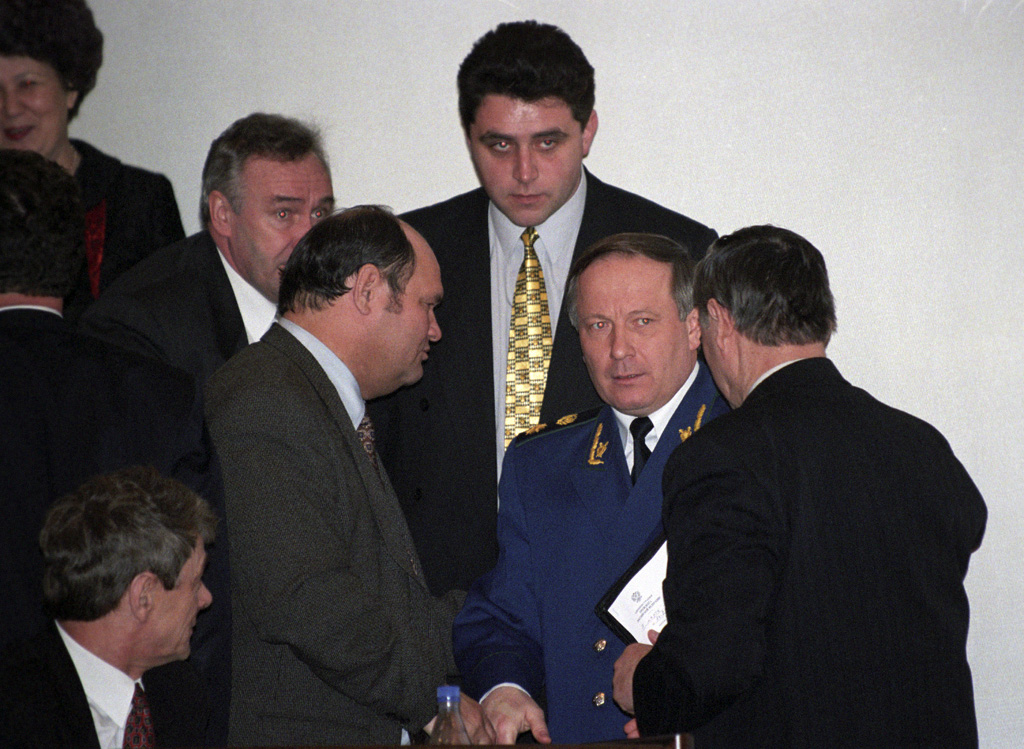
Prosecutor-General Skuratov at a Federation Council meeting on his resignation, March 17, 1999

In April 1999, then FSB Chief Vladimir Putin and Interior Minister Sergei Stepashin held a televised press conference in which they discussed a video that both Mikhail Shvydkoy and Mikhail Lesin agreed to release and that had aired nationwide on 17 March on the state-controlled RTR channel which showed a naked man very similar to Skuratov, in bed with two young women.

This video was released after he had been investigating numerous corrupt officials including Alexander Mamut and both Pavel Borodin and Vladimir Putin and had begun looking into charges of corruption by President Boris Yeltsin and his associates: the video was said to serve as kompromat.

Skuratov's dismissal occurred just days before a second search of the owner of Mabetex the Albanian businessman Behgjet Pacolli linked interests during an ongoing money laundering investigation which had begun in 1992 in Bern involving Pacolli and Yakutiya (Russian: Якутия) officials involved in gold and diamonds especially the Mayor of Yakutsk Pavel Pavlovich Borodin who was Putin's architect for the transfer of the Presidential Property Management Department assets to LLCs, JSCs, and Joint Ventures during early 1997.

In early 2000, Filipe Turover sent messages from his Swiss residence to Moscow prosecutors "I'm ready to talk about Putin. Always your Turover." The Russian prosecutor Ruslan Tamaev (Russian: Руслан Тамаев) headed the Russian investigations into Mabetex which ended when his half brothers Hasan and Hussein were charged with illegal possession of drugs and weapons and he was subsequently removed from investigations. A few months later the charges against his half brothers were dropped.

In April 2000, Skuratov was fired as chief prosecutor after serving a suspension for accusing top officials of corruption.

== 2000 presidential campaign ==
In 2000, Skuratov ran in the Russian presidential elections.

Skuratov's campaign largely ran advertisements intended to remediate the damage inflicted to his reputation by the video which had been released in 1999. These ads portrayed him as a decent family man and a faithful husband who had been the victim of "lies" and "fabrications".

In the limited coverage he was allotted, Russian media treated him as a sideshow rather than as a serious contender for the presidency.

== Books ==
- Скуратов, Юрий Ильич (Skuratov, Yury Ilyich) (2013). Кремлёвские подряды: Последнее дело прокурора [Kremlin contracts. The last case of the Attorney General] (in Russian). Moscow: ООО «Издательство Алгоритм» (Algorithm Publishing House). ISBN 978-5-4438-0301-2.
- Belton, Catherine (23 June 2020). Putin's People: How the KGB Took Back Russia and Then Took on the West. New York: Farrar, Straus, Giroux. ISBN 978-0374238711.
