= 2000 Russian presidential election =

- 26 March 2000
- Opinion polls
- Registered: 109,372,043
- Turnout: 68.64% ▼0.14pp

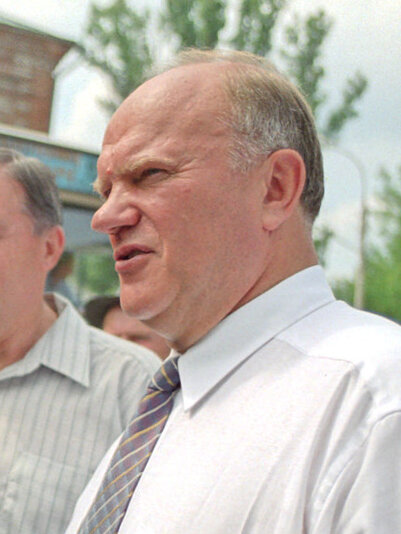

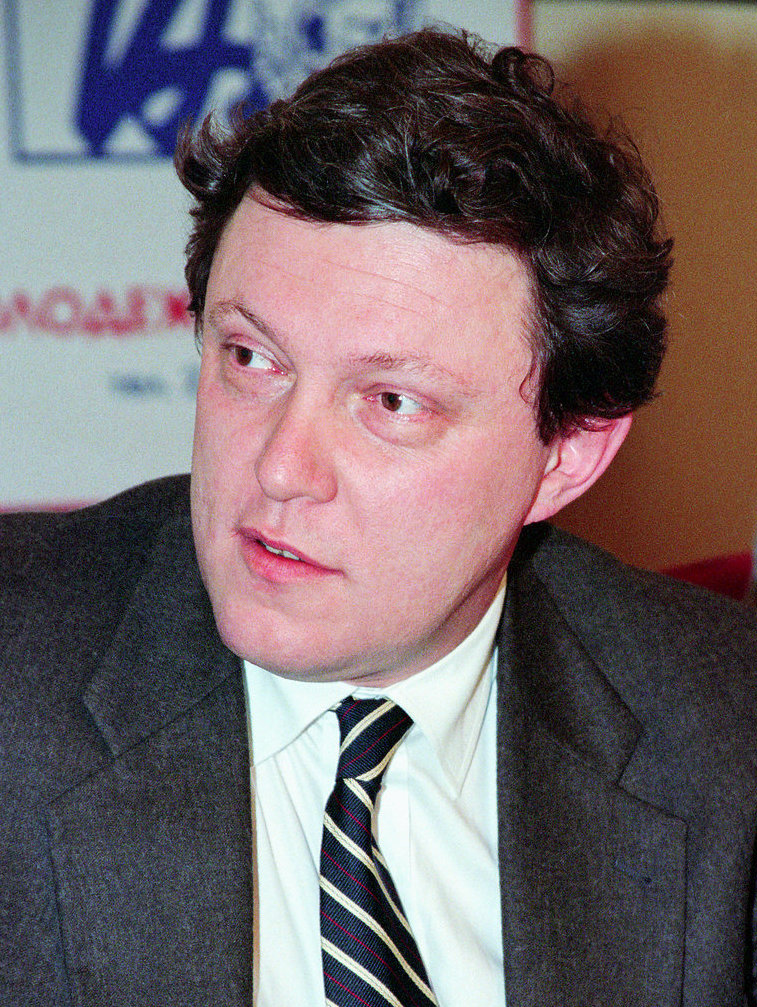
Nominee	Vladimir Putin	Gennady Zyuganov	Grigory Yavlinsky
Party	Independent	CPRF	Yabloko
Alliance	Unity, OVR, SPS
Popular vote	39,740,434	21,928,471	4,351,452
Percentage	53.44%	29.49%	5.85%
- Results by federal subject Vladimir Putin: 40–45% 45–50% 50–55% 55–60% 60–65% 65–70% 75–80% 80–85% 85–90% Gennady Zyuganov: 40–45% 45–50% Aman Tuleyev: 50–55%
Acting President before election
Vladimir Putin
Independent
Elected President
Vladimir Putin
Independent

Presidential elections were held in Russia on 26 March 2000. Incumbent prime minister and acting president Vladimir Putin, who had succeeded Boris Yeltsin after his resignation on 31 December 1999, sought a four-year term in his own right and won in the first round.

As of 2026, this is the last Russian presidential election in which losers (Gennady Zyuganov and Aman Tuleyev) carried federal subjects. In all subsequent presidential elections, the winner carried all federal subjects. It was also the last Russian presidential election considered free.

== Background ==
In spring 1998, Boris Yeltsin dismissed his long-time head of government, Viktor Chernomyrdin, replacing him with Sergey Kirienko. Months later, in the wake of the August 1998 economic crisis in which the government defaulted on its debt and devalued the rouble simultaneously, Kirienko was replaced in favor of Yevgeny Primakov. In May 1999, Primakov was replaced with Sergei Stepashin. Then in August 1999, Vladimir Putin was named prime minister, making him the fifth in less than two years. Putin was not expected to last long in the role and was initially unknown and unpopular due to his ties to the Yeltsin government and state security. In the late summer and early fall of 1999, a wave of apartment bombings across Russia killed hundreds and injured thousands. The bombings, blamed on the Chechens, provided the opportunity for Putin to position himself as a strong and aggressive leader, capable of dealing with the Chechen threat.

Yeltsin had become exceedingly unpopular. Yeltsin was increasingly concerned about the Skuratov, Mercata and Mabetex scandals that had prompted articles of impeachment. He narrowly survived impeachment in May 1999. In mid-1999, Yevgeny Primakov and Yuri Luzhkov were considered the frontrunners for the presidency. Both were critical of Yeltsin, and he feared that they might prosecute him and his family for corruption should they ascend to power. Primakov had suggested that he would be "freeing up jail cells for the economic criminals he planned to arrest."

On 19 December 1999, the Kremlin's Unity Party finished second in the parliamentary elections with 23 percent; the Communist Party was first with 24 percent. By forming a coalition with Yabloko and the Union of Right Forces, Yeltsin had secured a favorable majority in the Duma. By the December election, Putin's popularity had risen to 79% with 42% saying they would vote for him for president.

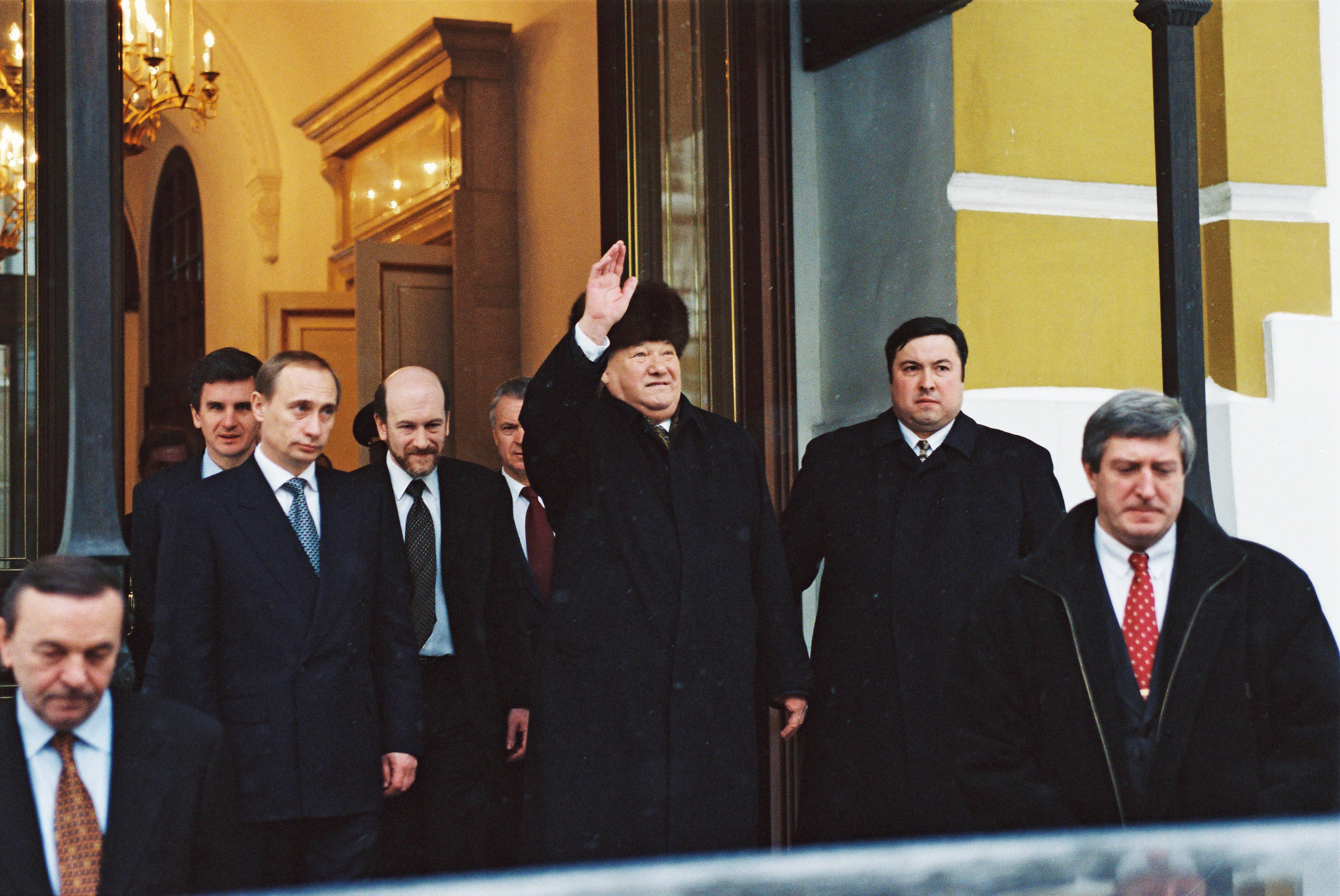
Yeltsin on the day of his resignation, together with Putin and Alexander Voloshin

On New Year's Eve 1999, Yeltsin announced that he would be resigning early in the belief that "Russia should enter the new millennium with new politicians, new faces, new people, who are intelligent, strong and energetic, while we, those who have been in power for many years, must leave." In accordance with the constitution, Putin became acting president.

The elections would be held on 26 March 2000, as Russian law required an election to be scheduled three months after the office of president is vacated. Before Yeltsin's resignation, the 2000 presidential election had been expected to be held in June or July. The Duma had originally passed legislation scheduling the first round of the election for 4 June, with a runoff scheduled for 25 June if necessitated.

In early 2000 Unity and the Communist Party had developed an alliance in the Duma that effectively cut off Putin's rivals, Yevgeny Primakov, Grigory Yavlinsky, and Sergei Kiriyenko. Yuri Luzhkov, the reelected Mayor of Moscow, announced that he would not compete for the presidency; Primakov pulled out two weeks after the parliamentary elections. The early election also reduced the chances that public sentiment would turn against the conflict in Chechnya.

=== New campaign law ===
A new federal law, "On the election of the president of the Russian Federation" was passed in December 1999. It required that candidates gather a million signatures to be nominated (although the shortened election meant this was reduced to 500,000). A majority in the first round was enough to win. Failing that, a second round of voting between the top two candidates would be decided by majority vote. The new law also created stricter campaign finance provisions. The new law, in conjunction with the early election would have further helped Putin, who could rely on favorable state television coverage.

== Candidates ==
Of 33 candidates nominated, 15 submitted application forms to the Central Electoral Committee of Russia, which registered 12. They are listed in the Russian alphabetical order they appeared on the ballot.

Candidate name, age, political party	Political offices	Registration date
Stanislav Govorukhin (64); Independent	Deputy of the State Duma (1994-2003 and 2005–2018); Film director	15 February 2000
Umar Dzhabrailov (41); Power of Reason	Businessman	18 February 2000
Vladimir Zhirinovsky (53); Liberal Democratic Party (campaign)	Deputy of the State Duma (1994–2022); Leader of the Liberal Democratic Party (1991–2022)	2 March 2000
Gennady Zyuganov (55); Communist Party (campaign)	Deputy of the State Duma (1994–present); Leader of the Communist Party (1993–present)	28 January 2000
Ella Pamfilova (46); For Civic Dignity	Minister of Social Protection of the Population of Russia (1991–1994)	15 February 2000
Alexey Podberezkin (47); Spiritual Heritage	Deputy of the State Duma (1996–2000)	29 January 2000
Vladimir Putin (47); Independent; Endorsed by Unity, OVR and SPS (campaign)	Acting President of Russia (1999–2000); Prime Minister of Russia (1999–2000); Director of the Federal Security Service (1998–1999)	7 February 2000
Yury Skuratov (47); Independent (campaign)	Prosecutor General of Russia (1995–1999)	18 February 2000
Konstantin Titov (55); Independent (campaign)	Governor of Samara Oblast (1991–2007)	10 February 2000
Aman Tuleyev (55); Independent (campaign)	Governor of Kemerovo Oblast (1997–2018)	7 February 2000
Grigory Yavlinsky (47); Yabloko (campaign)	Deputy of the State Duma (1994–2003); Leader of the Yabloko party (1995–2008)	15 February 2000

=== Withdrawn ===
Candidate name, age, political party	Political offices	Details	Registration date	Date of withdrawal
Yevgeny Savostyanov (48); Independent	Kremlin Deputy Chief of Staff (1996–1998)	Supported Grigory Yavlinsky.	18 February 2000	21 March 2000

== Campaign ==
Gennady Zyuganov and Grigory Yavlinsky were the two strongest opposition candidates. Zyuganov ran on a platform of resistance to wholesale public ownership, though he supported a return of illegally privatized property to the state. He opposed public land ownership and advocated for strong public services to be provided by the state. He would also strengthen the country's defense capabilities and would resist expansion by the United States and NATO. Grigorii Yavlinsky (Yabloko) ran as a free marketer but with measured state control. He wanted stronger oversight of public money, an end to the black market and reform of the tax system coinciding with an increase in public services. He also advocated for a strengthened role for the State Duma and a reduction in the size of the civil bureaucracy. He was the most pro-Western candidate, but only to an extent as he had been critical of the war in Chechnya yet remained skeptical of NATO. One of Putin's major campaign platforms was "dictatorship of the law" and "the stronger the state, the freer the people."

Putin mounted almost no campaign in advance of the 2000 elections. "He held no rallies, gave no speeches, and refused to participate in debates with his challengers." The extent of Putin's campaign was a biographical interview broadcast on State Television, and a series of interviews with journalists, paid for by Boris Berezovsky, an oligarch who had helped to build the Unity Party in the Yeltsin years. Putin's platform was best reflected by an "Open letter to Russian voters" that ran in national newspapers on 25 February 2000. Because he refused to participate in the debates, Putin's challengers had no venue in which to challenge his program, vague as it may have been. A number of other candidates explained this as a refusal to clarify his position on various controversial issues.

Uncritical state television coverage of Putin's leadership of the conflict in Chechnya helped him to consolidate his popularity as Prime Minister, even as Yeltsin's popularity as president fell. Analysis of television coverage of the 1999 Duma and 2000 presidential elections found that "it was ORT, and state television more generally, that had helped to create a party on short notice" and that "its coverage... was strongly supportive of the party it had created." Further, TV channel ORT aggressively attacked credible opponents to Unity and Putin. Putin "received over a third of the coverage devoted to the candidates on all television channels, as much as Zyuganov (12%), Yavlinsky (11%) and Zhirinovsky (11%) put together." He received more than a third of print media coverage, and was given outsize coverage even in opposition newspapers.

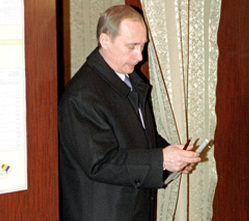
Vladimir Putin casting his vote

Putin announced a new press policy after he won the election. He stated that he believed in "free press" but this should not let the media become "means of mass disinformation and tools of struggle against the state." He encouraged the state-owned media to control the market and provide the people with "objective information."

== Conduct ==
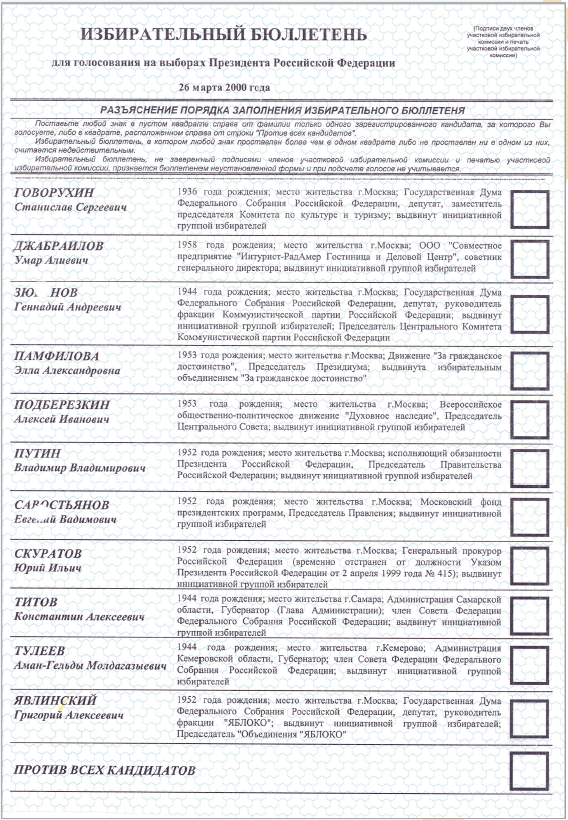
Ballot paper

The decision to conduct the presidential elections also in Chechnya was perceived as controversial by many observers due to the military campaign and security concerns. The legislative elections held on 19 December 1999 had been suspended in Chechnya for these reasons.

There were many alleged serious forgeries reported that could have affected Putin's victory in the first round.

=== Media bias ===
The PACE observers delegation concluded that "the unequal access to television was one of the main reasons for a degree of unfairness of the campaign" and that "independent media have come under increasing pressure and that media in general, be they State-owned or private, failed to a large extent to provide impartial information about the election campaign and candidates."

The PACE delegation also reported that the media got more and more dominated by politically influential owners. The TV channel ORT launched a slanderous campaign against Yavlinsky's image as his ratings started to rise sharply, and broadcasters generally nearly ignored candidates who did not fulfill interests of their owners. One of the main independent broadcasters, NTV, was subject to increasing financial and administrative pressure during the electoral campaign.

Harassment by the Kremlin was utilized to quiet criticism from domestic independent and opposition media, particularly television broadcasters. State agencies pressured media outlets (especially television outlets) to avoid issuing negative reports on the Chechen War. The two primary state-controlled media outlets gave overwhelmingly positive coverage to Putin's handling of the war. Multiple Western journalists (such as the Boston Globe's David Fillipov) had been either detained or expelled from the country because they strayed from Russian military guidance in Chechnya. Andrei Babitsky (a correspondent for Radio Liberty) was arrested under charges of aiding the Chechens. Under both Yeltsin and Putin, the Kremlin apparatus was applying financial pressure to Media-Most, a media holding group which had been unfriendly in their coverage.

On the other hand, Zyuganov received much fairer media coverage than he had been subject to in the previous presidential election.

== Results ==
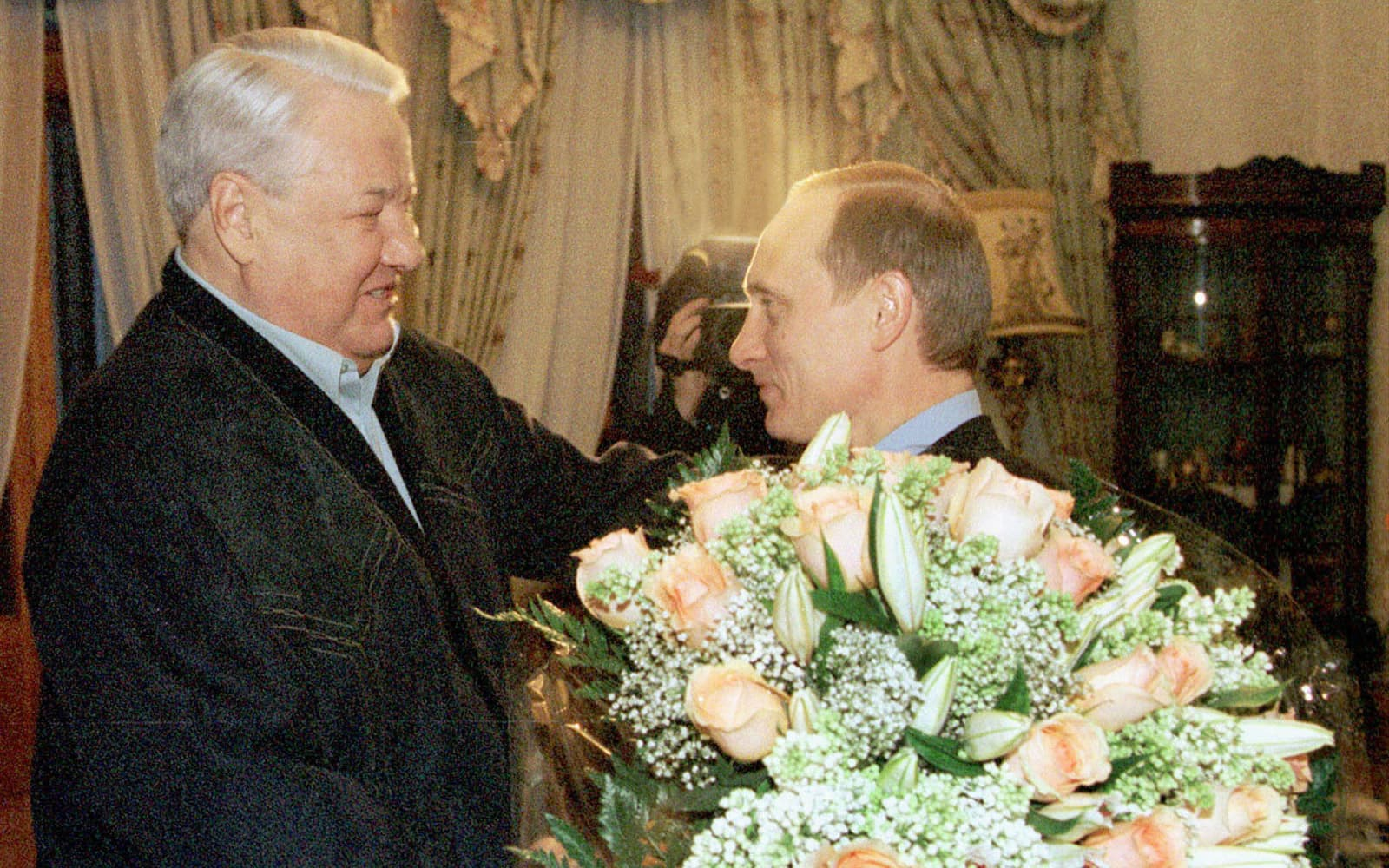
Former president Boris Yeltsin congratulating Putin on his victory on the day after the election

Polling stations were open from 8:00 a.m. to 8:00 p.m. Putin won on the first ballot with 53.4% of the vote. Putin's highest official result was 85.42% in Ingushetia, while his lowest achievement was 29.65% in neighboring Chechnya. Zyuganov's results ranged from 47.41% in the Lipetsk region to 4.63% in Ingushetia. Yavlinsky's results ranged from 18.56% in Moscow to 0.42% in Dagestan. Zhirinovsky's results ranged from 6.13% in the Kamchatka region to 0.29% in Ingushetia.

Candidate	Party	Votes	%
Vladimir Putin	Independent	39,740,434	53.44
Gennady Zyuganov	Communist Party	21,928,471	29.49
Grigory Yavlinsky	Yabloko	4,351,452	5.85
Aman Tuleyev	Independent	2,217,361	2.98
Vladimir Zhirinovsky	Liberal Democratic Party	2,026,513	2.72
Konstantin Titov (Note: Titov was unofficially aligned with the Union of Rightist Forces.)	Independent	1,107,269	1.49
Ella Pamfilova	For Civic Dignity	758,966	1.02
Stanislav Govorukhin	Independent	328,723	0.44
Yury Skuratov	Independent	319,263	0.43
Alexey Podberezkin	Spiritual Heritage	98,175	0.13
Umar Dzhabrailov	Power of Reason	78,498	0.11
Against all		1,414,648	1.90
Total		74,369,773	100.00
Valid votes		74,369,773	99.07
Invalid/blank votes		701,003	0.93
Total votes		75,070,776	100.00
Registered voters/turnout		109,372,046	68.64
Source: CEC

=== Results by federal subject ===
Federal subject	Putin	Zyuganov	Yavlinsky	Zhirinovsky	Against all
Adygea	44.58%	44.62%	3.00%	1.70%	1.18%
Agin-Buryat Autonomous Okrug	62.80%	26.31%	1.28%	2.80%	0.60%
Altai Krai	44.77%	40.02%	3.57%	3.99%	1.09%
Altai Republic	37.89%	42.72%	2.63%	3.01%	1.20%
Amur Oblast	49.33%	33.54%	3.10%	5.94%	1.43%
Arkhangelsk Oblast	59.59%	20.25%	6.36%	3.71%	2.12%
Astrakhan Oblast	60.86%	26.77%	2.56%	2.57%	1.10%
Bashkortostan	60.34%	28.11%	3.21%	1.51%	1.00%
Belgorod Oblast	47.59%	39.70%	3.43%	2.70%	1.55%
Bryansk Oblast	42.95%	45.99%	2.16%	3.18%	1.19%
Buryatia	41.96%	40.53%	3.72%	2.55%	1.27%
Chechnya	50.63%	22.76%	9.28%	2.62%	3.08%
Chelyabinsk Oblast	49.39%	32.05%	7.77%	2.88%	1.87%
Chita Oblast	49.14%	35.48%	2.07%	5.87%	1.33%
Chukotka Autonomous Okrug	67.24%	15.33%	4.60%	3.86%	1.84%
Chuvashia	44.31%	42.80%	3.07%	2.05%	1.04%
Dagestan	76.62%	19.78%	0.42%	0.38%	0.26%
Evenki Autonomous Okrug	62.01%	21.30%	3.13%	3.67%	1.81%
Ingushetia	85.42%	4.63%	4.45%	0.29%	0.62%
Ivanovo Oblast	53.46%	29.72%	4.81%	3.60%	1.88%
Irkutsk Oblast	50.08%	33.05%	5.06%	3.91%	1.70%
Jewish Autonomous Oblast	42.87%	39.73%	5.20%	4.11%	1.81%
Kaliningrad Oblast	60.16%	23.50%	6.25%	3.65%	1.51%
Kabardino-Balkaria	74.72%	19.77%	1.57%	0.48%	0.61%
Kalmykia	56.38%	32.04%	1.77%	1.23%	0.95%
Kaluga Oblast	50.99%	33.77%	5.58%	2.25%	1.88%
Kamchatka Oblast	48.72%	28.17%	6.34%	6.13%	2.35%
Karachay-Cherkessia	56.27%	36.15%	1.92%	1.09%	1.01%
Karelia	64.20%	17.01%	7.44%	3.39%	1.84%
Kemerovo Oblast	25.01%	14.93%	3.06%	2.22%	0.97%
Khabarovsk Krai	49.52%	28.07%	7.61%	5.30%	2.72%
Khanty-Mansi Autonomous Okrug	60.13%	22.13%	6.91%	3.51%	1.75%
Khakassia	42.26%	36.55%	3.20%	4.49%	1.41%
Kirov Oblast	58.30%	27.54%	3.62%	2.69%	1.31%
Komi-Permyak Autonomous Okrug	70.12%	17.92%	1.89%	4.02%	1.09%
Komi Republic	59.92%	21.76%	6.82%	3.22%	1.62%
Koryak Autonomous Okrug	61.12%	20.11%	4.19%	4.66%	1.39%
Kostroma Oblast	59.05%	25.70%	3.86%	3.58%	1.47%
Krasnodar Krai	51.50%	37.38%	3.42%	2.11%	1.22%
Krasnoyarsk Krai	48.30%	32.85%	5.52%	4.24%	2.33%
Kurgan Oblast	48.31%	36.39%	3.21%	4.62%	1.37%
Kursk Oblast	50.17%	39.57%	2.39%	2.33%	1.02%
Leningrad Oblast	66.53%	19.05%	5.12%	2.65%	1.52%
Lipetsk Oblast	40.86%	47.41%	3.09%	2.27%	1.71%
Magadan Oblast	61.97%	22.53%	3.68%	5.33%	1.50%
Mari El	44.83%	40.24%	3.47%	2.77%	1.67%
Mordovia	59.86%	30.84%	1.36%	2.03%	0.83%
Moscow Oblast	48.01%	27.94%	10.27%	2.23%	3.72%
Moscow	46.26%	19.16%	18.56%	1.58%	5.92%
Murmansk Oblast	65.89%	15.72%	7.03%	3.77%	2.00%
Nenets Autonomous Okrug	59.49%	20.84%	5.05%	4.50%	2.29%
Nizhny Novgorod Oblast	53.59%	32.71%	4.01%	2.51%	1.89%
North Ossetia-Alania	64.61%	28.51%	0.98%	1.31%	0.80%
Novgorod Oblast	64.73%	21.44%	5.27%	2.52%	1.43%
Novosibirsk Oblast	39.91%	38.23%	7.94%	3.35%	1.66%
Omsk Oblast	38.14%	43.64%	6.65%	3.32%	2.06%
Orenburg Oblast	45.21%	42.50%	2.86%	2.82%	0.82%
Oryol Oblast	45.84%	44.61%	1.90%	2.41%	1.44%
Penza Oblast	49.35%	38.17%	3.31%	2.46%	1.35%
Perm Oblast	60.78%	19.98%	7.30%	3.47%	1.81%
Primorsky Krai	40.12%	36.36%	8.02%	5.93%	1.92%
Pskov Oblast	62.55%	25.65%	2.70%	2.69%	1.05%
Rostov Oblast	52.59%	32.93%	5.42%	2.41%	1.51%
Ryazan Oblast	48.64%	36.50%	4.11%	2.49%	1.76%
Saint Petersburg	62.42%	16.95%	10.58%	1.87%	2.48%
Sakha Republic	52.46%	30.18%	4.38%	2.98%	1.72%
Samara Oblast	41.05%	29.75%	2.81%	1.76%	1.18%
Saratov Oblast	58.29%	28.28%	3.65%	2.18%	1.53%
Sakhalin Oblast	46.71%	30.80%	7.48%	5.62%	2.23%
Sverdlovsk Oblast	62.75%	17.21%	7.64%	3.94%	1.62%
Smolensk Oblast	52.49%	34.73%	3.30%	3.03%	1.41%
Stavropol Krai	52.11%	36.52%	3.00%	2.06%	1.33%
Tambov Oblast	48.14%	41.30%	2.61%	2.25%	1.19%
Tatarstan	68.89%	20.57%	2.59%	1.21%	0.95%
Taymyr Autonomous Okrug	64.70%	14.85%	5.90%	4.28%	1.75%
Tomsk Oblast	52.49%	25.27%	9.01%	3.35%	1.67%
Tula Oblast	48.01%	36.56%	5.60%	2.31%	2.17%
Tuva	61.60%	27.75%	1.67%	1.92%	0.91%
Tver Oblast	57.65%	27.92%	4.56%	2.59%	1.51%
Tyumen Oblast	54.20%	28.73%	4.96%	4.60%	1.39%
Udmurtia	61.06%	24.82%	2.81%	2.96%	1.27%
Ulyanovsk Oblast	47.60%	38.18%	2.90%	2.46%	1.15%
Ust-Orda Buryat Autonomous Okrug	56.80%	31.30%	1.27%	2.54%	0.56%
Vladimir Oblast	53.14%	30.68%	5.12%	2.83%	1.87%
Volgograd Oblast	53.50%	33.86%	3.81%	2.32%	1.32%
Vologda Oblast	66.58%	19.11%	3.97%	2.99%	1.23%
Voronezh Oblast	56.75%	31.78%	2.84%	2.99%	1.41%
Yamalo-Nenets Autonomous Okrug	59.01%	20.57%	8.68%	3.61%	1.73%
Yaroslavl Oblast	63.78%	20.29%	4.86%	2.91%	1.71%
Source: CEC
