= Umar Dzhabrailov =

Russian politician (1958–2026)

- Умар Джабраилов
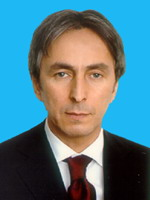
- Official portrait, 2008

Russian Federation Senator from the Chechen Republic
- In office 14 January 2004 – 7 October 2009
- Preceded by: Akhmar Zavgayev
- Succeeded by: Suleiman Geremeyev

Personal details
- Born: 28 June 1958 Grozny, Checheno-Ingush ASSR, Russian SFSR, USSR
- Died: 2 March 2026 (aged 67) Moscow, Russia
- Cause of death: Suicide by gunshot
- Party: CPSU; United Russia
- Education: Moscow State Institute of International Relations
- Occupation: Russian political advisor

Umar Aliyevich Dzhabrailov (Russian: Умар Алиевич Джабраилов; 28 June 1958 – 2 March 2026) was a Russian businessman and politician of Chechen descent, who served as the representative to the Federation Council of Russia from the executive body of the Chechen Republic (2004–2009). He also was the vice-president of the Artists Union of Russia, a member of the Russian delegation to the Parliamentary Assembly of the Council of Europe, and as an advisor to Sergei Prikhodko, the Assistant to the President of Russia.

== Early life and career ==
From 1973 to 1977, Dzhabrailov studied at the Rospotrebsoyuz College in Moscow. From 1977 to 1979, he served in the Soviet Army in the Strategic Missile Forces in Korosten in Ukraine, holding the rank of Captain. In 1985, Dzhabrailov graduated with honors from the Moscow State Institute of International Relations (MGIMO) of the Ministry of Foreign Affairs. In 1989, he became general director of LLP "Danako". In the mid 1990s, he was involved in the killing of his American business partner, Paul Tatum; the killing was because of a series of disagreements over the Radisson Hotel.

Dzhabraliov was a candidate in the 2000 Russian presidential election.

In 2001, he was appointed Chairman of the Board of Directors of First Mutual Credit Society Bank. From 2001 to 2004, he was a President of the "Group Plaza”. From 2004 to 2009, he was a senator from the Chechen Republic.

== Personal life ==
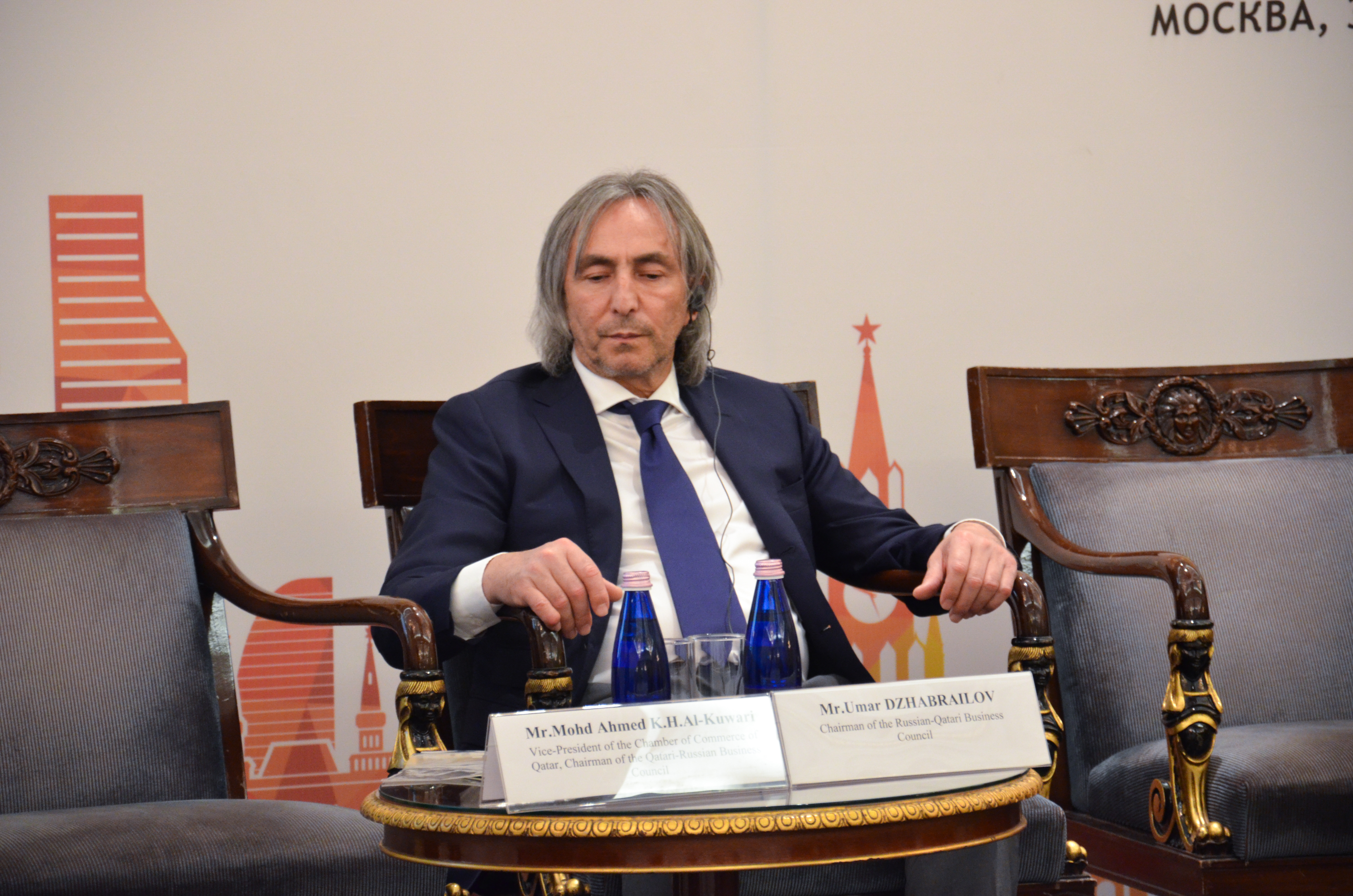
Dzhabrailov in 2016

Dzhabrailov was often associated with Italian and Russian designers and artists, including Roberto Cavalli, Aldo Rota, and well as having been acquainted with Zurab Tsereteli. With Roberto Cavalli, he opened the restaurant Just Cavalli on the site of the past restaurant Prague. Dzhabrailov was a collector of works of art, including paintings by Russian artists. and often supported the arts. Beginning in 2010, he was actively involved in the Moscow Forum of Culture.

He had two daughters from his first marriage. Dzhabrailov was married to a Russian artist. He was fluent in English, German, and Italian and understood French, Spanish, and Czech. He held a diploma of the Federation Council. He was an academician at the Russian Academy of Natural Sciences.

== Relationship with Jeffrey Epstein ==
Dzhabrailov is named in the Epstein files released in January 2026. Documents from the Epstein files reveal direct communications in May–June 2001 between Dzhabrailov and Ghislaine Maxwell coordinating travel plans to Moscow that explicitly include Jeffrey Epstein. The last name is misspelled in the emails it says “Djabrailov” instead of “Dzhabrailov”. In these informal personal emails (contemporaneous but informal correspondence), Maxwell writes to Dzhabrailov: "Sorry that we did not come last week. Got side tracked and ended up in France. However we Jeffrey Tom and I are coming next week arriving Fri. Will you be around and can we get together?" Dzhabrailov responds "I'm back from London, planing 2 B in Moscow. Really want 2 C U, but I need 2 know exactly when U arive, cause I want 2 take care of U and arrange welcoming things."

== Death ==
On 2 March 2026, Dzhabrailov committed suicide with a Luger P08 pistol at a Moscow hotel. He was 67. He had previously attempted suicide in 2020.
