= Konstantin Titov =

Russian politician (born 1944)

- Константин Титов
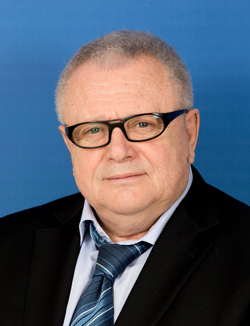
- Titov in 2013

Senator from Samara Oblast
- In office 17 October 2007 – 9 October 2014
- Preceded by: Andrey Ishchuk
- Succeeded by: Dmitry Azarov

Governor of Samara Oblast
- In office 31 August 1991 – 27 August 2007
- Succeeded by: Vladimir Artyakov

Personal details
- Born: Konstantin Alekseyevich Titov; 30 October 1944 (age 81) Moscow, Russian SFSR, Soviet Union
- Education: Kuibishev Aviation Institute

Konstantin Alekseyevich Titov (Russian: Константин Алексеевич Титов; born October 30, 1944) is a Russian politician. He was the Senator from Samara Oblast from 2007 to 2014 and Governor of Samara Oblast from 1991 till 2007.

In 2000 he ran for President of Russia, but lost the election gaining 1.5% of the vote.

== Biography ==
=== Early life ===
Titov was born in 1944, in Moscow.

In 1953, the Titov family moved to Stavropol, Kuibyshev Oblast (now Tolyatti, Samara Oblast).

In 1962, Konstantin Titov graduated from school and entered the Kuibyshev Aviation Institute, graduating in 1968 with a degree in mechanical Engineer for the operation of aircraft and engines. At the same time he worked as a milling machine operator at the Kuibyshev aviation plant.

From 1968 to 1970 year in the direction of the institute worked as a flight engineer aircraft factory.

In 1969 he was elected Deputy Secretary of the Komsomol Committee of the Kuibyshev aviation plant. In 1973 he was elected Secretary of the Komsomol Committee.

In 1975 he entered the graduate school of Kuibyshev Planning Institute, and in 1978 he graduated from it, moving to scientific work in this Institute, where he passed all the steps from Junior researcher to head of the research laboratory, the basic unit of the state planning Committee of the RSFSR in the Volga region economic region. The main scientific topics of Titov's works and publications were the problems of economic efficiency of fixed assets, capital investments and new equipment.

From 1988 to 1990 he worked as deputy director for economics of the Kuibyshev branch Of the research and production center "Informatics" - one of the first enterprises in the USSR, which tried to put applied science on a self-supporting market basis.

=== Policy ===
In March 1990 he was elected to the Kuibyshev City Executive Committee of the Council of People's Deputies, and then became its Chairman (de facto Mayor).

In August 1991, during The "August putsch" as chairman of the Kuibyshev City Executive Committee went on sick leave, sending a letter on behalf of the chairman of the City Council in support of Boris Yeltsin. On 31 August 1991, by decree of the President Yeltsin was appointed Head of Administration (Governor) of the Samara Oblast.

In 1996, he was re-elected Governor of the Samara Oblast, ahead of his main competitor, communist Valentin Romanov.

From 1999 to 2000 he was chairman of the all-Russian political movement "Voice of Russia", as well as chairman of the federal political council of the party "Union of Right Forces".

From 2000 to 2001, he was the leader of the Russian Party of Social Democracy.

In 2000 he was again re-elected Governor of Samara Oblast.

From 2004 to 2007, he was co-chairman of the Social Democratic Party.

In December 2004, the Samara Prosecutor's Office opened cases of abuse and abuse of power against Konstantin Titov and two officials of the regional government. The case related to the illegal loan of 300 million rubles from the regional budget. On 24 February 2005, Titov was reclassified from accused to witness.

On 26 April 2005 the Samara Governorate Duma approved Titov as the governor of Samara Oblast for a new term (at that time direct elections of governors of all subjects were cancelled, and the governors were appointed by the president with the consent of regional parliaments), despite the uncovered criminal case in which Konstantin Titov passed as one of persons involved.

Repeatedly changed political preferences. He was a member of the Russian Democratic Reform Movement, Democratic Choice of Russia, Our Home – Russia, in 1999 created the movement "Voice of Russia", which later joined the Union of Right Forces. In 2000, he headed the Russian Party of Social Democracy, which later merged with the Social Democratic Party. In 2005, he left the Social Democratic Party and joined United Russia.

On 27 August 2007 resigned from the post of Governor of the Samara Oblast on their own.

From 2007 to 2014, he was the senator from the Samara Oblast, Titov represented the executive authority. In 2014, Governor Nikolay Merkushkin recalled Titov, and appointed Mayor of Samara Dmitry Azarov as new Senator.

Since 2014 he is the Member of the Civic Chamber of Samara Oblast.

== 2000 presidential campaign ==
Titov was a candidate in the 2000 Russian presidential election.

Rather than a serious bid for the presidency, his candidacy was speculated to instead be an attempt to garner publicity in order to help him fend-off the challenge he was facing in gubernatorial re-election bid later that year.

On February 13 Titov traveled to the Urals for his first campaign trip.

Titov failed to win the endorsement of the Union of Right Wing Forces. At a 14 March meeting of the bloc's coordinating council the question of the presidential elections was addressed. At the urging of Anatoly Chubais the bloc voted on whether to support Putin's candidacy. Out of the seven members of the coordinating council, four had voted in favor of supporting Putin (Chubais, Gaidar, Kiriyenko, Nekrutenko). Himself one of the seven members of the coordinating council, Titov was joined by Boris Nemtsov in voting in opposition. Irina Khakamada abstained from the vote.

Titov's campaign largely ran different edits of a single advertisement throughout his campaign. This advertisement touted his gubernatorial experience.

Titov urged voters to, "Vote not with your heart, but with your mind".

Titov's campaign touted endorsements from State Duma deputies Sergei Yushenkov, Nikolay Brusnikin, and Hasan Mirzoev. Other Russian politician's whose endorsements they touted included Marina Salier. The campaign also touted celebrity endorsements from Rimma Kazakova, Nikolay Bederin, and Vyacheslav Dobrynin.

Titov ultimately performed well in Samara, where he placed third with 20% of the vote, but failed to perform well elsewhere
