= Nikolay Kharitonov 2024 presidential campaign =

Russian political campaign

- Campaign: 2024 Russian presidential election
- Candidate: Nikolay Kharitonov; Member of the State Duma (1993–present day)
- Affiliation: Communist Party
- Status: Announced: 22 December 2023; Nominee: 23 December 2023; Lost election: 17 March 2024
- Key people: Chief of staff: Gennady Zyuganov
- Slogan(s): We played 'capitalism' - that's enough! (Поиграли в капитализм - и хватит!)

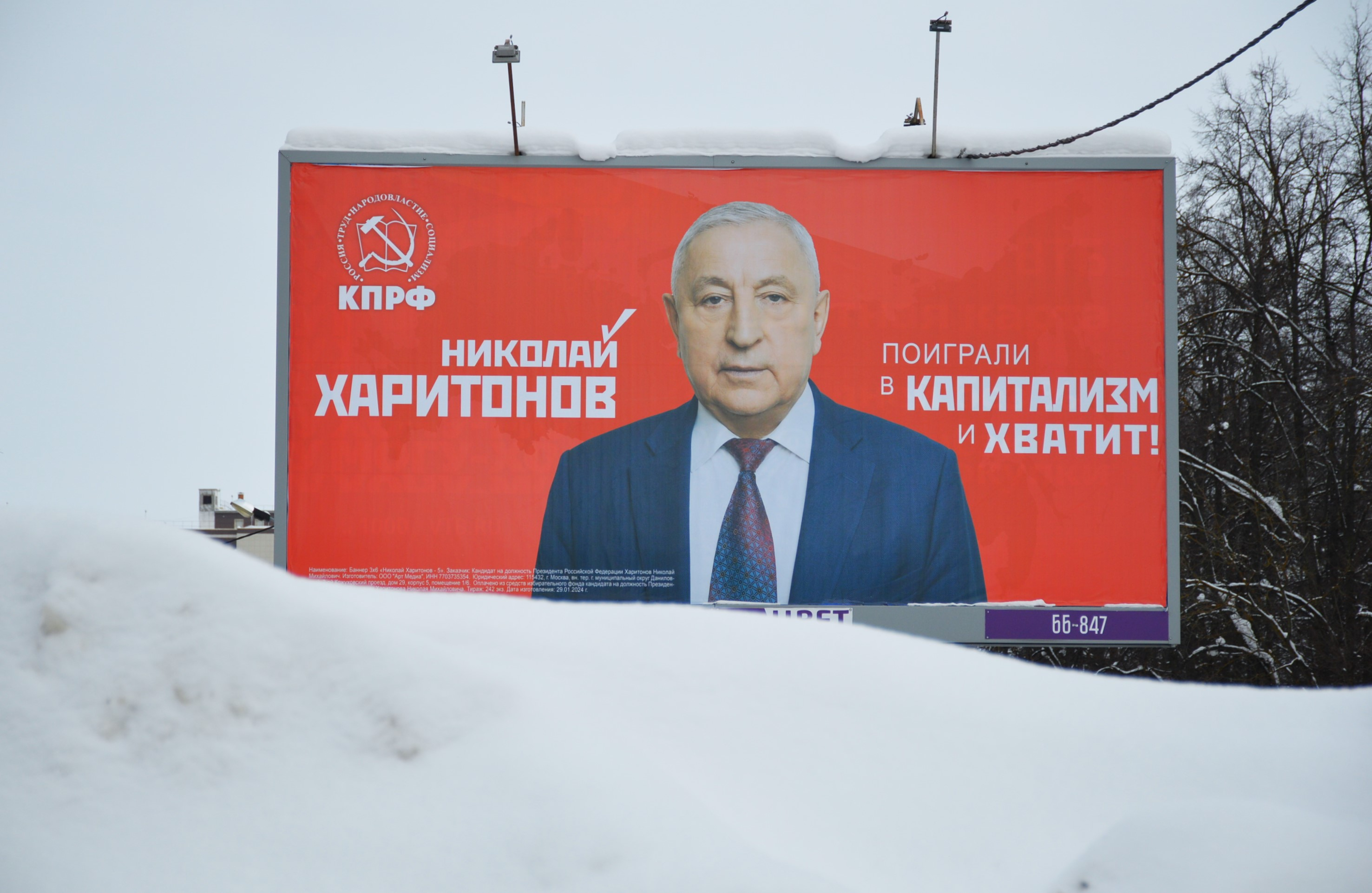
Nikolay Kharitonov on a billboard in Kazan

The 2024 presidential campaign of Nikolay Kharitonov, member of the State Duma, was announced on 23 December 2023, during the Communist Party's congress.

This was Nikolay Kharitonov's second presidential campaign. He had previously unsuccessfully run for President of Russia from the Communist Party in the 2004 election, in which he took 2nd place, receiving 13.8% of the vote.

At the age of 75, Kharitonov became the oldest Russian presidential candidate in history, breaking the record of 71-year-old Vladimir Zhirinovsky in the 2018 election. Had he been elected, Kharitonov would have become the oldest president of Russia in history, and by the end of his presidential term (in 2030), one of the oldest world leaders.

Kharitonov stated shortly after his nomination that, during the election campaign, he would not be criticising incumbent president Vladimir Putin, who later entered and won the election.

== Nomination ==
Nikolay Kharitonov's candidacy for the presidential nomination from the Communist Party was proposed on 22 December 2023, during a meeting of the plenum of the Central Committee of the party. Besides him, the regional branches of the party also proposed the party leader Gennady Zyuganov, Oryol Oblast Governor Andrey Klychkov and former Irkutsk Oblast Governor Sergey Levchenko.

At the Congress of the Communist Party, held on 23 December 2023, Kharitonov was the only candidate for the presidential nomination. 175 out of 188 delegates of the congress voted for his nomination and 6 delegates voted against.

== Campaign ==
On 16 January 2024, Kharitonov, arrived on a three-day visit to the Khabarovsk Krai. During the visit, Kharitonov met with local residents, university students and representatives of public organizations.

On 18 January 2024, the Communist Party held a press conference at which Kharitonov's election campaign was presented. According to the presented program, Kharitonov proposes a change in socio-economic policy, the development of industrial and agricultural sectors and new industrialization, which requires the nationalization of the mineral resource base. Kharitonov also advocates the introduction of a progressive scale of taxation.

Kharitonov's team has launched a campaign website, but as of 10 February 2024 it is still "under construction".

Kharitonov campaigned for the total abolition of capitalism within Russia, stating that “We’ve played capitalism, and that’s enough!”

== Campaign organizations ==
After Kharitonov's nomination, Communist Party leader Gennady Zyuganov announced that he would head his staff. According to Zyuganov, he will manage the election campaign.

== Reaction ==
A number of Communist Party supporters criticized Kharitonov's nomination, viewing him as a weak candidate. Thus, the leader of the Movement for New Socialism, Nikolay Platoshkin, stated that Kharitonov's candidacy was put forward without coordination with the movement and therefore would not be supported by it. The leader of the Left Front, Sergei Udaltsov, criticized Kharitonov's nomination, calling such a decision weaker in terms of competitiveness.

A number of political scientists, such as Konstantin Kalachev, Ilya Grashchenkov and Alexander Rudakov, expressed the opinion that Kharitonov's nomination could lead to the loss of a stable second place in the elections for the Communist party.

== Results ==
Results of Kharitonov by federal subject.

Kharitonov got 3,768,470 votes or 4.37%.
