= Davankov =

Davankov (masculine, Russian: Даванков) or Davankova (feminine, Russian: Даванкова) is a Russian surname. Notable people with the surname include:

- Vasilisa Davankova (born 1998), Russian YouTuber, blogger, ice dancer, and pair skater
- Vladislav Davankov (born 1984), Russian politician
