= Vladislav Davankov 2024 presidential campaign =

Russian political campaign

- Campaign: 2024 Russian presidential election
- Candidate: Vladislav Davankov; Deputy Chairman of the State Duma (2021–present day); Member of the State Duma (2021–present day)
- Affiliation: New People
- Status: Announced and nominee: 24 December 2023; Lost election: 17 March 2024
- Key people: Chief of the Public Headquarters: Sardana Avksentyeva; Co-chairman of the Public Headquarters: Stanislav Druzhinin
- Slogan(s): ДА ПЕРЕМЕНАМ! (YES TO CHANGES!)

Website
- davankov2024.ru

The 2024 presidential campaign of Vladislav Davankov, deputy chairman of the State Duma was announced on 24 December 2023, during the New People party's congress.

== Background ==
The New People party was created in 2020 by Russian businessman Alexey Nechayev. In 2021, the party participated in the legislative election for the first time and was able to gain 5.3% of the vote, gaining 13 seats in the State Duma. Vladislav Davankov was elected deputy chairman of the State Duma from the party.

Davankov did not publicly announce his participation in the elections, which is why the name of the candidate was not known before the party congress. At the end of 2022, there were rumors about the possible nomination by the New People party of former Finance Minister Alexei Kudrin as a presidential candidate. The possibility of Kudrin's nomination for president was not ruled out by party leader Alexei Nechaev.

In early December 2023, the New People's press service announced that the party was considering three candidates for the presidential nomination, namely Vladislav Davankov, State Duma deputy and former mayor of Yakutsk Sardana Avksentyeva and party leader Alexey Nechayev.

In 2023, Vladislav Davankov was a candidate for Mayor of Moscow. In the election held in September 2023, Davankov took 4th place, gaining 5.3% of the vote.

== Nomination ==
Vladislav Davankov was officially nominated as a presidential candidate at the congress of the New People Party, held on 24 December 2023. All 69 delegates voted for him.

Davankov was also endorsed by the Party of Growth, whose congress was held on the same day. Both parties have been part of a bloc called the Union of Progressive Political Forces since June 2023. In addition, at the congress of the New People party, the beginning of the process of uniting the two parties was officially announced.

== Campaign ==
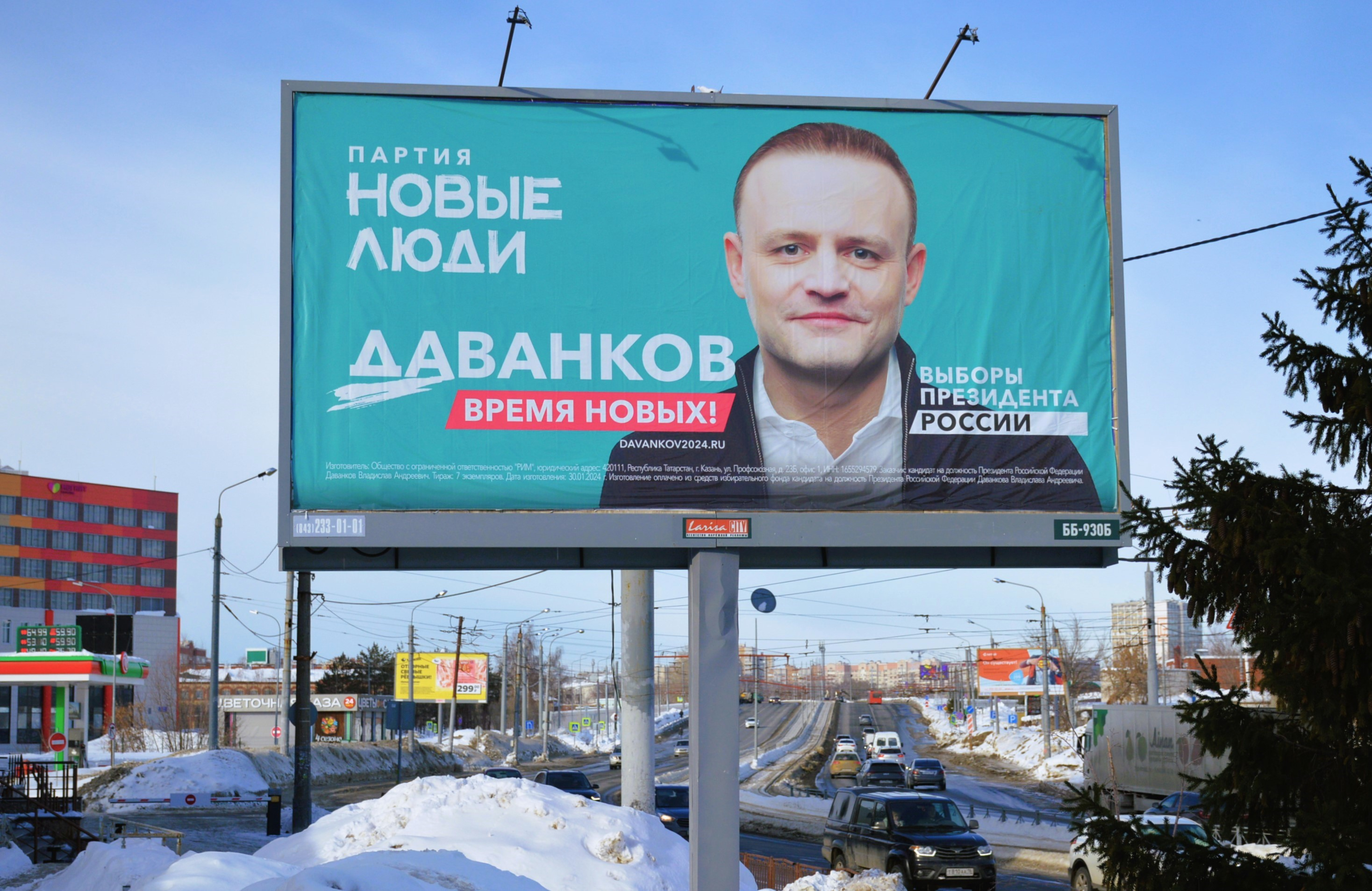
Vladislav Davankov on a billboard in Kazan

Immediately after his nomination, Davankov made a speech in which he stated that the basis of his presidential program would be the expansion of civil and business freedoms and the fight against new prohibitions and restrictions. As part of the campaign, Davankov plans to visit about 30 cities to communicate with citizens and present them with his vision of what Russia should be like.

During his campaign, Davankov does not plan to criticise his opponents, claiming that criticising political opponents is “a thing of the past”.

On 15 February 2024, Davankov released his electoral manifesto, calling for 'peace and negotiations' in regards to the Russian invasion of Ukraine. He proposed ending government censorship, describing it as "cancel culture", and compared it to "the worst Soviet repression”. He said that while those who are actively calling for the destruction of Russia should be prosecuted and punished, those who merely have a critical opinion should not be. He criticised these "repressive norms" used to persecute those who are opposed to the regime, and also advocates guaranteeing journalists immunity from prosecution in order to protect press freedoms. Independent Russian newspaper Novaya Gazeta observed that Davankov's policy promises "appeared to confirm his status as the most liberal candidate on the ballot", although he had previously voiced his support for the invasion of Ukraine and had helped introduce a law change making it illegal for transgender people to medically transition.

The Centre for European Policy Analysis observed that Davankov would provide an outlet for sceptics of the war in Ukraine after the rejection of the anti-war candidate Boris Nadezhdin. The Kremlin reportedly feared Davankov's candidacy in the election and his youthfulness compared to Putin, and so had unsuccessfully tried to interfere and get an "older and less charismatic stand-in" to replace him. A state-run poll showed Davankov second after Putin in the election race, and the CEPA observed that "should Nadezhdin’s followers come out and push Davankov above 10%, the Kremlin may very well find itself having to recalibrate its propaganda about the war, at the very least". The Carnegie Endowment for International Peace said that Davankov's campaign may also pose Putin difficulties as he is a youthful 'newbie' who may attract interest from voters as a fresh face and negatively draw attention to the advanced age of 71-year-old Putin.

Davankov has been described as "the most likely to become the alternative-to-Putin candidate".

Davankov is also campaigning for economic decentralisation and modernisation, and an increase in money for the education and health budgets.

== Campaign organizations ==
On 24 December 2023, the day Davankov was nominated for president, it was announced that Sardana Avksentyeva would head the public support headquarters.

Stanislav Druzhinin, an entrepreneur and public figure, President of the Russian Diving Federation, became the co-chairman of the public headquarters. Druzhinin is an adviser to Davankov and in 2023 was the head of his staff at the Moscow mayoral election.

== Results ==
Results of Davankov by federal subject.

Davankov got 3,362,484 votes or 3.90%.
