= 2024 Russian presidential election =

- 15–17 March 2024 (Note: Early voting had taken place from 26 February in several remote regions of the Russian Far East as well as occupied territories of Ukraine.)
- Registered: 113,011,059
- Turnout: 77.49% (▲9.99pp)
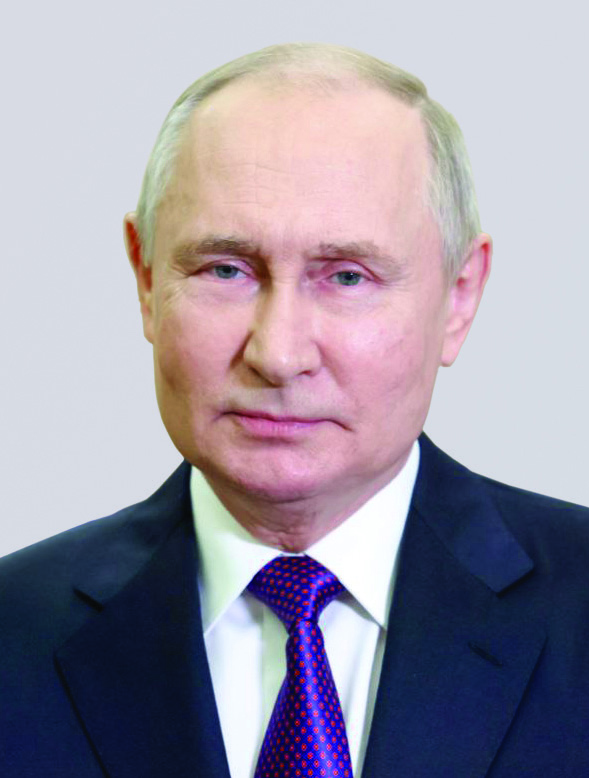

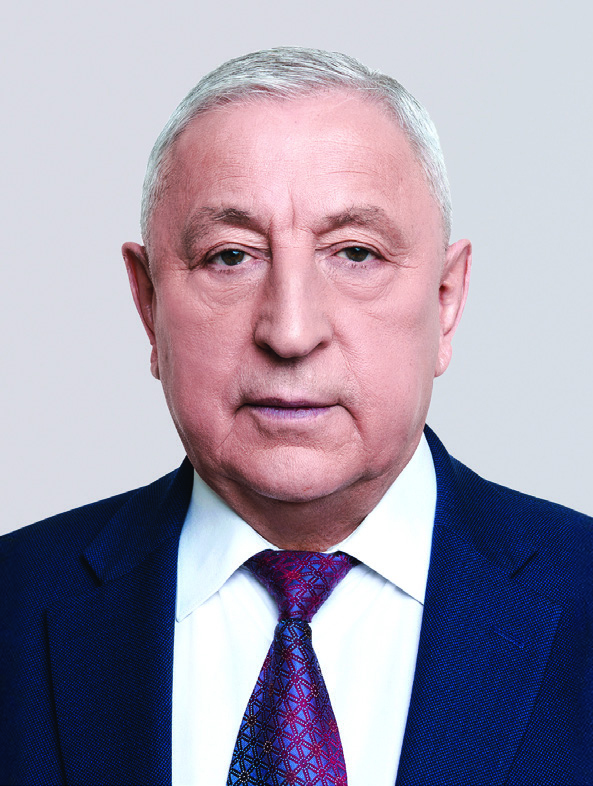
Nominee	Vladimir Putin	Nikolay Kharitonov
Party	Independent (Note: Supported by the People's Front, United Russia, A Just Russia – For Truth, Rodina, Russian Party of Pensioners for Social Justice, Party of Business, Russian All-People's Union, and Democratic Party of Russia)	CPRF
Alliance	NF
Popular vote	76,277,708	3,768,470
Percentage	88.48%	4.37%
- Official results by federal subject
President before election
Vladimir Putin
Independent
Elected President
Vladimir Putin
Independent

Election logo

Presidential elections were held in Russia from 15 to 17 March 2024. It was the eighth presidential election in the country. The incumbent president Vladimir Putin won with 88% of the vote, the highest percentage in a presidential election in post-Soviet Russia, gaining a fifth term in what was widely viewed as a foregone conclusion. He was inaugurated on 7 May 2024.

In November 2023, Boris Nadezhdin, a former member of the State Duma, became the first person backed by a registered political party to announce his candidacy, running on an anti-war platform. He was followed by incumbent and independent candidate Vladimir Putin in December 2023, who was eligible to seek re-election as a result of the 2020 constitutional amendments. Later the same month, Leonid Slutsky of the Liberal Democratic Party, Nikolay Kharitonov of the Communist Party and Vladislav Davankov of New People announced their candidacies.

Other candidates also declared their candidacy but were barred for various reasons by the Central Election Commission (CEC). As was the case in the 2018 presidential election, the most prominent opposition leader, Alexei Navalny, was barred from running due to a prior criminal conviction seen as politically motivated. Navalny died in prison in February 2024, weeks before the election, under suspicious circumstances. Nadezhdin, despite passing the initial stages of the process, on 8 February 2024, was also barred from running. The decision was announced at a special CEC session, citing alleged irregularities in the signatures of voters supporting his candidacy. Nadezhdin's status as the only explicitly anti-war candidate was widely regarded as the real reason for his disqualification, although Davankov promised "peace and negotiations on our own terms". As a result, Putin faced no credible opposition. Anti-Putin activists called on voters to spoil their ballot. The elections saw 1.4 million invalid or blank ballots cast, around 1.6% of all votes cast, a 45 percent increase compared to the 2018 elections.

Most international observers did not expect the election to be either free or fair, with Putin having increased political repressions after launching his full-scale war with Ukraine in 2022. The elections were also held in the Russian-occupied territories of Ukraine, as well as in Moldova's Russian-occupied region of Transnistria. In the election, there were reports of irregularities, including ballot stuffing and coercion, with statistical analysis suggesting unprecedented levels of fraud.

== Eligibility ==
According to clause 3 of article 81 of the Constitution of Russia, prior to the 2020 constitutional revision, the same person could not hold the position of President of the Russian Federation for more than two consecutive terms, which allowed Vladimir Putin to become president in 2012 for a third term not consecutive with his prior terms. Until the reform, the prospect of these term limits forcing Putin from office was widely discussed as the 2024 problem. The constitutional reform established a hard limit of two terms overall. However, terms served before the constitutional revision do not count, which gives Putin eligibility for two more presidential terms until 2036.

According to the new version of the Constitution, presidential candidates must:

- Be at least 35 years old (the requirement has not changed);
- Be a resident in Russia for at least 25 years (previously 10 years);
- Not have foreign citizenship or residence permit in a foreign country, neither at the time of the election nor at any time before (new requirement).

== Candidates ==
The individuals below appeared on the ballot.

Name, age, political party	Experience	Home region	Campaign	Details	Registration date
Vladislav Davankov (40); New People	Deputy Chairman of the State Duma (2021–present); Member of the State Duma (2021–present)	Moscow	(Campaign • Website)	Davankov was nominated by his party in December 2023 during the party's congress. He was also supported by Party of Growth, which announced that it would merge with New People. Davankov submitted documents to participate in the election on 25 December 2023 and 1 January 2024.	5 January 2024
Vladimir Putin (71); Independent	Incumbent President of Russia (2000–2008 and 2012–present); Prime Minister of Russia (1999–2000 and 2008–2012); FSB Director (1998–1999)	Moscow	(Campaign • Website)	During a ceremony to award soldiers in December 2023, Putin announced that he would participate in the election. He is supported by United Russia and A Just Russia – For Truth, among others. Putin submitted documents to participate in the election on 18 December 2023, which were registered on 20 December. The CEC analyzed 60,000 signatures out of the 315,000 submitted by Putin, and found that only 91 (0.15%) were invalid, which is significantly below the 5% threshold.	29 January 2024
Leonid Slutsky (56); Liberal Democratic Party	Leader of the Liberal Democratic Party of Russia (2022–present); Member of the State Duma (1999–present)	Moscow	(Campaign • Website)	Slutsky was nominated by his party in December 2023 during the party's congress. He submitted documents to the CEC on 25 December 2023 and 1 January 2024.	5 January 2024
Nikolay Kharitonov (75); Communist Party	Member of the State Duma (1993–present)	Krasnodar Krai	(Campaign)	Kharitonov was nominated by his party in December 2023 during the party's congress. He previously ran in the 2004 presidential election and came second with 13.7% of the vote. Kharitonov submitted documents to participate in the election on 27 December 2023 and 3 January 2024.	9 January 2024

=== Rejected candidates ===
Individuals in this section have had their document submissions accepted by the CEC to register their participation, and later gathered the necessary signatures from voters. The deadline to submit documents was 27 December 2023 for independents and 1 January 2024 for party-based nominations, with the commission already announcing the rejection of some candidates based on alleged issues with their paperwork.

Towards the deadline to submit documents, the CEC stated that 33 potential candidates were intending to be registered as candidates (24 independents and 9 party-based nominations). The commission accepted the documents of 15 candidates.

The next step was to collect signatures by 31 January 2024. Independents had to gather 300,000 signatures from the public in at least 40 of Russia's federal subjects to support their participation and thereby be included on the ballot, while potential candidates nominated by political parties that are not represented in the State Duma or in at least a third of the country's regional parliaments had to gather 100,000 signatures.

Vladimir Putin was the first to achieve this, having gathered more than half a million signatures by 30 December; by 17 January he had gathered 2.5 million signatures. He was followed by Davankov, Kharitonov, Slutsky, Nadezhdin and Malinkovich (in no particular order). Others either failed to achieve this or withdrew from the process.

The CEC accepted the signatures of Putin, while rejecting Nadezhdin and Malinkovich on the basis of what it described to be irregularities. Davankov, Kharitonov and Slutsky were not required to collect signatures as they were nominated by political parties represented in the State Duma. This confirmed the final number of candidates at four.

Rejected candidates
Potential candidate's name, age, political party	Experience	Home region	Campaign	Details	Signatures collected
Sergey Malinkovich (48); Communists of Russia	Member of the Altai Krai Legislative Assembly (2021–present); Chairman of the Central Committee of the Communists of Russia (2022–present)	Altai Krai	(Campaign)	On 28 December 2023, Malinkovich was nominated as the candidate for his party. He submitted documents to register with the CEC on 1 January 2024. On 2 February, the CEC informed Malinkovich that it had found deficiencies in the signatures he had submitted.	Signatures collected 104,998 / 105,000 Signatures accepted 96,019 / 105,000
Boris Nadezhdin (60); Civic Initiative	Member of the Dolgoprudny City Council (1990–1997, 2019–present); Founder and President of the Institute of Regional Projects and Legislation Foundation (2001–present); Member of the State Duma (1999–2003)	Moscow Oblast	(Campaign • Website)	On 31 October 2023, Nadezhdin announced that he would run from the Civic Initiative party. On 26 December he submitted registration documents to the CEC, which were registered on 28 December. On 8 February 2024, the CEC announced that more than 5% of the signatures it had reviewed were invalid and therefore could not register him as a candidate. Nadezhdin subsequently appealed the decision at Russia's Supreme Court.	Signatures collected 105,000 / 105,000 Signatures accepted 95,587 / 105,000 Supreme Court appeals Case 1 (Note: The case deals with CEC's refusal to register Nadezhdin as a candidate for the election and seeks his direct reinstating.): Initial case submitted on 16 February 2024, and rejected on 21 February; Appeal submitted on 26 February, and rejected on 4 March.; Cases 2 & 3 (Note: The two cases are concerned on CEC's apparent procedural faults while checking the selected signatures. If both cases were upheld, Nadezhdin would have enough valid signatures to be reinstated as a candidate.): Initial cases submitted on 12 February 2024, and rejected on 15 February; Appeals submitted on 19 February, and rejected on 26 February

== Party congresses and primaries ==
Congresses of political parties are held after the official appointment of election. At the congress, a party can either nominate its own candidate, or support a candidate nominated by another party or an independent candidate. Twelve parties held party congresses in December 2023, at which candidates were either nominated or endorsed.

Party	Congress date	Venue	Nominee	Reference
United Russia	17 December 2023	VDNKh, Moscow	Endorsement of Vladimir Putin	
Liberal Democratic Party	19 December 2023	Crocus Expo, Krasnogorsk, Moscow Oblast	Leonid Slutsky	
Civic Initiative	23 December 2023	Moscow	Boris Nadezhdin	
Communist Party	23 December 2023	Snegiri wellness complex, Rozhdestveno, Moscow Oblast	Nikolay Kharitonov	
A Just Russia – For Truth	23 December 2023	Holiday Inn Sokolniki, Moscow	Endorsement of Vladimir Putin	
Party of Social Protection	23 December 2023	Moscow	Vladimir Mikhailov	
Russian All-People's Union	23 December 2023	Moscow	Sergey Baburin (Declined; endorsed Vladimir Putin)	
Party of Growth	24 December 2023	Moscow State University, Moscow	Vladislav Davankov	
New People	24 December 2023	Moscow State University, Moscow	Vladislav Davankov	
Russian Party of Freedom and Justice	24 December 2023	Moscow	Andrey Bogdanov	
Democratic Party of Russia	25 December 2023	Moscow	Irina Sviridova (Declined; endorsed Vladimir Putin)	
Communists of Russia	28 December 2023	Moscow	Sergey Malinkovich	

=== Other parties ===
At Yabloko's congress, which took place on 9 December 2023, somewhat unconventionally, the party decided that Grigory Yavlinsky would run for president as its nominee if he obtains 10 million signatures from potential voters, which is higher than the total number of votes Yavlinsky obtained during his most successful run for president (5.55 million). Yabloko later stated that it would not be nominating any candidate. Furthermore, Yavlinsky only managed to gather around a million signatures.

The Left Front stated that it would run a primary election between 22 candidates, but later announced it would not be holding the primary due to threats received from the police. Instead, the party called on their "comrades in the Communist Party" to vote for one of the following to be nominated at the party congress: Pavel Grudinin, Nikolai Bondarenko, Valentin Konovalov, Andrey Klychkov, Sergey Levchenko, Nina Ostanina, Igor Girkin.

== Preparation of public opinion ==
In June 2023, a few posters advocating for Yevgeny Prigozhin, leader of the Wagner Group private military company, were noticed in Krasnodar, with a QR code to a website hinting at the 2024 election. Prigozhin himself denied any relation to such posters and "any political activity in the internet", but fuelled speculation that he was about to go into politics after holding press conferences across Russia and leading the Wagner Group rebellion. He died in a plane crash later that year.

According to an investigation published in February 2024 by a coalition of journals including VSquare, Delfi, Expressen and Paper Trail Media, Putin ordered Decree Number 2016, titled "On deputy heads responsible for social and political work of federal government agencies", on 17 February 2023. The decree stated its aim of coordination between the Ministry of Education and Science and other state agencies to "increase the number of voters and the support of the main candidates" in the 2024 presidential election and other elections. Documents from a governmental "non-profit organisation", ANO Integration, highlighted the emphasis on increasing the number of voters and the support of the main candidates, with turnout being used to indicate the scale of support and opposition to Putin.

The ANO Integration documents presented a plan to create lists of all employees and sub-lists of opinion leaders in institutions within the ministry's responsibility, and to monitor political attitudes and voting preferences and "increas[e] [the employee's] level of socio-political literacy". The documents planned for the preparation of secret instructions for social events in which selected opinion leaders and "experts" would meet with students and teachers in preparation for the election. Martin Kragh of the Center for East European Studies in Stockholm described the documents by stating, "All these documents show how little the Kremlin believes that people might just spontaneously support the ruling party". Mark Galeotti, a British historian, lecturer and writer, described the process as "pre-rigging" the election in order to minimise the amount of manipulation needed in the numbers of votes cast for Putin in the election. He stated, "The Kremlin cannot even trust what mayors and governors tell them about the [political] situation in their region."

The election was seen as a foregone conclusion. When asked by a BBC journalist about his electoral campaign, Nikolay Kharitonov refused to answer why he thought he would be a better candidate than Putin, before proceeding to praise the latter for "trying to solve a lot of the problems of the 1990s" and consolidating the country for "victory in all areas". Shortly after filing his candidacy in December 2023, Leonid Slutsky said he did not "dream of beating Putin" and predicted that the latter would achieve "a huge victory". Vladislav Davankov said he would not criticize his political opponents. He also promised "peace and negotiations on our own terms".

== Conduct ==
=== Russian-occupied territories of Ukraine ===
Early voting opened on 26 February and lasted until 14 March to allow certain residents in remote areas in 37 federal subjects of Russia as well as in the regions of Ukraine that it annexed following its invasion in 2022 to vote. In the latter areas, a campaign called InformUIK was set up to encourage participation in the election, with its representatives going door-to-door escorted by armed men to compile voter lists and collect ballots from residences. A resident of Kherson Oblast described the elections in his area as a "comedy show", noting that households were being visited by "two locals – one holding a list of voters and the other a ballot box – and a military man with a machine gun".

Russian officials also used home visits by the mobile polling stations to monitor the population and find those participating in resistance activities or refusing to obtain Russian government documents. Reports also emerged of Russian-installed authorities coercing people to vote by withholding social benefits and healthcare treatment, while human rights activists said at least 27 Ukrainians were arrested for refusing to vote in Kherson and Zaporizhzhia Oblasts. Despite Russian electoral laws prohibiting those without Russian passports from voting, voters in occupied Ukraine were allowed to present any valid identification documents, including a Ukrainian passport or driving license. In Melitopol, Zaporizhzhia Oblast, soldiers armed with machine guns sealed off apartments being visited by mobile polling teams. In one instance, a man who fled his village near Mariupol, Donetsk Oblast, to Ukrainian-controlled territory following the Russian invasion alleged that his name appeared in Russian-produced voter lists and was listed as having voted for Putin by election officials.

=== Efforts to promote turnout ===
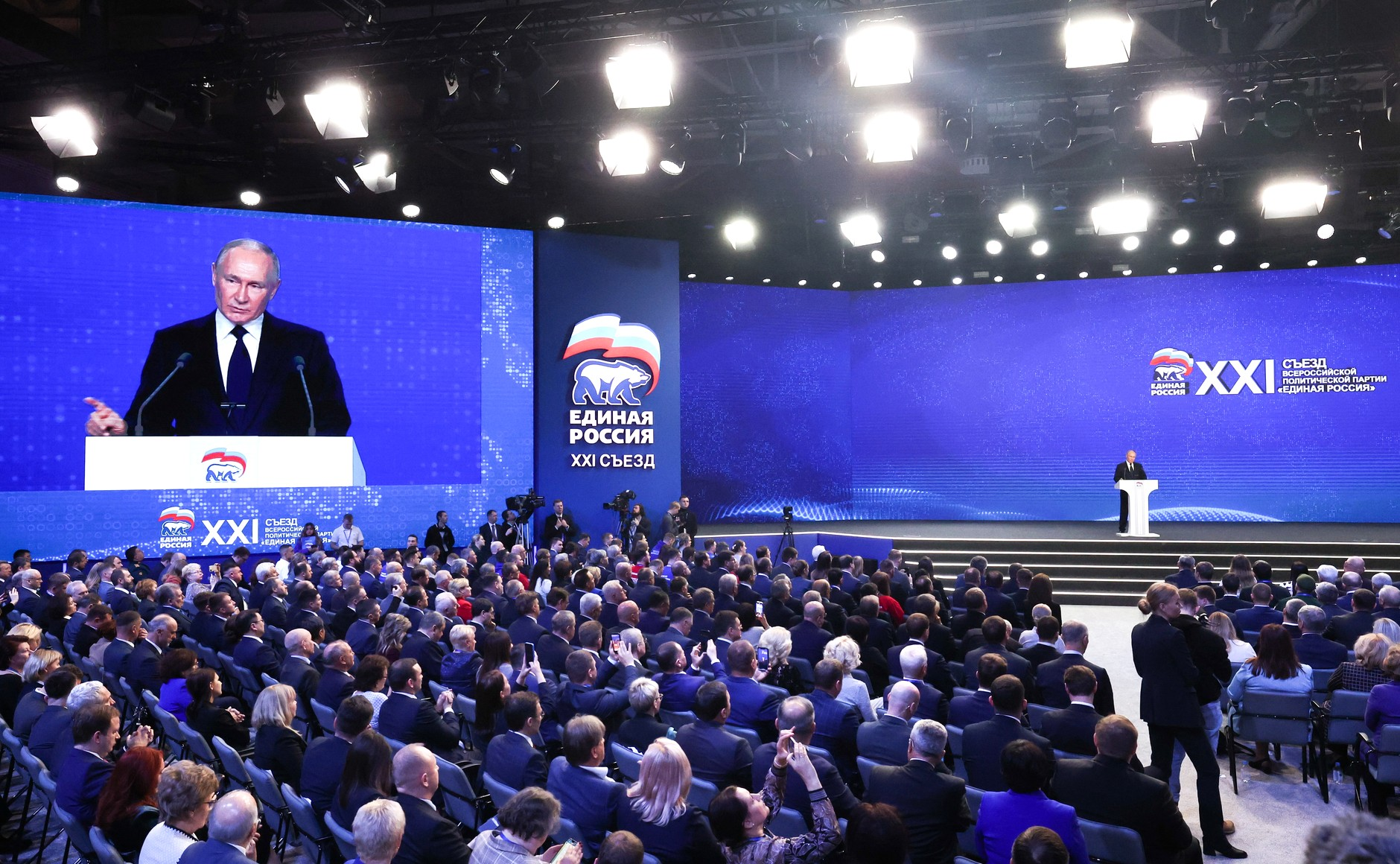
Vladimir Putin at the United Russia congress

On the eve of the first round of regular voting on 14 March, Putin called on citizens to vote in order to show their unity behind his leadership, saying in a video message that "We have already shown that we can be together, defending the freedom, sovereignty and security of Russia," and urged them "not to stray from this path".

Latvia-based Russian news outlet Meduza reported that Kremlin officials asked Russia's regional governments to secure 70% voter turnout and more than 80% support for Putin.

Civil servants and employees at state-run companies were ordered to vote. In Omsk, officials issued 50,000 free tickets at polling stations to first-time voters aged between 18 and 24 years of age for one Ferris wheel ride at an amusement park. In Altai Krai, voters were to be given a chance to win sanctioned goods and appliances such as an iPhone in a raffle, provided that they upload pictures on VKontakte showing them at polling stations. In Strezhevoy, Tomsk Oblast, the mayor promised free bread rolls and porridge to voters. In Sverdlovsk Oblast, authorities set up an election day trivia quiz about the region's history with and offered 2,000 smartphones, 45 apartments, 20 motorcycles, and 100 Moskvich cars as prizes, but said that correct answers would not guarantee a win. In Tatarstan, officials set a music festival in Kazan on 17 March that would be open to visitors upon presentation of a bracelet obtained at polling stations that would also guarantee free and unlimited access to public transportation, along with a chance to win in a raffle with three Lada Vesta cars at stake.

Reports also emerged of pressure being exerted by authorities on students and young people to vote. Students at a construction college in Perm Krai were ordered to vote inside the campus, with the school administration pledging to monitor turnout using video surveillance cameras. At Tula State Pedagogical University, students were required to submit a photo of their ballot to prove that they voted. Its rector had also publicly endorsed Putin. At Voronezh State Pedagogical University, students said they were required to inform authorities about who they were voting for.

=== Regular voting ===
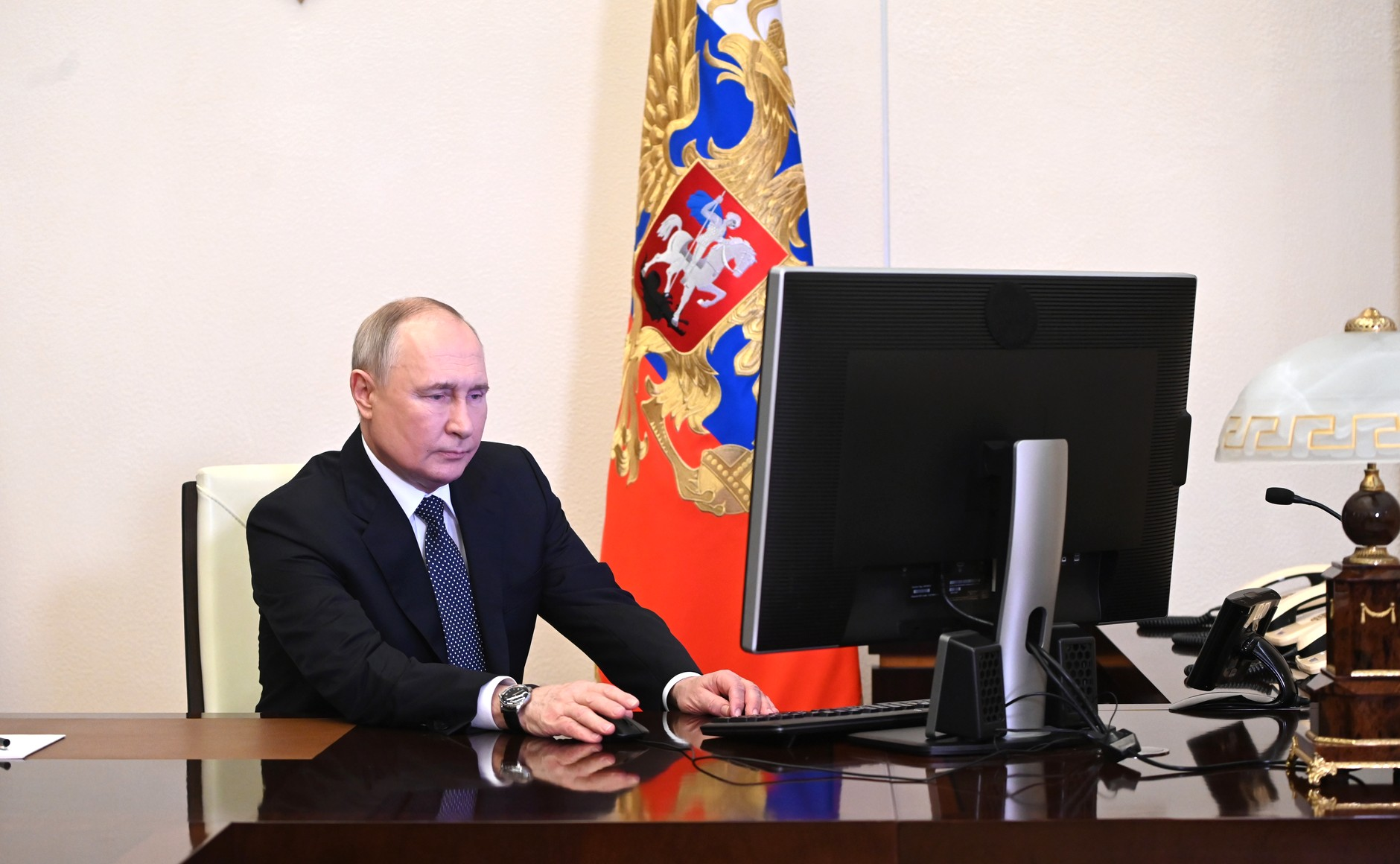
Putin voted in the Russian presidential election online.

On the regular election days, polls opened at 08:00 local time in Kamchatka Krai on 15 March and are expected to close at 20:00 local time in Kaliningrad Oblast on 17 March. Independent watchdogs were prevented from observing the conduct of the election, as only registered candidates and state-backed advisory bodies were allowed to send observers to polling stations. The independent election monitor Golos described the election as the "most vapid" since the 2000 election, noting that campaigning was "practically unnoticeable" and that authorities were "doing everything" to prevent people noticing that an election was taking place while state media provided less airtime to the election compared to 2018. It also described Putin's campaign as disguised by his activities as president, while his registered opponents were "demonstrably passive".

On 15 March, the Kremlin published images of Putin casting his vote online using a computer in his office. On the morning of the same day, the online voting system went down temporarily, with Golos and other independent electoral observers attributing the outage to the traffic generated by votes coming from workplaces.

== Allegations of fraud ==
=== Statistical analyses ===
According to a Novaya Gazeta investigation using a method proposed by mathematician Sergey Shpilkin, around 22 million of the non-online (polling booth) votes for Putin were falsified, out of 64.7 million non-online votes for Putin in total. Novaya Gazeta described the analysis showing "record levels of fraud even for a Russian presidential election".

Meduza carried out statistical analyses on the official results released by the CEC. Based on scatter plots of the vote percentage for Putin compared to turnout, a tail in which voter turnout visually correlates to Putin support, which appeared weakly in earlier Russian presidential elections, was found by Meduza to completely dominate in 2024. "Churov's saw", a statistical effect interpreted as fraudulent in which sharp peaks at round numbers appear in voter turnout and percentage votes for Putin, was found by Meduza to have strengthened in the 2024 election, with Meduza arguing that the number of polling stations with likely fraud became the majority in 2024, while earlier the fraction of fraudulent polling stations had been a minority. Overall, Meduza stated that the 2024 presidential election "was almost certainly the most fraudulent" in "modern Russian history", and that the "sheer magnitude of fraud eclipses that of 2018".

=== Other incidents of fraud ===
On 16 March, Golos released a video on social media appearing to show staff at a polling station in Krasnodar doing ballot stuffing. It also said that it had received reports of attempts to inspect filled-out ballots before they were cast, and one instance in which police demanded a ballot box be opened to remove a ballot. Thermochromic ink that disappears when heated was also allegedly used in Kursk and Rostov-on-Don on 15 March. The usage of such ink was previously reported during the 2021 regional elections in Khimki. Overall, Golos described the 2024 election as an "imitation", adding that it had not previously observed "a presidential campaign that fell so short of constitutional standards".

== Incidents ==
=== Attacks by Ukrainian and other armed groups ===
Attacks have been launched against Russian electoral institutions in occupied areas of Ukraine. On the first day of early voting on 27 February 2024, two bombs were detonated at the local offices of the United Russia party and near a polling station in Nova Kakhovka, Kherson Oblast. On 6 March, a local official of the Russian Central Election Commission in Berdiansk, Zaporizhzhia Oblast, was killed by a car bomb, according to Ukrainian officials. When asked about the killing, the Ukrainian-appointed governor of the oblast, Ivan Fedorov, attributed the attack to "our resistance", adding that they were linked to Ukrainian secret services and that "it is abnormal when our citizens collaborate with Russians". On 15 March, an improvised explosive device was detonated inside a trash can in front of a polling station in Skadovsk, Kherson Oblast, injuring five Russian soldiers. On 16 March, the Russian-installed governor of Kherson Oblast, Vladimir Saldo claimed that one person was killed and four others were injured in a Ukrainian drone strike in Kakhovka, which he claimed was an attempt to disrupt voting, while TASS reported that a Ukrainian drone struck a polling station in Zaporizhzhia Oblast.

During an incursion into Kursk and Belgorod Oblasts on 12 March, the Sibir Battalion, an armed Russian opposition group based in Ukraine, published a video condemning the elections, saying that "Ballots and polling stations in this case are fiction." A member of the Freedom of Russia Legion, which also participated in the attacks, acknowledged that they were "timed with the so-called elections" and referred to it as a "voting method". Putin also described the incursion as an attempt to "disrupt" the election and "interfere with the normal process of expressing the will of citizens". Throughout the election, the border city of Belgorod was subjected to shelling and rocket attacks by Ukraine, killing two people in what most analysts believed to be an attempt to disrupt the vote and incite discontent against Putin by convincing Russians of his responsibility in bringing the war on Ukraine to Russian soil by launching the invasion in the first place, although the high turnout of 78 percent in Belgorod Oblast suggested that the strategy had led to increased support for Putin.

On 25 March, the independent news outlet Mediazona reported that the Federal Security Service had arrested three people on suspicion of plotting an arson attack against a Putin campaign office in Barnaul, Altai Krai, prior to the election. One of the suspects was said to have been in contact with an "unidentified terrorist organization".

=== Incidents involving civilians ===
During regular polling, several election-related incidents were reported across the country, resulting in at least 13 arrests, seven of which were for pouring liquid substances on ballot boxes and four for committing acts of arson in polling stations, one of which involved a woman in Saint Petersburg who was arrested for throwing a molotov cocktail at a school hosting two polling stations after having allegedly been promised a financial incentive by a "Ukrainian Telegram channel". A voting booth was also set on fire in Moscow. In Podolsk, Moscow Oblast, a voter was charged with "discrediting the Russian army" and fined 30,000 rubles ($342) after spoiling her ballot by writing an unspecified message. A voter in Saint Petersburg was ordered arrested on similar charges after writing the words "No to War" on her ballot. Some voters uploaded images of them spoiling their ballots by writing messages such as "killer and thief" and "waiting for you in The Hague", a reference to the arrest warrant issued by the International Criminal Court against Putin over war crimes in Ukraine.

On 17 March, a Moldovan national was arrested after throwing two molotov cocktails at the grounds of the Russian embassy in Chișinău, which was being used as a polling station for Russian nationals in Moldova. Moldovan police said that the man, who also claimed to be carrying Russian citizenship, "justified his action by some dissatisfaction he has with the actions of the Russian authorities".

In response to the attacks on polling stations, former president and deputy chair of the Security Council of Russia Dmitry Medvedev called for charges of treason to be filed against those who vandalize polling stations for attempting to derail the vote amid the fighting in Ukraine.

=== Cyberattacks ===
On 16 March, the United Russia party said its website was targeted by a cyberattack.

== Opinion polls ==

After nominations of potential candidates
Fieldwork date	Polling firm						Others	Undecided	Abstention
Fieldwork date	Polling firm	Putin	~~Nadezhdin~~	Kharitonov	Slutsky	Davankov	Others	Undecided	Abstention
6–10 Mar 2024	IRPZ	55.9%	Rejected	5.2%	3.2%	9.1%	3.1%	19.5%	4%
6–10 Mar 2024	CIPKR	55%	Rejected	5%	4%	4%	1%	—	30%
4–6 Mar 2024	FOM	56%	Rejected	4%	4%	3%	3%	—	30%
4 March 2024	VCIOM	56.2%	Rejected	3%	2.25%	4.5%	—	—	25%
1–5 Mar 2024	ExtremeScan	57%	Rejected	3%	1%	3%	2%	22%	12%
1–5 Mar 2024	CIPKR	61%	Rejected	6%	3%	5%	6%	4%	15%
26 Feb – 5 March 2024	IRPZ	56.2%	Rejected	3.2%	2%	5.6%	1.5%	31%	0.1%
1–4 Mar 2024	Russian Field	66%	Rejected	5%	4%	6%	0.4%	5%	14%
2–3 Mar 2024	VCIOM	60%	Rejected	3%	2%	5%	2%	17%	11%
10–18 Feb 2024	CIPKR	62%	Rejected	6%	3%	4%	7%	5%	13%
16 Feb 2024	Alexei Navalny dies while serving a 19-year prison sentence								
15 February 2024	VCIOM	61%	Rejected	3%	2%	3%	2%	17%	13%
14 February 2024	VCIOM	64%	Rejected	4%	3%	5%	2%	2%	2%
9-11 Feb 2024	FOM	74%	Rejected	3%	3%	2%	1%	10%	5%
8 February 2024	VCIOM	57%	Rejected	3%	3%	4%	2%	18%	14%
8 Feb 2024	Central Election Commission bars Nadezhdin from participating in the elections								
1–7 Feb 2024	ExtremeScan	63%	6%	—	—	—	8%	12%	11%
27–30 Jan 2024	Russian Field	62.2%	7.8%	2.3%	1.9%	1.0%	2.5%	7.8%	12.8%
25–30 Jan 2024	ExtremeScan	61%	6%	2%	1%	—	2%	17%	11%
11–28 Jan 2024	CIPKR	60%	7%	4%	3%	0.3%	3%	7%	15%

Before the start of nominations of potential candidates
Fieldwork date	Polling firm																			Others	Undecided	Abstention
Fieldwork date	Polling firm	Putin	Grudinin	Zyuganov	~~Zhirinovsky~~	Slutsky	~~Navalny~~	Shoigu	Lavrov	Medvedev	Sobyanin	Dyumin	Volodin	Mishustin	~~Furgal~~	Platoshkin	Bondarenko	Mironov	~~Prigozhin~~	Others	Undecided	Abstention
Dec 2023	VCIOM	42.7%	1.6%	3.8%	Deceased	—	1.2%	8.7%	14.3%	—	—	—	2.9%	18.8%	—	0.7%	0.8%	1.8%	Deceased	1.2%	37.2%	
Nov 2023	VCIOM	37.3%	1.4%	3.0%	Deceased	—	1.3%	8%	15.4%	—	—	—	2.7%	16.6%	—	0.8%	0.8%	1.7%	Deceased	1.3%	42%	
23–29 Nov 2023	Levada Center	58.0%	0.5%	1.3%	Deceased	0.5%	—	—	0.3%	0.2%	0.3%	—	—	0.5%	—	—	0.2%	0.4%	Deceased	0.8%	31.9%	4.8%
Oct 2023	VCIOM	37.3%	1.7%	3.0%	Deceased	—	1.4%	7.2%	15.3%	—	—	—	3.1%	15.6%	—	0.7%	0.9%	1.6%	Deceased	1.7%	42.2%	
Sep 2023	VCIOM	36%	1.4%	3.6%	Deceased	—	1.8%	7.3%	14.7%	—	—	—	2.7%	15.3%	—	0.7%	0.9%	1.7%	Deceased	1.8%	42.9%	
2–10 Sep 2023	Russian Field	29.9%	1.3%	0.6%	Deceased	—	1.7%	0.5%	0.6%	—	0.6%	—	—	1.1%	—	0.6%	—	—	Deceased	23.6%	32.2%	6.4%
Aug 2023	VCIOM	35.5%	1.5%	3.4%	Deceased	—	1.7%	7.1%	12.6%	—	—	—	3.2%	15.4%	—	0.7%	0.7%	1.7%	Deceased	1.7%	43.9%	
23 Aug 2023	Wagner Group plane crash including leader Yevgeny Prigozhin died in a crash																					
1–9 Aug 2023	CIPKR	60%	4%	2%	Deceased		4%	2%	—	1%	—	—		3%	—	—	—		—	11%	7%	3%
Jul 2023	VCIOM	37.1%	1.3%	3.2%	Deceased	—	1.5%	6.9%	13.9%	—	—	—	3.0%	16.8%	—	0.8%	0.8%	1.7%	—	2.0%	42.1%	
20–26 Jul 2023	Levada Center	44%	—	3%	Deceased		1%	7%	13%	3%	4%	—		18%	—	—	—		—	7%	19%	5.9%
Jun 2023	VCIOM	37.1%	1.4%	3.4%	Deceased	—	1.7%	8.9%	14.1%				3.4%	15.5%	—	0.8%	0.5%	1.7%		1.9%	41.4%	
22–28 Jun 2023	Levada Center	42%	—	4%	Deceased		—	8%	14%	4%	4%	—		18%	—	—	—		2%	5%		
23–24 Jun 2023	Wagner Group rebellion																					
May 2023	VCIOM	37.1%	1.2%	3.9%	Deceased	—	1.3%	10.0%	14.7%				3.2%	15.5%		0.7%	0.8%	2.0%		1.7%	41.2%	
13–16 May 2023	Russian Field	30.2%	1.1%	—	Deceased		2.8%	0.4%	0.5%	0.3%	0.8%	—		0.4%	1.1%	0.5%	0.4%		3%	26.4%	28.8%	5.9%
Apr 2023	VCIOM	38.7%	1.4%	3.6%	Deceased	—	1.2%	12.1%	17.6%				2.8%	16.5%		0.9%	0.8%	2.3%		1.7%	39.3%	
Mar 2023	VCIOM	38.7%	1.3%	3.7%	Deceased	—	1.6%	11.5%	16.3%				3.2%	17.4%		0.8%	0.8%	2.2%		2.2%	39.6%	
Feb 2023	VCIOM	37.5%	1.4%	4.4%	Deceased	—	1.8%	11.2%	16.3%				3.2%	14.3%		0.9%	0.8%	2.6%		2.0%	39.8%	
21–28 Feb 2023	Levada Center	43%	1%	5%	Deceased		1%	12%	15%	3%	3%	—		17%	1%	—	—		—	6%	17%	16%
Jan 2023	VCIOM	37.1%	1.5%	3.2%	Deceased	—	1.9%	13.4%	15.2%				4.1%	14.9%		1.0%	0.9%	1.8%		2.4%	40.1%	
24–30 Nov 2022	Levada Center	39%	—	5%	Deceased		1%	12%	14%	3%	3%	—		17%	—	—	1%		—	5%	7%	18%
30 Sep 2022	Russia annexes part of southeastern Ukraine																					
21–27 Jul 2022	Levada Center	43%	—	4%	Deceased		1%	14%	14%	3%	4%	—		16%	—	—	1%		—	5%	16%	16%
6 Apr 2022	Liberal Democratic Party of Russia leader Vladimir Zhirinovsky dies																					
24 Feb 2022	Beginning of the Russian invasion of Ukraine																					
21 Feb 2022	Russia announces international recognition of the Donetsk People's Republic and the Luhansk People's Republic																					
10–28 Dec 2021	CIPKR	—	3%	—	0%		5%	18%	—	2%	1%	1%		15%	—	—	—		—	24%	31%	
25 Nov–1 Dec 2021	Levada Center	32%	1%	2%	3%		1%	1%	—	—	—	—		1%	—	—	1%		—	3%	21%	27%
22–28 Apr 2021	Levada Center	40%	1%	2%	4%		2%	—	—	—	—	—		1%	1%	1%	1%		—	3%	18%	23%
17 Jan 2021	Arrest of Alexei Navalny																					
Dec 2020	CIPKR	—	5%	—	1%		2%	18%	—	4%	2%	0%		8%	—	—	—		–	33%	27%	
19–26 Nov 2020	Levada Center	39%	1%	2%	6%		2%	1%	—	—	—	—		1%	—	1%	—		—	2%	16%	24%
20–26 Aug 2020	Levada Center	40%	1%	1%	4%		2%	1%	—	—	—	—		1%	1%	1%	—		—	2%	26%	22%
9 Jul 2020	Arrest of Sergei Furgal																					
18–23 Dec 2019	CIPKR	—	9%	—	4%		—	24%	—	11%	5%	1%		—	—	—	—		–	26%	20%	
12–18 Dec 2019	Levada Center	38%	3%	2%	4%		2%	1%	—	1%	—	—		—	—	—	—		–	2%	26%	22%
18–24 Jul 2019	Levada Center	40%	3%	1%	3%		1%	—	—	<1%	—	—		—	—	—	—		–	2%	31%	19%
21–27 Mar 2019	Levada Center	41%	4%	2%	5%		1%	1%	—	—	—	—		—	—	—	—		–	3%	26%	19%
18–24 Oct 2018	Levada Center	40%	3%	2%	4%		1%	<1%	<1%	—	—	—		—	—	—	—		–	2%	27%	23%

=== Exit polling ===
Exit polls on 17 March released by the Russian Public Opinion Research Center showed Vladimir Putin with 87% of the vote, 10% more than in 2018, Nikolai Kharitonov with 4.6%, Vladislav Davankov with 4.2% and Leonid Slutsky with 3%. Invalid ballots accounted for 1.2% of votes cast.

==== Overseas ====
Unofficial exit polls results by country: Davankov: 70–80% Davankov: 60–70% Davankov: 50–60% Davankov: 40–50% Putin: 30–40% Putin: 40–50% Putin: 50–60% Putin: 80–90%

Official results abroad

The CEC said that 388,791 Russians cast their ballots from abroad.

In contrast to the official exit polls and results of the election both inside and outside of Russia, unofficial exit polls of the votes cast abroad showed a much poorer performance for Putin. According to the Vote Abroad project, Davankov won a plurality of the votes at most of the voting stations abroad, earning his best result in Trabzon. However, Putin secured pluralities in Genoa, Rome, Nicosia, Chișinău, Ankara, Samarkand and Bonn. He also won 59% in Athens, making it his best performance abroad. Conversely, he got his worst showing in The Hague, with just 2% of the vote. Putin won 3% in Poland, Serbia and Montenegro, and 8% in Almaty, Kazakhstan.

According to the Vote Abroad project, Putin was also voted for by 4% of Russians living in Lithuania and the Czech Republic, 5% in Istanbul, Turkey, 6% in Argentina and the United Kingdom, 7% in Austria, Ireland and Slovakia, 8% in Estonia, Denmark and Yerevan, Armenia, 9% in Portugal, 10% in Thailand, Finland and Berlin, Germany, 11% in Madrid, Spain and Paris, France, 13% in Norway, 14% in Sweden and Hungary, 15% in Vietnam and the United States, 16% in Tel Aviv, Israel and Bern, Switzerland, 17% in Japan, 22% in Cyprus, 23% in Milan, Italy, 31% in Dubai, 35% in Chișinău, Moldova and Uzbekistan, 36% in Kyrgyzstan and 38% in Rome, Italy. In total, exit polls organized by exiled Russian activists across 44 countries showed Davankov gaining more votes than Putin in all but five countries.

The election was also held in Moldova's Transnistria, an internationally unrecognized state. 46,179 people with Russian citizenship voted in the election, the lowest turnout in a Russian presidential election in the last 18 years. 97% voted for Putin, with the other three candidates not having even obtained 1,000 votes combined. According to TRT Russian, the low turnout indicated changes in the political activity of Transnistrians with Russian citizenship, with over 73,000 having participated in the last election six years ago. Furthermore, it stated Moldovan analysts believed the low turnout indicated a trend that Transnistria was moving away from Russia and that Moldovan President Maia Sandu's pro-European policy was influencing the region.

== Election observers ==
The domestic watchdog Golos, having been previously labelled a "foreign agent" in 2013 after documenting fraud in the 2011 parliamentary vote and the 2012 presidential election, was not allowed to send election observers.

On 29 January 2024, the OSCE's Office for Democratic Institutions and Human Rights (ODIHR) announced that the organisation would not participate in international monitoring of election, citing the lack of an invitation from Russia.

On 17 March 2024, the Chair of the Central Election Commission of the Russian Federation (CEC), Ella Pamfilova, announced that 1,115 international observers and experts from 129 countries were monitoring the electoral process.

== Results ==
Second place by federal subject: Kharitonov Davankov Slutsky

Candidate	Party	Votes	%
Vladimir Putin	Independent (Note: Supported by the People's Front, United Russia, A Just Russia – For Truth, Rodina, Russian Party of Pensioners for Social Justice, Party of Business, Russian All-People's Union and Democratic Party of Russia)	76,277,708	88.48
Nikolay Kharitonov	Communist Party	3,768,470	4.37
Vladislav Davankov	New People	3,362,484	3.90
Leonid Slutsky	Liberal Democratic Party	2,795,629	3.24
Total		86,204,291	100.00
Valid votes		86,204,291	98.43
Invalid/blank votes		1,371,784	1.57
Total votes		87,576,075	100.00
Registered voters/turnout		113,011,059	77.49
Source: CEC, Rapsi News, Bezformata

On 21 March, the CEC officially announced that Vladimir Putin had won the election, receiving 87.28% of all votes cast (including invalid ballots), followed by Nikolai Kharitonov with 4.31% of the vote, Vladislav Davankov with 3.85% and Leonid Slutsky with 3.20%.

=== Results by federal subject ===
Results of Putin by federal subject

Results of Kharitonov by federal subject

Results of Davankov by federal subject

Results of Slutsky by federal subject

Results by federal subject
Region	Putin	Kharitonov	Davankov	Slutsky
Adygea	90.18%	3.68%	2.20%	2.70%
Altai Krai	84.88%	5.41%	4.58%	3.63%
Altai Republic	86.49%	5.63%	3.43%	2.73%
Amur Oblast	86.97%	3.94%	3.66%	3.69%
Arkhangelsk Oblast	79.25%	5.31%	7.60%	5.93%
Astrakhan Oblast	87.45%	5.39%	3.72%	2.31%
Bashkortostan	90.90%	3.69%	2.72%	1.88%
Belgorod Oblast	90.66%	3.59%	2.36%	2.50%
Bryansk Oblast	89.97%	4.25%	1.44%	3.62%
Buryatia	87.96%	4.32%	3.71%	2.38%
Chechnya	98.99%	0.29%	0.15%	0.50%
Chelyabinsk Oblast	84.32%	5.40%	4.90%	3.49%
Chukotka	90.49%	2.30%	2.92%	3.03%
Chuvashia	85.49%	5.35%	4.70%	3.01%
Dagestan	92.93%	3.97%	0.73%	1.80%
Donetsk People's Republic*	95.23%	1.62%	1.33%	1.53%
Ingushetia	89.61%	3.72%	2.45%	2.83%
Irkutsk Oblast	84.65%	4.96%	4.53%	4.79%
Ivanovo Oblast	86.88%	4.66%	3.66%	3.24%
Jewish Autonomous Oblast	92.35%	3.17%	1.39%	2.03%
Kabardino-Balkaria	94.21%	2.45%	1.12%	2.12%
Kaliningrad Oblast	85.44%	3.62%	5.86%	3.13%
Kalmykia	87.17%	7.70%	2.06%	2.13%
Kaluga Oblast	83.79%	5.00%	5.74%	3.48%
Kamchatka Krai	85.03%	4.12%	4.86%	4.29%
Karachay-Cherkessia	90.07%	5.11%	1.04%	2.92%
Karelia	79.53%	4.76%	8.38%	5.02%
Kemerovo Oblast	95.72%	1.36%	1.00%	1.13%
Khabarovsk Krai	80.06%	5.43%	6.63%	5.01%
Khakassia	85.28%	5.84%	4.01%	3.03%
Khanty–Mansi	86.71%	5.56%	2.45%	4.43%
Kherson Oblast*	88.12%	4.88%	2.03%	4.60%
Kirov Oblast	80.08%	5.56%	6.65%	5.41%
Komi Republic	80.49%	5.38%	6.45%	5.08%
Kostroma Oblast	80.52%	6.49%	6.09%	4.69%
Krasnodar Krai	92.59%	3.42%	1.38%	2.01%
Krasnoyarsk Krai	84.12%	4.35%	5.46%	3.98%
Kurgan Oblast	85.63%	5.01%	3.82%	3.99%
Kursk Oblast	88.51%	3.62%	3.80%	2.78%
Leningrad Oblast	86.36%	4.78%	3.99%	2.95%
Lipetsk Oblast	86.99%	4.72%	4.04%	2.88%
Lugansk People's Republic*	94.12%	1.91%	1.39%	2.13%
Magadan Oblast	84.89%	4.38%	4.73%	3.85%
Mari El	84.24%	6.11%	4.72%	3.36%
Mordovia	89.57%	4.22%	2.38%	3.00%
Moscow	85.13%	3.84%	6.65%	2.38%
Moscow Oblast	86.50%	5.09%	4.21%	3.04%
Murmansk Oblast	83.21%	4.03%	6.67%	4.16%
Nenets	79.08%	6.86%	6.46%	5.84%
Nizhny Novgorod Oblast	86.40%	5.47%	3.75%	3.32%
North Ossetia–Alania	89.01%	5.10%	1.70%	3.50%
Novgorod Oblast	82.06%	5.21%	6.22%	4.28%
Novosibirsk Oblast	83.88%	4.60%	6.40%	3.06%
Omsk Oblast	82.77%	5.71%	5.67%	3.32%
Orenburg Oblast	87.05%	5.06%	3.44%	2.80%
Oryol Oblast	80.23%	9.14%	4.35%	4.25%
Penza Oblast	89.97%	4.05%	2.51%	2.33%
Perm Krai	84.65%	4.96%	4.53%	4.79%
Primorsky Krai	88.34%	3.35%	2.72%	4.07%
Pskov Oblast	84.70%	5.29%	5.23%	3.48%
Republic of Crimea*	93.60%	2.08%	1.94%	1.30%
Rostov Oblast	90.81%	3.65%	2.76%	2.07%
Ryazan Oblast	89.93%	4.29%	3.76%	2.65%
Saint Petersburg	81.65%	3.49%	6.99%	5.15%
Sakha (Yakutia)	87.79%	4.32%	4.73%	1.76%
Sakhalin Oblast	86.37%	4.61%	3.85%	3.25%
Samara Oblast	86.76%	4.36%	4.18%	3.07%
Saratov Oblast	91.66%	4.78%	1.18%	1.75%
Sevastopol*	92.60%	2.07%	2.88%	1.54%
Smolensk Oblast	84.65%	5.08%	4.75%	3.25%
Stavropol Krai	88.56%	3.99%	1.51%	5.37%
Sverdlovsk Oblast	82.10%	4.23%	7.31%	3.91%
Tambov Oblast	85.59%	6.43%	3.08%	3.77%
Tatarstan	88.74%	4.83%	1.53%	3.93%
Tomsk Oblast	82.15%	4.39%	7.48%	3.62%
Tula Oblast	87.29%	4.89%	3.50%	2.87%
Tuva	95.37%	2.10%	1.07%	1.14%
Tver Oblast	84.38%	4.80%	5.28%	3.59%
Tyumen Oblast	84.76%	6.17%	2.03%	6.27%
Udmurtia	81.83%	5.42%	6.16%	4.23%
Ulyanovsk Oblast	83.85%	5.81%	4.71%	3.62%
Vladimir Oblast	84.93%	4.68%	4.88%	3.79%
Volgograd Oblast	88.00%	6.63%	1.13%	3.72%
Vologda Oblast	79.74%	5.66%	7.01%	5.77%
Voronezh Oblast	88.83%	3.73%	3.95%	2.39%
Yamalo-Nenets	91.75%	2.51%	1.60%	3.37%
Yaroslavl Oblast	80.84%	5.38%	7.39%	4.46%
Zabaykalsky Krai	87.71%	3.99%	3.26%	3.32%
Zaporozhye Oblast*	92.83%	2.21%	1.87%	2.52%

* = Russian-occupied territories of Ukraine

== Reactions ==
=== Domestic ===
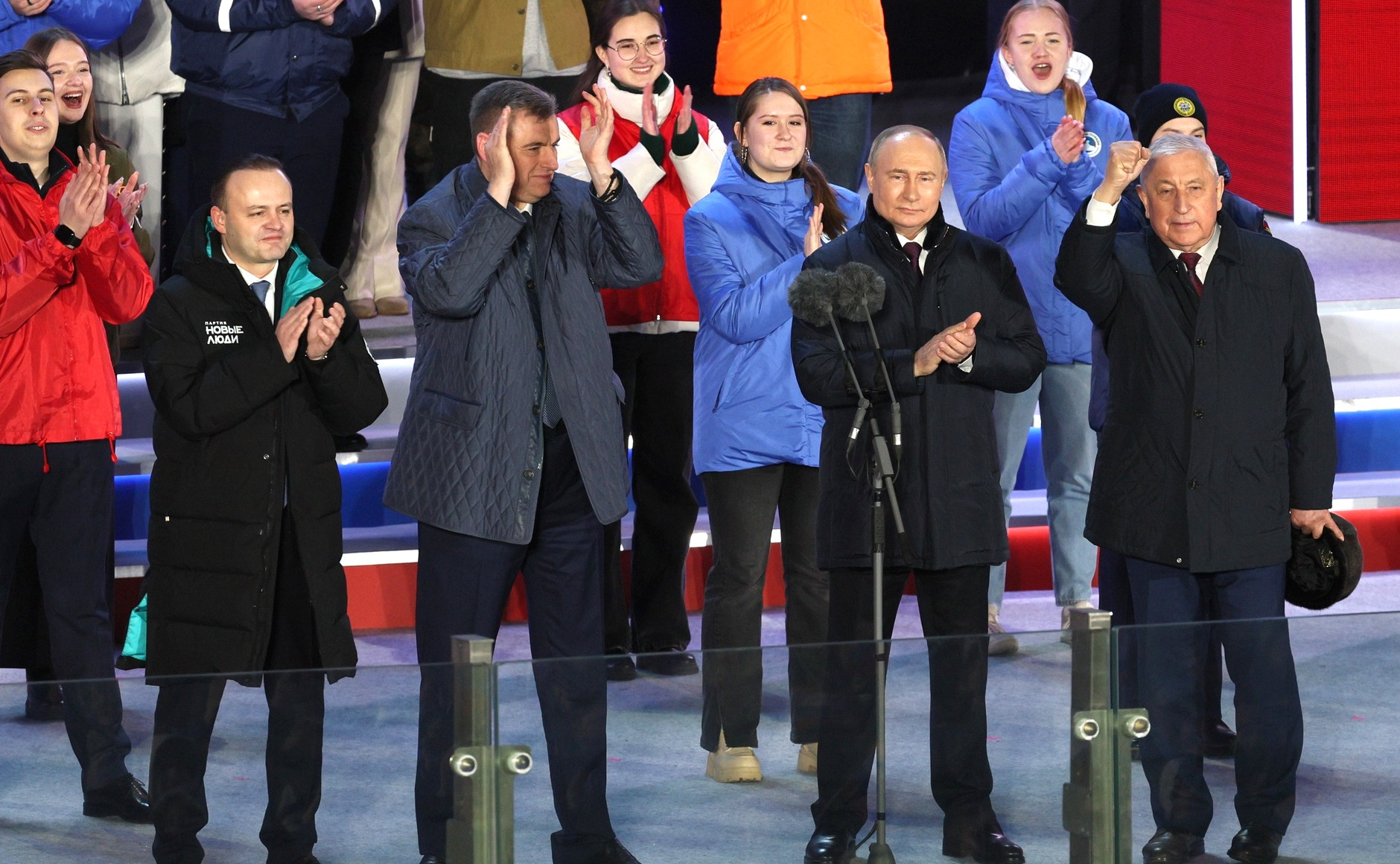
2024 Russian presidential election candidates: Vladislav Davankov, Leonid Slutsky, Vladimir Putin, Nikolai Kharitonov (left to right) on Red Square after the end of the elections on 18 March 2024

On 6 August 2023, Kremlin spokesman Dmitry Peskov told The New York Times that "our presidential election is not really democracy, it is costly bureaucracy. Mr. Putin will be re-elected next year with more than 90 percent of the vote". Later he clarified that this was his personal opinion. In an interview with the RBK news agency, Peskov said that Russia "theoretically" does not need to hold presidential elections because "it's obvious that Putin will be reelected."

On 6 November 2023, journalist Yekaterina Duntsova announced her intention to run for the presidency in the 2024 election; she said she would run as an independent candidate on an anti-war platform. The next month, her nomination documents were rejected by the Central Election Commission. On 31 May 2024, Dunstsova was declared a "foreign agent" by Russian authorities.

In November 2023, nationalist ex-militia commander Igor Girkin announced his intention to run as a candidate in the 2024 elections, describing elections in Russia as a "sham" in which "the only winner [referring to Putin] is known in advance".

In January 2024, citing unidentified sources in the Kremlin, the independent news outlet Vyorstka reported that the CEC, at the behest of the Kremlin, will likely reject Boris Nadezhdin's registration due to his criticism of Putin and anti-war stances. In late January 2024, a source in the Putin administration told the Latvia-based news outlet Meduza: "There's a portion of the electorate that wants the war to end. If [Putin's opponent in the elections] decides to cater to this demand, they may get a decent percentage. And [the Putin administration] doesn't need that." Russian state media intensified a smear campaign against Nadezhdin in the weeks leading up to the election. On 30 January 2024, Kremlin propagandist and television presenter Vladimir Solovyov warned Nadezhdin: "I feel bad for Boris. The fool didn't realize that he's not being set up to run for president but for a criminal case on charges of betraying the Motherland."

Following the CEC's decision to ban him from running, Nadezhdin wrote in his Telegram channel: "I do not agree with the decision of the CEC... Participating in the presidential election in 2024 is the most important political decision in my life. I am not backing down from my intentions."

Prior to the release of official results, former president and deputy head of the Security Council of Russia Dmitry Medvedev congratulated Putin on his "splendid victory". After his victory was confirmed, Putin held a news conference on 18 March calling his win a vindication of his policy of defying the West and his decision to invade Ukraine. He also described the result as an indication of "trust" and "hope" in him. Exiled Russian dissident Leonid Volkov said that Putin's percentage of victory had "not the slightest relation to reality".

=== International ===
Most international observers did not expect the election to be either free or fair, with Putin having increased political repressions after launching his full-scale war with Ukraine in 2022. In an interview with TV3 on 4 March 2024, Latvian justice minister Inese Lībiņa-Egnere implied that Russians in the country who would participate in the election to be held in the Russian embassy in Riga could face criminal liability for justifying the invasion of Ukraine under Latvian law. On 14 March, Lībiņa-Egnere appeared to have reversed her stance, stating that participation in the elections "does not equate to supporting Putin" and is "not punishable in any way"; she added that Latvia "does not want to provoke an international row and intends to act like a democratic state". On 11 March, Armands Ruks, the head of the Latvian State Police announced that voters at the embassy would be subjected to police screenings before entering.

The Russian ambassador to Moldova, Oleg Vasnetsov, was summoned to the Ministry of Foreign Affairs of Moldova on 12 March following Russia's decision to open six polling stations in Transnistria for the election, which Moldovan foreign minister Mihai Popșoi described as "unacceptable". The Moldovan government had previously agreed to open only one polling station in the Russian embassy in Chișinău as per international law as it claimed. Russia's opening of polling stations in Transnistria was also condemned by Romania, the United States and France. On 19 March, Popșoi announced the expulsion of a Russian diplomat in response to the holding of elections in Transnistria.

The Ukrainian foreign ministry called on international media and public figures "to refrain from referring to this farce as 'elections' in the language of democratic states." The United States condemned voting in Russian-occupied areas of Ukraine, with State Department Spokesperson Matthew Miller saying that the US would "never recognize the legitimacy or outcome of these sham elections held in sovereign Ukraine". On 15 March, Ukraine's ambassador to the United Nations, Sergiy Kyslytsya, released a joint statement on behalf of Ukraine, the European Union and 56 other countries including the US condemning the holding of the elections in occupied parts of the country. The Ukrainian government said it would not press charges against its residents of occupied areas who participate in the election, saying that they were being forced to vote. The UN Security Council condemned the holding of the elections in occupied territories of Ukraine with deputy secretary-general Rosemary DiCarlo saying that "holding elections in another UN member state's territory without its consent is in manifest disregard for the principles of sovereignty and territorial integrity" and were "invalid" under international law.

On the first day of regular voting on 15 March, European Council president Charles Michel sarcastically congratulated Putin for winning a "landslide victory" in the elections starting that day, adding that there was "No opposition. No freedom. No choice." On 18 March, the European Union condemned "the illegal holding of so-called elections' in the territories of Ukraine" and said it would never recognize them. The EU's foreign policy chief Josep Borrell added that the election was held in the context of a shrinking political space.

Following the release of the results, Germany described the vote as a "pseudo-election" under an authoritarian ruler reliant on censorship, repression and violence. The UK's Foreign Secretary, David Cameron condemned "the illegal holding of elections on Ukrainian territory", adding that the vote was "not what free and fair elections look like". A spokesperson for the United States National Security Council described the election as "obviously not free nor fair given how Mr. Putin has imprisoned political opponents and prevented others from running against him", but said that the US would recognize Putin as president. In his evening address on 17 March, Ukrainian President Volodymyr Zelenskyy described the election as an "imitation" with "no legitimacy", adding that Putin was "addicted to power and does everything he can to rule forever" and that "There is no evil he will not commit to prolong his personal power." Italian foreign minister Antonio Tajani described the election as "neither free nor fair", while Czech foreign minister Jan Lipavský called the election a "farce and parody". Lithuanian foreign minister Gabrielius Landsbergis called the voting a "procedure that is supposed to resemble elections", adding that "Some might call it reappointment, lacking any legitimacy." The French foreign ministry said the "conditions for a free, pluralist and democratic election were not met", but praised "the courage of the many Russian citizens who have peacefully demonstrated their opposition to this attack on their fundamental political rights." South Korea refrained from commenting on the election and said that "it would make considerations of 'appropriateness' in regard to a possible congratulatory cable to Putin."

Leaders of countries with neutral or friendly relations with Russia sent congratulations to Putin on his victory, (Note: Algeria, Armenia, Azerbaijan, Bahrain, Bangladesh, Belarus, Bolivia, Brazil, Burkina Faso, Burundi, Cambodia, the Central African Republic, Chad, China, the Democratic Republic of the Congo, the Republic of the Congo, Cuba, Egypt, Guinea-Bissau, Eritrea, Honduras, Hungary, India, Iran, Kazakhstan, North Korea, Kuwait, Kyrgyzstan, Laos, Libya, Mali, Morocco, Myanmar, Nicaragua, Niger, Oman, Pakistan, Palestine, Qatar, the Sahrawi Arab Democratic Republic, Saudi Arabia, Serbia, South Africa, Syria, Tajikistan, Tanzania, Turkey, Turkmenistan, the United Arab Emirates, Uzbekistan, Venezuela, Vietnam, Yemen, and Zimbabwe) along with President of Republika Srpska Milorad Dodik, members of the Moldovan opposition, and Hamas political chairman Ismail Haniyeh. Presidents Aslan Bzhania and Alan Gagloev, of the pro-Russian breakaway states of Abkhazia and South Ossetia respectively, also congratulated Putin.

=== Protests ===
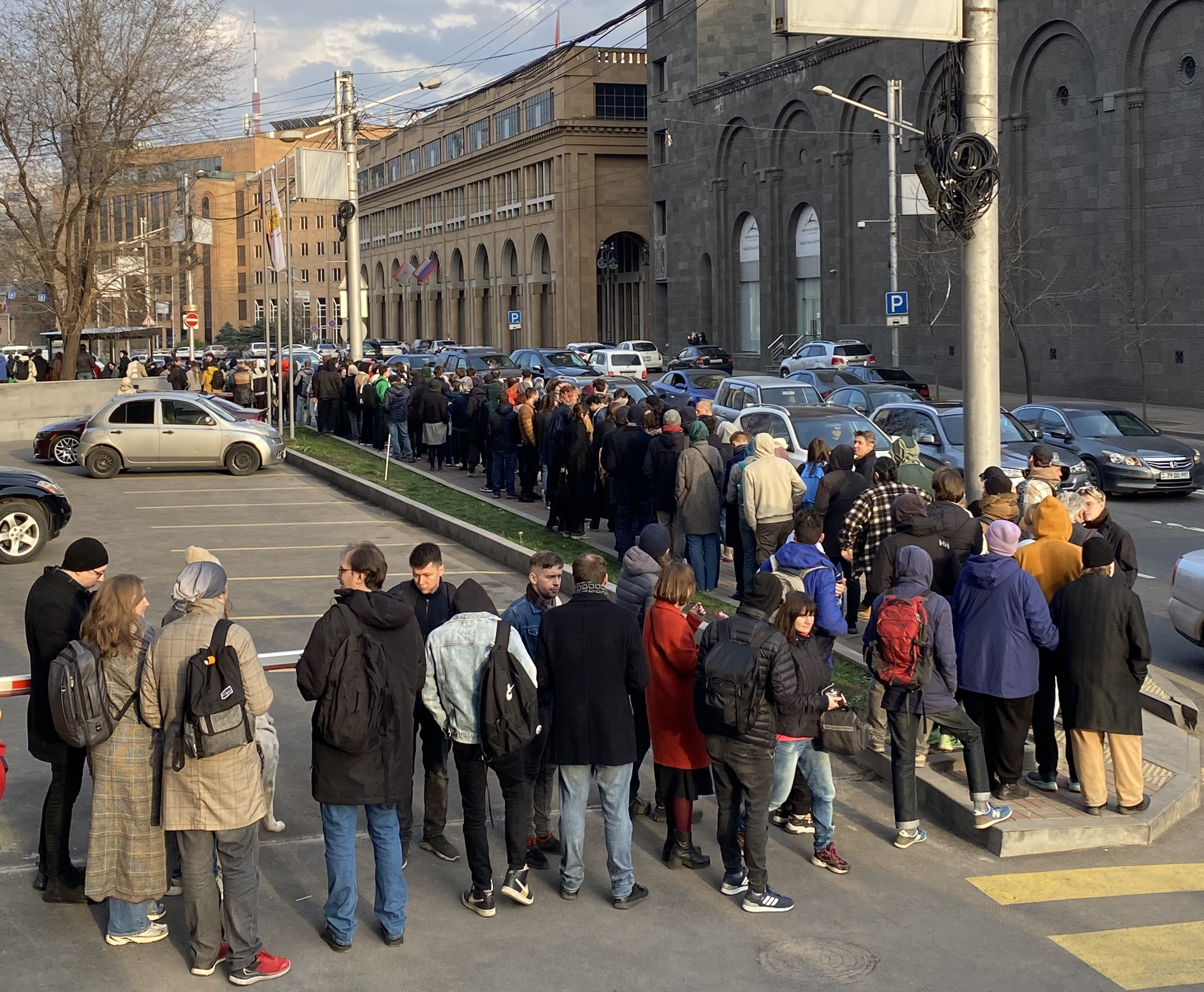
Russian immigrants outside the Russian embassy in Yerevan, Armenia as part of the "Noon Against Putin" event, 17 March 2024

On 1 February 2024, jailed Kremlin critic Alexei Navalny and his allies called on supporters to protest Putin and the invasion of Ukraine on the last day of the election on 17 March all going to vote against Putin at the same time.As was the case in the 2018 presidential election, the most prominent opposition leader, Navalny, was barred from running due to a prior criminal conviction seen as politically motivated. Navalny died in prison in February 2024, weeks before the election, under suspicious circumstances. Following Navalny's death, there were calls from Andrius Kubilius, Mikhail Khodorkovsky, and Navalny's widow, Yulia Navalnaya for the EU to recognize the Russian elections as illegitimate. Navalnaya called for Russians critical of Putin to join the "Noon Against Putin" initiative to form long queues at polling stations at noon on 17 March before proceeding to vote for anyone other than Putin, spoil their ballots or cast Navalny's name. On the day of the action, Navalnaya joined queues outside the Russian embassy in Berlin for about six hours before casting her vote for her husband and praising protesters for giving her "hope that everything is not in vain". In Russia, queues formed at polling stations in Moscow and Saint Petersburg at noon. Queues were also observed outside Russian diplomatic missions worldwide, including in Belgrade, London, Podgorica, Tallinn, Paris and Milan.

In response to the protests, authorities in Moscow threatened to prosecute participants under Article 141 of the Criminal Code of Russia, which prescribes five years' imprisonment for the obstruction of elections or citizens' electoral rights. On 17 March, the Russian human rights group OVD-Info said that 80 people in 20 cities across Russia were arrested for election-related offences. In response to the Noon Against Putin protests abroad, foreign ministry spokesperson Maria Zakharova described the queues outside Russian embassies as evidence of support for the Kremlin.

== Aftermath ==
Vladimir Putin was inaugurated on 7 May 2024.

== 2024 problem ==
The "2024 problem" referred to the end of Putin's presidential powers in 2024. Analysts saw it as a problem of how Putin's regime could survive his departure, and Levada Center focus groups reduced the options to two: Putin keeping power or appointing a successor.

Commentators outlined several scenarios:

Competitive free elections
the least likely option, with a successor emerging through an open political process.
Appointing a successor
one of the most likely options, with Putin backing a chosen candidate, as he himself had been Boris Yeltsin's successor and Dmitry Medvedev had been his.
Amending the Constitution
lifting the term limit so Putin could run again, an option Valery Zorkin floated but which Putin publicly rejected.
Keeping power without the presidency
Putin taking another post as in 2008–2012 (e.g. an empowered Prime Minister, Chairman of the State Duma, Security Council or State Council) and possibly running again in 2030. In January 2020 he announced constitutional amendments expanding the powers of the Duma and State Council, fuelling speculation he might lead a strengthened State Council after leaving office.

A central difficulty, analysts noted, was whether a successor could shield Putin as Putin had shielded Yeltsin, and whether the system he built could function without him.
