= Nikolay Kharitonov =

Russian politician (born 1948)

HLRF MP Nikolay Kharitonov
- Николай Харитонов
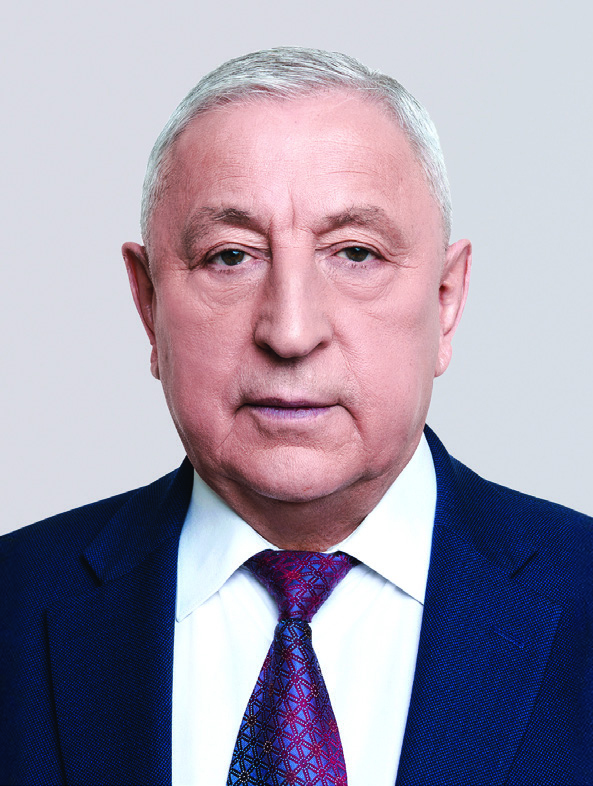
- Official portrait, 2024

Chairman of the State Duma Committee on the Development of Far Eastern and Arctic regions
- Incumbent
- Assumed office 21 December 2011
- Preceded by: office established

Member of the State Duma
- Incumbent
- Assumed office 11 January 1994
- Constituency: Novosibirsk Oblast (1994–2007); Party List (2007–2016, 2021–present); Krasnodar Krai (2016–2021)

Personal details
- Born: 30 October 1948 (age 77) Rezino, Novosibirsk Oblast, Russian SFSR, Soviet Union
- Party: CPRF (from 2008); Agrarian Party (until 2007); CPSU (until 1991)
- Spouse: Nina Kharitonova (m. 1972)
- Children: 4
- Education: Novosibirsk Agricultural Institute; Russian Academy of National Economy; Moscow Timiryazev Agricultural Academy (DPhil)
- Occupation: Politician; Agronomist

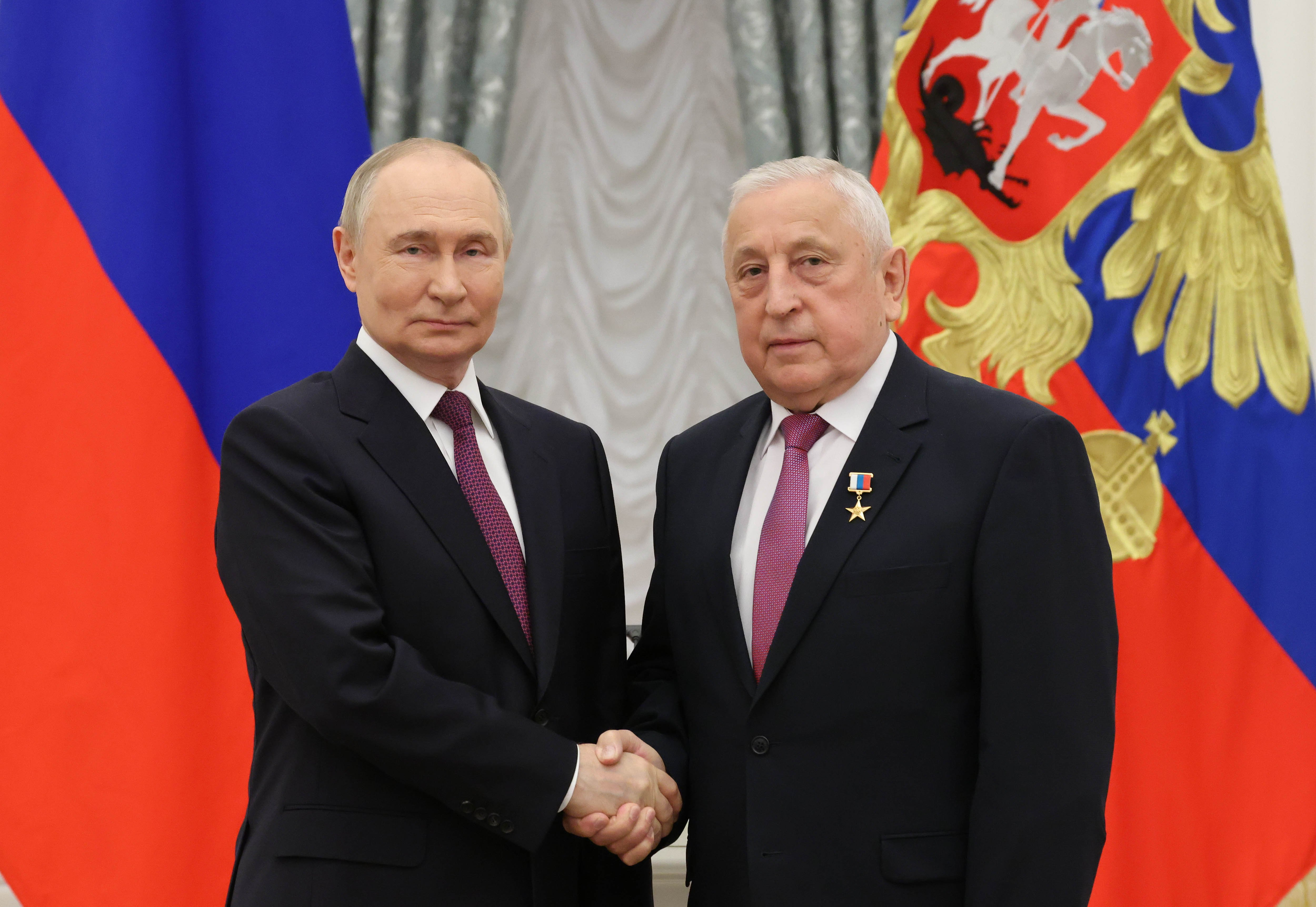
Kharitonov and Vladimir Putin, 22 May 2025

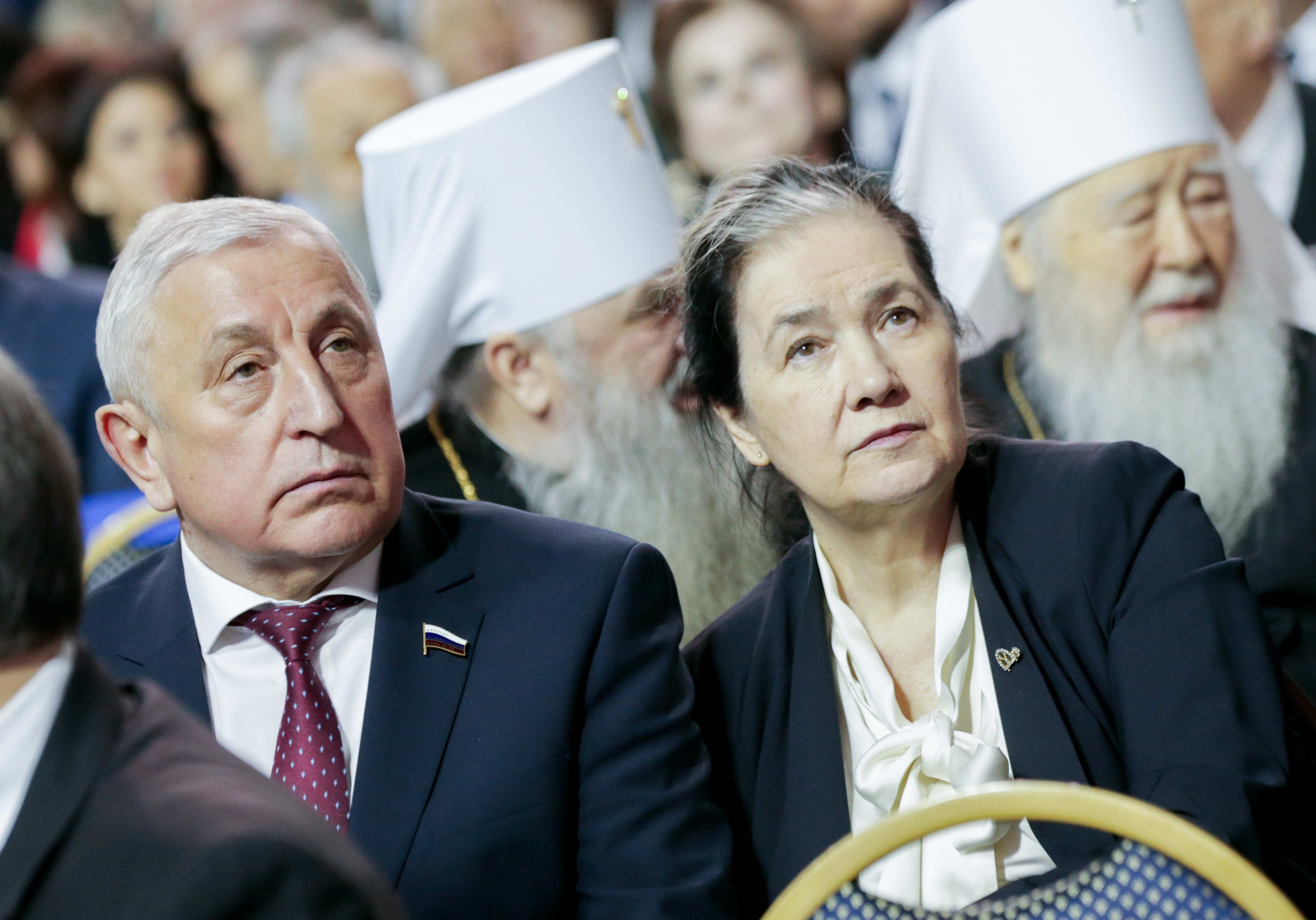
Kharitonov and his wife, 2019

Nikolay Mikhailovich Kharitonov (Note: Given name also transliterated as Nikolai) (Russian: Николай Михайлович Харитонов; born 30 October 1948) is a Russian communist politician. He has been the chairman of the State Duma Committee on the Development of Far Eastern and Arctic regions from 21 December 2011. Since 2025 he has been named a Hero of Labour of the Russian Federation.

Kharitonov was previously a member of the Agrarian Party until he quit in protest of their cooperation with the ruling United Russia party. He is best known for his unsuccessful bid to unseat incumbent President Vladimir Putin in the 2004 presidential election, and again in the 2024 presidential election.

== Biography ==
Nikolai Kharitonov was born on October 30, 1948, in the village of Rezino in Novosibirsk Oblast. He completed his education at the Novosibirsk Agricultural Institute. Between 1972 and 1994, he served as an agronomist and subsequently as the manager of the Galinsky state farm in the Moshkovsky District of Novosibirsk Oblast.

Since 1994, he has been a member of the State Duma.

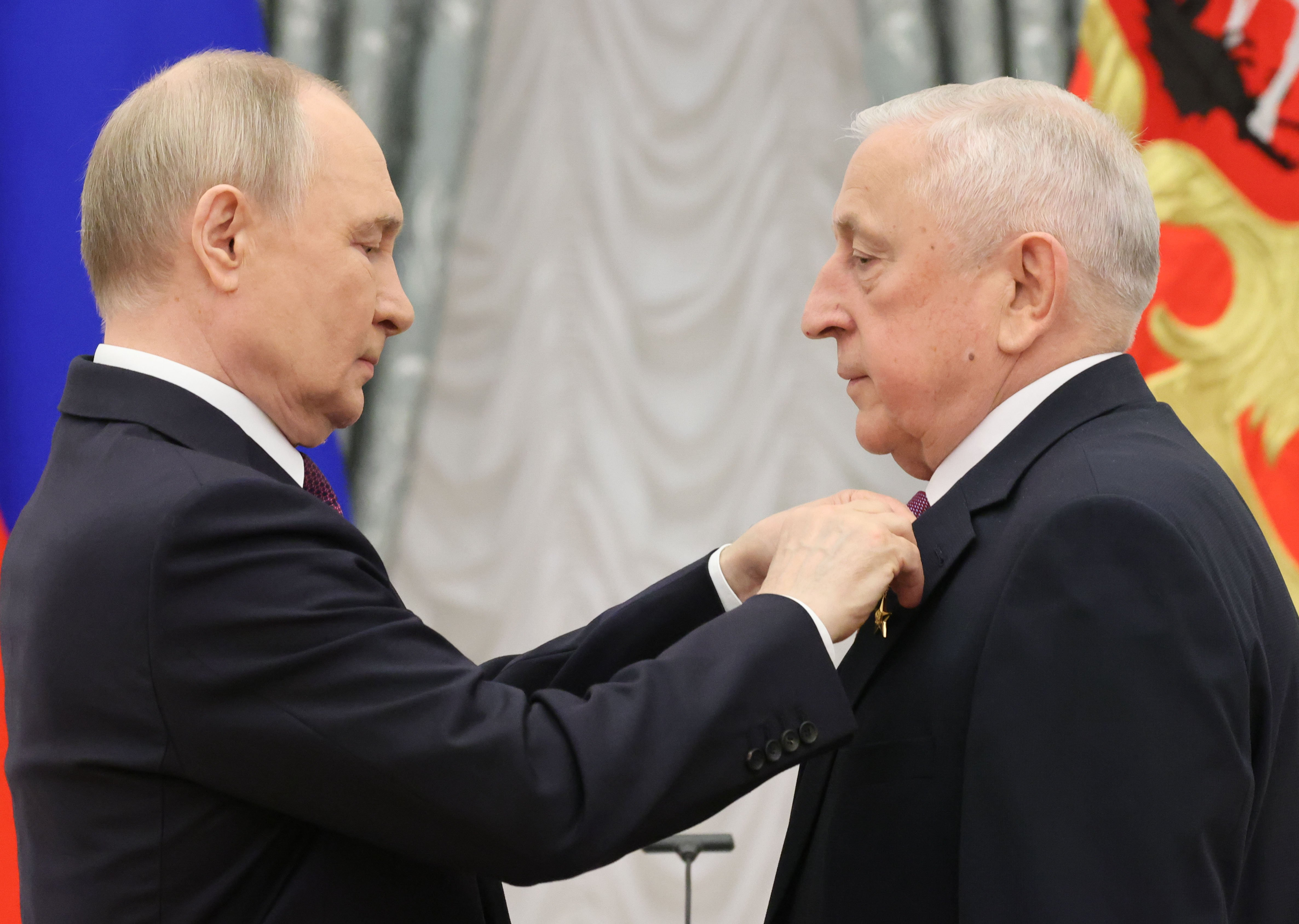
Kharitonov being awarded with the star Hero of Labour of the Russian Federation, 22 May 2025

== 2004 presidential campaign ==
Kharitonov was the Communist Party's nominee in the 2004 Russian presidential election. At the time, some observers perceived him to be a weak candidate, lacking in both name recognition and charisma. Russians were largely indifferent or unaware of his candidacy. He ran on the slogan "For the native land and the popular will", and spoke frequently of the virtues of Leninism. Kharitonov proposed re-erecting the statue of Soviet secret police founder Felix Dzerzhinsky, which formerly stood in front of the Lubyanka Building until it was pulled down in 1991.

Kharitonov was strongly supported by party leader Gennady Zyuganov. Many of Kharitonov's advertisements featured Zyuganov speaking on behalf of his candidacy. Although Zyuganov had originally wanted the party to abstain from participating in the elections to protest what he considered to be the "undemocratic nature" of the election, he could not coalesce the party in agreement on non-participation and ultimately supported Kharitonov.

Putin's camp believed that Kharitonov's candidacy benefited their cause by helping to increase turnout and weakening Sergey Glazyev's vote share. The Communist Party had been besieged by fierce opposition ads during the preceding legislative election in 2003. However, Kharitonov escaped similar opposition ads, as Putin's campaign sought to avoid increasing his notoriety (thereby giving him a platform). During the campaign, Kharitonov threatened to drop out of the race if he did not receive live coverage for his speeches just as Putin had. Following his complaints, the RTR television network agreed to broadcast live coverage of a speech Kharitonov gave to his supporters in Tula on 4 March 2004.

Kharitonov eventually lost the election, coming in second place with 13% of the vote.

== 2024 presidential campaign ==
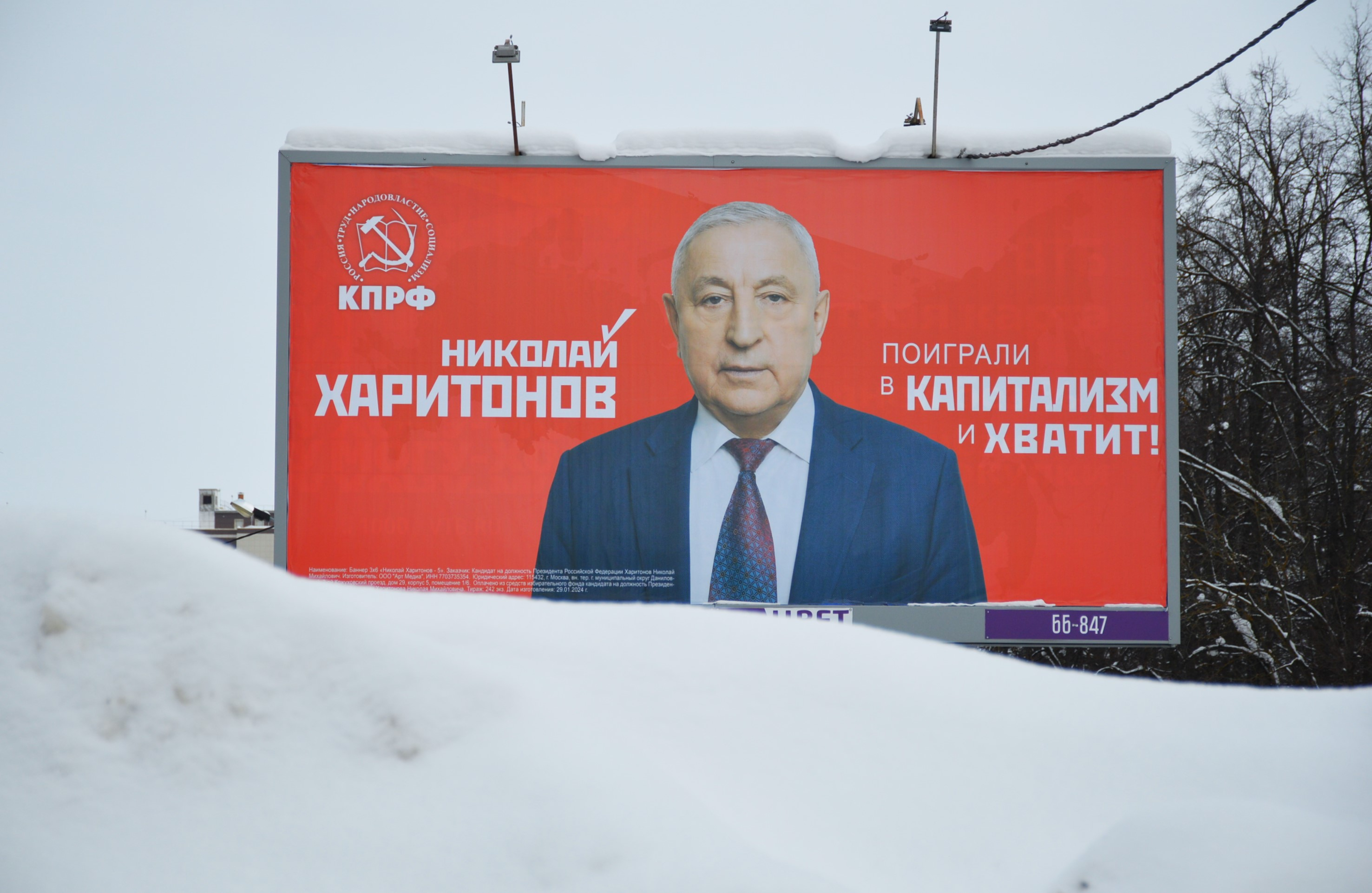
Kharitonov on a billboard in Kazan, 2024

Kharitonov announced that he would challenge Putin to a rematch in the 2024 Russian presidential election. Despite opposing many of Putin's domestic policies, he does not oppose the Russian invasion of Ukraine, and as such has been placed on the sanctions list of the United Kingdom and the United States.

Kharitonov proposed a change in socio-economic policy, the development of industrial and agricultural sectors, and the nationalization of the nation's mineral resource base with the aim of generating new industrialization. Kharitonov also advocated the introduction of a progressive scale of taxation, lowering the retirement age to 55 for women and 60 for men, raising the monthly minimum wage to 35,000 rubles and increasing pensions.

When asked by a BBC journalist about his electoral campaign, Kharitonov refused to answer why he thought he would be a better candidate than Vladimir Putin, before proceeding to praise the latter for "trying to solve a lot of the problems of the 1990s" and consolidating the country for "victory in all areas".

Kharitonov lost in a landslide, placing second with 4.4% of the vote compared to Putin's 88.5%.

== Sanctions ==
On February 24, 2022, he was added to Canada's sanctions list of "close associates of the regime" for voting in favor of recognizing the independence of the "so-called republics in Donetsk and Luhansk." Additionally, he was included in the sanctions lists of Switzerland, Australia, Japan, Ukraine, and New Zealand.

On March 24, 2022, he was included in the US sanctions list for "complicity in Putin's war" and "support for the Kremlin's efforts to invade Ukraine".

== Notes ==
Preceded by Gennady Zyuganov	Communist Party presidential candidate 2004	Succeeded by Gennady Zyuganov
Preceded by Pavel Grudinin	Communist Party presidential candidate 2024	Succeeded by
