= 2004 Russian presidential election =

- 14 March 2004
- Opinion polls
- Registered: 108,064,281
- Turnout: 64.32% (▼4.32pp)
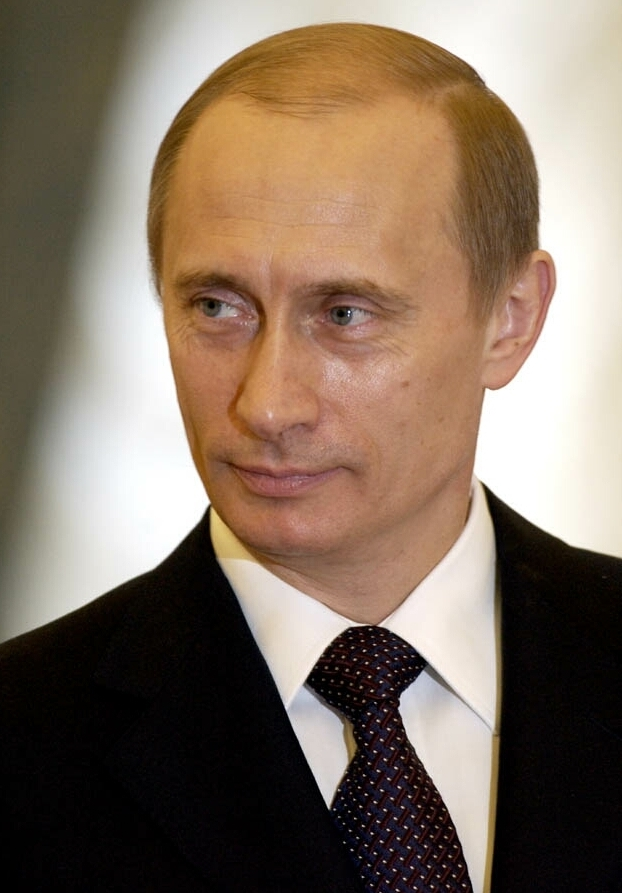

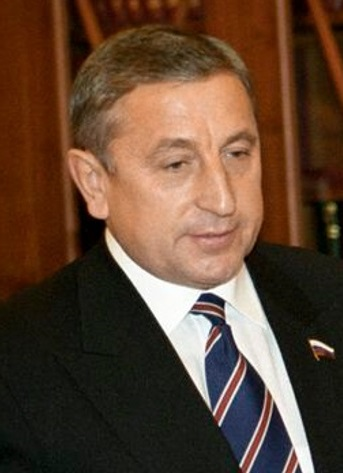
Nominee	Vladimir Putin	Nikolay Kharitonov
Party	Independent	CPRF
Popular vote	49,563,020	9,514,224
Percentage	71.91%	13.80%
- Results by federal subject Vladimir Putin: 50–55% 55–60% 60–65% 65–70% 70–75% 75–80% 80–85% 85–90% 90–95% >95%
President before election
Vladimir Putin
Independent
Elected President
Vladimir Putin
Independent

Presidential elections were held in Russia on 14 March 2004. Incumbent President Vladimir Putin was seeking a second full four-year term. It was a landslide victory for Putin, who was re-elected with 72% of the vote.

== Candidates ==
=== Registered candidates ===
Candidates are listed in the order they appear on the ballot paper (alphabetical order in Russian).

Candidate name, age, political party	Political offices	Details
Sergey Glazyev (43); Independent (campaign)	Leader of the Rodina parliamentary group (2003–2004); Deputy of the State Duma (1994–1996 and 2000–2007); Minister of Foreign Economic Relations of Russia (1992–1993)	Glazyev was Minister of Foreign Economic Relations of Russia under Boris Yeltsin, a Communist member of the State Duma and in 2003 became co-chairman of the newly established Rodina bloc. However, he failed to win the Rodina nomination because of a power struggle with Dmitry Rogozin, and ran as independent candidate. He campaigned as a critic of economic reforms. He argued that post-Communist governments have ignored social justice and promised to improve welfare.
Oleg Malyshkin (52); Liberal Democratic Party (campaign)	Deputy of the State Duma (2003–2007)	Malyshkin was nominated by the Liberal Democratic Party, after the party leader Vladimir Zhirinovsky, who contested the last three presidential elections, chose not to run again. Malyshkin, a mining engineer, had been an LDPR member since 1991 and the head of security of Vladimir Zhirinovsky. He was elected to the State Duma in 2003.
Sergey Mironov (51); Russian Party of Life (campaign)	Chairman of the Federation Council (2001–2011); Senator from Saint Petersburg (2001–2011)	Mironov was Chairman of the Federation Council, the upper house of the Russian parliament, and was considered a loyalist to Vladimir Putin. Prior to launching his campaign, he expressed his support for Putin's candidacy.
Vladimir Putin (51); Independent (campaign)	President of Russia (2000–2008 and 2012–present); Prime Minister of Russia (1999–2000 and 2008–2012); Director of the Federal Security Service (1998–1999)	Putin, formerly Prime Minister, was elected President in 2000, and ran for a second term. His popularity remained quite high during his term in office thanks to economic stability and despite controversies on media freedoms. He refused United Russia's invitation to be nominated as party candidate and ran as an independent.
Irina Khakamada (48); Independent (campaign)	Deputy of the State Duma (1994–1997 and 2000–2003)	Khakamada, the daughter of a Japanese Communist who took Soviet citizenship in the 1950s, emerged as Putin's most outspoken critic. A member of the State Duma for eight years, she lost her seat in 2003. She was a member of the Union of Rightist Forces, but did not run as a party candidate. "I am not afraid of the terrorists in power," she told the daily newspaper Kommersant. "Our children must grow up as free people. Dictatorship will not be accepted."
Nikolay Kharitonov (55); Communist Party (campaign)	Deputy of the State Duma (1994–present)	Kharitonov was the candidate of the Communist Party of the Russian Federation, despite not being a member of the party. A former KGB colonel, he was a member of the Agrarian Party of Russia, an ally of the Communist Party. He was put forward after Communist leader Gennady Zyuganov declined to stand for a third time.

=== Withdrawn candidates ===
Candidate name, age, political party	Political offices	Details	Date of withdrawal
Ivan Rybkin (57); Independent (campaign)	Secretary of the Security Council (1996-1998); Chairman of the State Duma (1994-1995); Deputy of the State Duma (1993-1996)	Rybkin was former Chairman of the State Duma, the lower house of the Russian parliament, was nominated as a presidential candidate on 29 December 2003. On 7 February 2004, he was registered as a presidential candidate, but after his scandalous disappearance and his appearance in Kyiv in February 2004, he withdrew on 6 March.	6 March 2004

== Conduct ==
=== General assessments ===
Observers representing the Organization for Security and Co-operation in Europe and the Parliamentary Assembly of the Council of Europe, cited what they called abuses of government resources, bias in the state media and instances of ballot stuffing on election day. According to the ad hoc Committee by the Parliamentary Assembly of the Council of Europe, "the elections were generally well administrated and reflected the consistently high public approval rating of the incumbent president but lacked elements of a genuine democratic contest."

"While on a technical level the election was organized with professionalism, particularly on the part of the Central Election Commission (CEC), the election process overall did not adequately reflect principles necessary for a healthy democratic election process. The election process failed to meet important commitments concerning treatment of candidates by the State-controlled media on a non-discriminatory basis, equal opportunities for all candidates and secrecy of the ballot," reported observers by Organization for Security and Co-operation in Europe. "Localised instances of election-related abuse of official function, whilst met with an appropriately robust response by the electoral authorities in some instances, reflected a lack of democratic culture, accountability and responsibility, particularly in areas distant from the capital."

Observers representing the Commonwealth of Independent States recognized the election as "free, democratic and fair". The head of the mission Yury Yarov assured that violations identified during the mission didn't affect "free expression of the electors' will and result of the election".

=== Election campaign ===
According to report by an ad hoc Committee by the Parliamentary Assembly of the Council of Europe, "The Presidential Election Law and the Basic Guarantees of Electoral Rights Law provided the legal framework for the presidential elections, laying down conditions for the transparency in the organisation and conduct of the election." Criticizing the election campaign, the Committee claimed as "unreasonable hurdle" the requirement to collect 2 million signatures for submission to the CEC in support of persons seeking registration as candidates. Another concern was, "The Russian Constitution stipulates that in a presidential election, if the turnout is less than 50%, a new round has to be held, with candidates registering anew. This clause raised concerns of authorities on voters turnout and a massive campaign encouraging people to participate in elections had been launched by the CEC and local authorities. In some regions, local authorities overused their power to force people to take part in the elections." The election campaign in general was "low-key and all but invisible, which could be explained by the predictability of the results of the election." Glazyev's manager reported the use of administrative resources by preventing Glazyev from campaigning in the regions; Khakamada claimed that "local authorities were instructed to hamper her meetings with voters".

PACE reported that despite some irregularities, "credit should be given to the election administration which ensured security and professional conduct of the voting process". PACE noted the unusually high turnout in five North Caucasus republics (more than 90%), "Mr Putin received 98.2 % of the vote in Ingushetia, 96.5 % in Kabardino-Balkaria, 94,6 % in Dagestan, 92.3% in Chechnya and 91.25% in North Ossetia. Taking into account that the general turnout of the election was only 64.39%, the election results in these regions seem to be unusually high and one-sided." Considering situation in Chechnya, the Moscow Times quoted election officials in the republic's capital, Grozny, as acknowledging that they had filled in several thousand ballots for Putin.

=== Media bias ===
The report of PACE said that "during the presidential election the International Election Observation Mission concluded that state-controlled media had displayed clear bias in favour of the incumbent in news presentation and coverage of the campaign."

According to the report by Office for Democratic Institutions and Human Rights (OSCE) of the Organization for Security and Co-operation in Europe,

Television is the main source of public information in the Russian Federation. Two State-controlled TV channels have countrywide outreach, while the most significant private TV stations are NTV and Ren TV… The State-controlled media comprehensively failed to meet its legal obligation to provide equal treatment to all candidates, displaying clear favouritism towards Mr. Putin. While the other candidates had access to television and other media, through free airtime and televised debates, their access to the primetime news programmes and current affairs programmes on the State-controlled broadcasters was limited… In contrast to the coverage by State-funded TV channels, private broadcasters monitored by the EOM provided more balanced coverage, with a greater diversity of views.

In the month prior to the election, state-funded Channel One Russia dedicated more than four hours of its news coverage to Putin, with the coverage being overwhelmingly positive. In contrast, the second-most covered candidate on Channel One was Kharitonov, who received a mere 21 minutes of primetime news coverage.

State-funded TV Russia gave Putin nearly two hours of primetime news, with the tone of the coverage being overwhelmingly positive. In contrast, Glazeyev was given only four minutes of coverage, the tone of which ranged from negative to neutral.

TV Centre, a television station that was controlled by the Moscow City administration, provided an hour and 25 minutes of coverage to Putin, with the tone being overwhelmingly positive. In contrast, TV Centre gave Glazeyev a mere seven minutes of coverage, which ranged in tone from negative to neutral.

Private broadcasters were more balanced in their television coverage. REN TV gave 35 minutes of primetime news to Mr. Putin, with 35% of this coverage being negative. They gave Khakamada 22 minutes of coverage which ranged from neutral to positive in tone. NTV gave more than 31 minutes of coverage to Mr. Putin, ranging in tone from neutral to positive. In its analytical news programs, such as Svoboda Slova and Namedni, NTV gave a relatively balanced picture of the main contestants and the State leadership. NTV, however, did not air election debates due to Putin’s refusal to take part. Additionally, NTV did not air special broadcasts for campaign programming citing to low public interest.

Most local television outlets provided very little coverage of the election. What coverage they did provide generally tended to be favorable of Putin.

Many media outlets ignored key developments in the campaign's of Putin's challengers. For instance, very few media outlets (both television and print) carried news of Khakamada's campaign announcement.

Print media displayed a variety of views, with coverage of various outlets being either strongly pro-Putin or strongly anti-Putin in bias.

=== Calls for boycott ===
A few groups, notably the Yabloko party and a number of human rights organizations, encouraged voters to boycott the election. Yabloko's leader Grigory Yavlinsky specifically called for boycotts to take place in protest of what he considered to be "the slide of the country into authoritarianism".

== Results ==
Candidate	Party	Votes	%
Vladimir Putin	Independent	49,563,020	71.91
Nikolay Kharitonov	Communist Party	9,514,224	13.80
Sergey Glazyev	Independent	2,850,330	4.14
Irina Khakamada	Independent	2,671,519	3.88
Oleg Malyshkin	Liberal Democratic Party	1,405,396	2.04
Sergey Mironov	Russian Party of Life	524,392	0.76
Against all		2,396,550	3.48
Total		68,925,431	100.00
Valid votes		68,925,431	99.17
Invalid/blank votes		578,847	0.83
Total votes		69,504,278	100.00
Registered voters/turnout		108,064,281	64.32
Source: CEC

=== By federal subject ===
Federal subject	Putin		Kharitonov		Glazyev		Khakamada		Malyshkin		Mironov		Against All	
Federal subject	Votes	%	Votes	%	Votes	%	Votes	%	Votes	%	Votes	%	Votes	%
Adygea	184,326	75.61	35,224	14.45	7,319	3.00	3,896	1.60	3,593	1.47	1,220	0.50	6,463	2.65
Altai Republic	65,751	73.03	11,812	13.48	2,974	3.39	3,074	3.51	1,213	1.38	643	0.73	1,495	1.71
Bashkortostan	2,365,768	91.78	102,189	3.96	28,603	1.11	28,748	1.12	12,748	0.49	8,420	0.33	18,356	0.71
Buryatia	298,120	66.58	76,483	17.08	12,812	2.86	32,299	7.21	7,234	1.62	3,461	0.77	11,904	2.66
Chechnya	521,317	92.30	12,950	2.29	3,636	0.64	15,068	2.67	2,052	0.36	2,010	0.36	4,513	0.80
Chuvashia	427,489	67.12	137,093	21.52	18,037	2.83	16,028	2.52	11,408	1.79	3,949	0.62	13,252	2.08
Dagestan	1,263,386	94.61	50,866	3.81	3,231	0.24	3,426	0.26	2,158	0.16	2,255	0.17	5,815	0.44
Ingushetia	147,527	98.18	782	0.52	179	0.12	157	0.10	281	0.19	1,101	0.73	90	0.06
Kabardino-Balkaria	491,916	96.49	11,310	2.22	1,880	0.37	1,562	0.31	722	0.14	611	0.12	1,250	0.25
Kalmykia	114,713	79.23	16,115	11.13	3,283	2.27	5,790	4.00	1,390	0.96	549	0.38	1,692	1.17
Karachay-Cherkessia	204,020	82.28	28,455	11.48	3,949	1.59	3,727	1.50	1,919	0.77	1,086	0.44	3,383	1.36
Karelia	237,778	74.14	32,482	10.13	8,599	2.68	17,364	5.48	7,241	2.26	3,540	1.10	11,414	3.56
Khakassia	135,708	61.41	40,568	18.36	15,287	6.92	8,904	4.03	7,329	3.32	2,336	1.06	8,857	4.01
Komi Republic	322,023	73.59	50,974	11.65	14,558	3.33	16,061	3.67	11,314	2.59	3,691	0.84	15,799	3.61
Mari El	239,483	67.30	64,551	18.14	14,635	4.11	11,522	3.24	8,540	2.40	2,959	0.83	11,017	3.10
Mordovia	560,327	91.35	27,807	4.53	6,172	0.66	4,038	0.66	4,057	0.66	1,471	0.24	4,626	0.75
North Ossetia-Alania	361,248	91.25	24,806	6.27	1,995	0.50	1,795	0.45	1,297	0.33	920	0.23	1,757	0.44
Sakha Republic	326,711	60.76	53,061	11.33	15,675	3.35	40,917	8.74	7,353	1.57	3,430	0.73	16,746	3.58
Tatarstan	1,879,023	82.58	150,048	6.59	54,853	2.41	70,767	3.11	24,644	1.08	23,188	1.02	49,655	2.18
Tuva	102,341	87.53	7,035	6.02	1,525	1.30	2,329	1.99	837	0.72	545	0.47	1,197	1.02
Udmurtia	613,335	75.97	75,506	9.35	32,303	4.00	31,246	3.87	20,961	2.60	6,465	0.80	18,797	2.33
Altai Krai	870,385	67.64	239,222	18.59	52,636	4.09	35,246	2.74	37,691	2.93	9,838	0.76	28,725	2.23
Khabarovsk Krai	473,495	64.52	95,555	13.02	42,096	5.74	37,204	5.07	24,496	3.34	8,215	1.12	45,727	6.23
Krasnodar Krai	1,607,902	67.37	459,807	19.27	98,805	4.14	68,816	2.88	44,653	1.87	13,929	0.58	73,765	3.09
Krasnoyarsk Krai	671,836	60.31	123,553	11.09	191,996	17.23	44,859	4.03	23,160	2.08	7,286	0.65	43,219	3.88
Primorsky Krai	585,850	59.37	167,576	16.98	55,382	5.61	55,565	5.63	42,656	4.32	9,874	1.00	59,976	6.08
Stavropol Krai	733,188	64.54	242,181	21.32	42,948	3.78	32,861	2.89	28,061	2.47	8,354	0.74	40,159	3.54
Amur Oblast	261,781	64.87	75,636	18.74	18,552	3.43	13,952	3.46	13,840	3.43	3,637	0.90	12,850	3.18
Arkhangelsk Oblast	483,022	77.45	58,990	9.46	18,906	3.03	26,204	4.20	11,522	1.85	4,806	0.77	16,732	2.68
Astrakhan Oblast	291,499	66.08	80,643	18.28	21,024	4.77	15,197	3.44	9,677	2.19	2,980	0.68	15,845	3.59
Belgorod Oblast	457,183	54.82	230,326	27.62	41,404	4.96	26,492	3.18	21,356	2.56	6,941	0.83	40,478	4.85
Bryansk Oblast	417,481	63.57	152,874	23.28	26,712	4.07	15,195	2.31	13,131	2.00	6,035	0.92	19,681	3.00
Chelyabinsk Oblast	1,236,952	70.18	249,852	14.18	60,191	3.42	69,903	3.97	43,589	2.47	12,858	0.73	72,215	4.10
Chita Oblast	311,661	72.49	63,530	14.78	13,381	3.11	11,033	2.57	12,304	2.86	4,000	0.93	99,26	2.31
Ivanovo Oblast	326,546	67.21	79,536	16.37	21,090	4.34	17,156	3.53	14,322	2.95	4,382	0.90	19,757	4.07
Irkutsk Oblast	578,241	61.96	156,401	16.76	53,551	5.74	51,951	5.57	37,180	3.98	9,345	1.00	39,283	4.21
Kaliningrad Oblast	278,819	69.86	47,068	11.79	20,063	5.03	17,515	4.39	7,880	1.97	4,342	1.09	20,005	5.01
Kaluga Oblast	327,778	70.16	68,807	14.73	20,966	4.49	17,109	3.66	8,524	1.82	3,058	0.65	17,100	3.66
Kamchatka Oblast	108,057	71.82	13,910	9.25	8,402	5.58	7,593	5.505	3,896	2.59	1,343	0.89	6,463	4.30
Kemerovo Oblast	1,043,186	71.51	165,019	11.31	60,452	4.14	53,001	3.53	50,163	3.44	15,008	1.03	58,663	4.02
Kirov Oblast	459,684	65.52	137,593	19.61	32,212	4.59	23,192	3.31	18,435	2.63	6,807	0.97	19,202	2.74
Kostroma Oblast	219,379	69.22	58,760	18.54	10,168	3.21	8,768	2.77	7,016	2.21	3,213	1.01	7,927	2.50
Kurgan Oblast	327,005	66.94	93,588	19.16	16,955	3.47	11,486	2.35	19,518	4.00	3,523	0.72	13,022	2.67
Kursk Oblast	402,171	65.24	129,919	21.08	23,479	3.81	14,645	2.38	14,591	2.37	5,310	0.86	19,934	3.23
Leningrad Oblast	588,807	77.10	77,691	10.17	24,205	3.17	26,509	3.47	10,210	1.34	8,123	1.06	23,418	3.07
Lipetsk Oblast	399,465	63.62	133,637	21.28	24,439	3.89	14,352	2.29	16,675	2.66	4,700	0.75	28,613	4.56
Magadan Oblast	57,145	70.05	8,444	10.35	3,605	4.42	5,087	6.24	2,497	3.06	780	0.96	3,541	4.34
Moscow Oblast	2,249,167	71.12	336,441	10.64	184,077	5.82	132,942	4.20	49,743	1.57	19,318	0.61	162,251	5.13
Murmansk Oblast	314,098	74.04	34,549	8.14	16,991	4.01	21,355	5.03	10,782	2.54	4,126	0.97	20,325	4.79
Nizhny Novgorod Oblast	1,051,605	65.88	274,862	17.22	62,875	3.94	81,432	5.10	35,136	2.20	12,436	0.78	66,503	4.17
Novgorod Oblast	214,103	71.74	41,481	13.90	10,508	3.52	10,585	3.55	7,245	2.43	2,501	0.84	10,334	3.46
Novosibirsk Oblast	795,509	63.10	272,222	21.59	56,036	4.44	54,830	4.35	22,122	1.75	7,680	0.61	39,453	3.13
Omsk Oblast	699,374	67.03	181,589	17.40	38,408	3.68	42,104	4.04	32,372	3.10	7,755	0.74	32,655	3.13
Orenburg Oblast	612,399	58.79	255,960	24.57	52,017	4.99	27,684	2.66	38,258	3.67	7,597	0.73	37,834	3.63
Oryol Oblast	323,066	61.66	125,903	24.03	20,365	3.89	13,202	2.52	12,009	2.29	4,034	0.77	20,092	3.83
Penza Oblast	477,530	64.56	149,092	20.16	41,559	5.62	18,422	2.49	16,472	2.23	5,380	0.73	23,003	3.11
Perm Oblast	905,707	72.75	125,678	10.10	46,691	3.75	64,463	5.18	32,884	2.64	12,700	1.02	46,954	3.77
Pskov Oblast	265,503	70.79	62,389	16.64	13,106	3.49	11,732	3.13	6,076	1.62	4,411	1.18	9,348	2.49
Rostov Oblast	1,716,325	72.49	336,636	14.22	87.455	3.69	71,206	3.01	55,200	2.33	14,524	0.51	71,108	3.00
Ryazan Oblast	444,939	73.22	83,256	13.70	26,178	4.31	16,205	2.67	10,195	1.68	3,852	0.63	16,509	2.72
Samara Oblast	921,135	63.28	278,371	19.12	68,149	4.68	62,723	4.31	34,194	2.35	13,953	0.96	60,695	4.17
Saratov Oblast	1,017,875	70.79	244,829	17.03	46,051	3.20	36,804	2.56	26,770	1.86	9,055	0.63	42,412	2.95
Sakhalin Oblast	154,204	68.41	31,772	14.10	9,208	4.09	11,292	5.01	5,801	2.57	1,609	0.71	9,677	4.29
Sverdlovsk Oblast	1,506,293	76.34	153,519	7.78	70,906	3.59	109,935	5.57	43,118	2.19	13,147	0.67	55,746	2.83
Smolensk Oblast	314,778	64.91	101,276	20.88	17,902	3.69	14,651	3.02	11,477	2.37	3,796	0.78	17,932	3.70
Tambov Oblast	397,402	63.62	151,831	24.31	19,317	3.09	13,100	2.10	12,337	1.98	3,675	0.59	20,892	3.34
Tomsk Oblast	332,703	67.15	66,185	13.36	18,428	3.72	32,679	6.60	12,172	2.46	5,481	1.11	24,199	4.88
Tula Oblast	482,853	65.50	136,126	18.46	37,498	5.09	23,868	3.24	14,465	1.96	4,494	0.61	32,702	4.44
Tver Oblast	462,268	70.59	100,777	15.39	26,079	3.98	22,820	3.48	12,371	1.89	5,146	0.79	22,402	3.42
Tyumen Oblast	551,259	73.59	84,047	11.22	276,617	3.69	27,484	3.67	21,028	2.81	6,095	0.81	25,493	3.40
Ulyanovsk Oblast	443,386	65.91	129,554	19.26	37,905	5.63	15,692	2.33	14,041	2.09	5,657	0.84	18,996	2.82
Vladimir Oblast	474,175	68.83	106,465	15.45	30,336	4.40	20,589	2.99	16,561	2.40	5,908	0.86	28,611	4.15
Volgograd Oblast	707,613	63.03	246,482	21.95	46,503	4.14	41,324	3.68	24,858	2.21	8,288	0.74	38,620	3.44
Vologda Oblast	469,296	75.77	71,269	11.51	19,583	3.16	20,106	3.25	11,439	1.85	6,500	1.05	16,664	2.69
Voronezh Oblast	786,049	65.28	264,366	21.96	40,620	3.37	35,296	2.93	26,642	2.21	10,518	0.87	32,123	2.67
Yaroslavl Oblast	453,695	70.81	78,009	12.18	31,279	4.88	28,293	4.42	13,988	2.18	5,889	0.92	22,735	3.55
Moscow	2,841,620	68.61	306,085	7.39	260,438	6.29	339,496	8.20	51,068	1.23	25,708	0.62	273,465	6.60
Saint Petersburg	1,566,995	75.12	154,124	7.39	86,259	4.14	140,669	6.74	16,740	0.80	30,475	1.46	80,556	3.86
Jewish Autonomous Oblast	61,590	67.87	14,036	15.47	2,953	3.25	3,701	4.08	3,015	3.32	877	0.97	3,580	3.95
Agin-Buryat Autonomous Okrug	27,937	84.25	2,593	7.82	552	1.66	1,073	3.24	394	1.19	198	0.60	190	0.57
Chukotka Autonomous Okrug	27,912	87.24	987	3.08	919	2.25	969	3.03	446	1.39	209	0.65	542	1.69
Evenki Autonomous Okrug	6,281	81.09	336	4.34	353	4.56	343	4.43	108	1.39	55	0.71	224	2.89
Khanty-Mansi Autonomous Okrug	480,740	74.84	47,787	7.44	22,526	3.51	33,725	5.25	18,856	2.94	4,415	0.69	29,862	4.65
Komi-Permyak Autonomous Okrug	48,091	80.55	6,232	10.44	945	1.58	1,314	2.20	1,087	1.82	661	1.11	732	1.23
Koryak Autonomous Okrug	11,050	84.34	641	4.89	310	2.37	428	3.27	218	1.66	104	0.79	163	1.24
Nenets Autonomous Okrug	14,944	76.90	1,638	8.43	520	2.68	764	3.93	391	2.01	246	1.27	770	3.96
Taymyr Autonomous Okrug	15,786	79.05	779	3.90	858	4.30	1,114	5.58	445	2.23	167	0.84	701	3.51
Ust-Orda Buryat Autonomous Okrug	43,478	72.76	8,569	14.34	1,271	2.13	2,888	4.83	1,347	2.25	559	0.94	748	1.25
Yamalo-Nenets Autonomous Okrug	245,984	84.50	11,433	3.93	6,925	2.38	10,893	3.94	4,281	1.47	1,378	0.47	8,321	2.86
Baikonur (Kazakhstan)	12,970	83.62	624	4.02	407	2.62	536	3.46	170	1.10	113	0.73	595	3.84
Expatriate voting	232,505	85.13	13,190	4.83	6,522	2.39	10,979	4.02	1,729	0.63	1,165	0.43	5,537	2.03
Source: CEC
