= Vladislav Davankov =

Russian politician (born 1984)

Vladislav Davankov MP
- Владислав Даванков
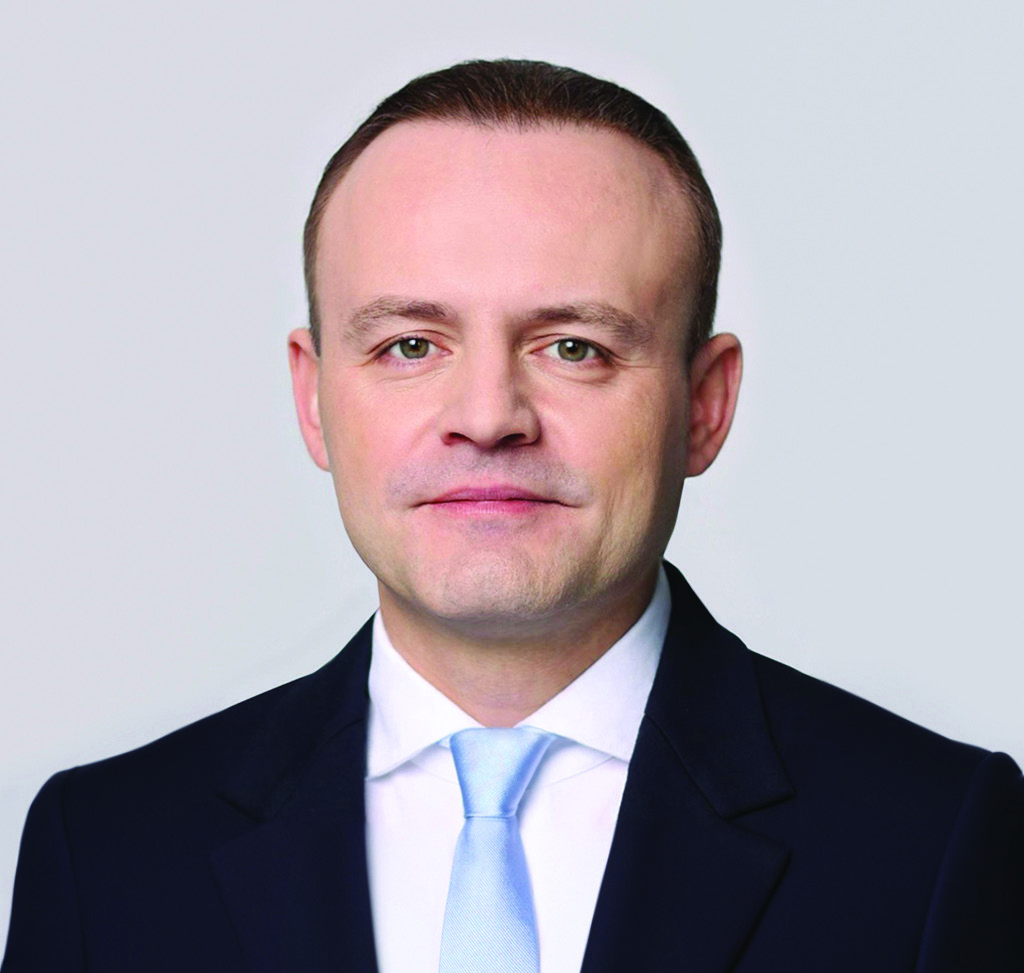
- Davankov in 2024

Vice Chairman of the State Duma
- Incumbent
- Assumed office 12 October 2021
- Chairman: Vyacheslav Volodin

Member of the State Duma (Party List Seat)
- Incumbent
- Assumed office 12 October 2021

Personal details
- Born: 25 February 1984 (age 42) Smolensk, RSFSR, USSR
- Party: New People
- Education: Moscow State University
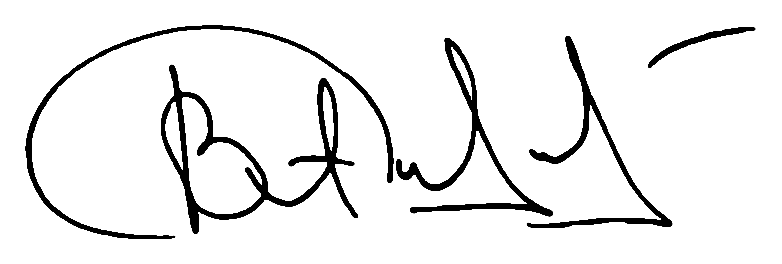
- Signature

Vladislav Andreyevich Davankov (Russian: Владислав Андреевич Даванков; born 25 February 1984 in Smolensk) is a Russian politician serving as Vice Chair of the State Duma since 2021. Davankov sits in the State Duma with the liberal-oriented New People caucus, which, with him as a key member, was the only parliamentary party to not support the independence of the Donetsk and Luhansk regions from Ukraine in the prelude to the Russian invasion.

Davankov was running as a candidate in the 2024 Russian presidential election, and announced in February 2024 that he was in favour of "peace and negotiations, but on our terms, and without a rollback" on the war in Ukraine, as well as the ending of unnecessary censorship. The Kremlin reportedly attempted to stop him from becoming a candidate due to his relatively youthful age contrasting with the aging 71-year-old authoritarian president Vladimir Putin. He has thus been described as both "the most liberal candidate on the ballot" and "the most likely to become the alternative-to-Putin candidate", with some polls showing him in second place behind Putin. It has been noted that he has previously taken conservative stances on issues, such as playing a key role in introducing a bill to make gender transition illegal. As part of his campaign, he also stated that he opposed the use of cheap migrant labour in Russia.

According to the official results, Davankov finished third, earning 3.9% of the vote. However, he performed better abroad, winning majorities in several countries. He conceded his defeat and affirmed his support for Putin and the war the following day.

== Early life ==
Born in Smolensk, Davankov later moved to Moscow, where he graduated from Moscow State University. He graduated in 2006 from the Faculty of History. His father was a military pilot.

== Business career ==
Following his graduation, Davankov started working at a direct sales company ("Faberlic") founded by Alexey Nechayev. Davankov rose up the corporate ladder of the company to become its Vice President in 2013.

== Political career ==
In 2020, Nechayev founded the New People political party, and appointed Davankov as the head of its Central Executive Committee. At the 2021 Russian legislative election, Davankov was elected to the State Duma. Duma chairman Vyacheslav Volodin then appointed Davankov deputy chair, a move set by the precedent that sees at least one deputy chair appointed per political bloc.

Davankov's party opposed mandatory vaccinations during the 2020-21 coronavirus pandemic. In the prelude to the Russian invasion of Ukraine, New People was the only party in the Duma to abstain in the vote on the recognition of Donetsk and Luhansk as states independent from Ukraine. He was nonetheless placed on the sanctions list of the United Kingdom along with other lawmakers.

In the State Duma, he was a lead figure in the creation of a law protecting people's online data. After Russia introduced partial mobilisation in the context of the invasion of Ukraine, Davankov organised a support service for those had been mobilized incorrectly and illegally, which his party said "helped return home hundreds of illegally mobilized Muscovites". He also introduced a bill allowing entrepreneurs and farmers to defer from conscription, and worked on initiatives to allow recent school graduates at university to also defer as well as fathers with many children and guardians of sick parents. Other laws he worked on were ones to abolish COVID-19 fines and extend the May holidays.

In August 2023, Davankov led an appeal against the banning of Western films Barbie and Oppenheimer, which had been prohibited from being shown in Russia by the Russian Culture Ministry for supposedly 'not meeting the traditional and moral values of Russia'. Davankov had instead suggested that they could be allowed to be shown but that "compulsory licenses" should be given to films and products from "unfriendly countries". However, this appeal was rejected.

In 2023, Davankov unsuccessfully ran in the Moscow mayoral race, an election notable for its controversial use of electronic voting. He scored 5.38% per official results.

=== 2024 Russian presidential election ===
Davankov was a candidate at the 2024 Russian presidential election. Despite his candidacy, he also signed his name in support of anti-war activist Boris Nadezhdin’s candidacy, arguing that the country should allow great ballot access to all candidates. On 15 February 2024, Davankov released his electoral manifesto, calling for 'peace and negotiations' in regards to the war in Ukraine. He proposed ending government censorship, describing it as "cancel culture", and compared it to "the worst Soviet repression”. He said that while those who are actively calling for the destruction of Russia should be prosecuted and punished, those who merely have a critical opinion should not be. He criticised these "repressive norms" used to persecute those who are opposed to the regime, and also advocates guaranteeing journalists immunity from prosecution in order to protect press freedoms. Independent Russian newspaper Novaya Gazeta observed that Davankov's policy promises "appeared to confirm his status as the most liberal candidate on the ballot", although he had previously voiced his support for the war in Ukraine and had helped introduce a law change making it illegal for transgender people to medically transition.

The Centre for European Policy Analysis observed that Davankov would have provided an outlet for skeptics of the war in Ukraine after the rejection of the anti-war candidate Boris Nadezhdin. The Kremlin reportedly feared Davankov's candidacy in the election and his youthfulness compared to Putin, and so had unsuccessfully tried to interfere and get an "older and less charismatic stand-in" to replace him. A state-run poll showed Davankov second after Putin in the election race, and the CEPA observed that "should Nadezhdin’s followers come out and push Davankov above 10%, the Kremlin may very well find itself having to recalibrate its propaganda about the war, at the very least". The Carnegie Endowment for International Peace said that Davankov's campaign would have also posed Putin with difficulties, as he is a youthful newbie who may attract interest from voters as a fresh face and negatively draw attention to the advanced age of 71-year-old Putin.

Davankov has been described as "the most likely to become the alternative-to-Putin candidate". Davankov is also campaigning for economic decentralisation and modernisation, and an increase in money for the education and health budgets. On a visit to the city of Krasnogorsk, which had previously seen social tensions with migrants, Davankov said that Russian industry should focus on automation and new technologies instead of utilising cheap migrant labour. Davankov said he will not criticize his political opponents.

== Assessments ==
According to Andrey Pertsev, a special correspondent for Meduza, Vladislav Davankov is the nephew of Alexander Davankov, a friend of Alexey Nechayev, chairman of the New People party, and his business partner in Faberlic. According to Pertsev, Alexander Davankov helped introduce Nechayev to the Kovalchuk family and to the head of the domestic policy bloc of the Presidential Administration, which resulted in Nechayev receiving support from the Kremlin.
