= Director of the Federal Security Service =

Head of Russia's principal security agency

Director of the Federal Security Service of Russia
- Директор Федеральной Службы Безопасности (Russian)
- Coat of Arms of the Federal Security Service

- Flag of the Director of the FSB

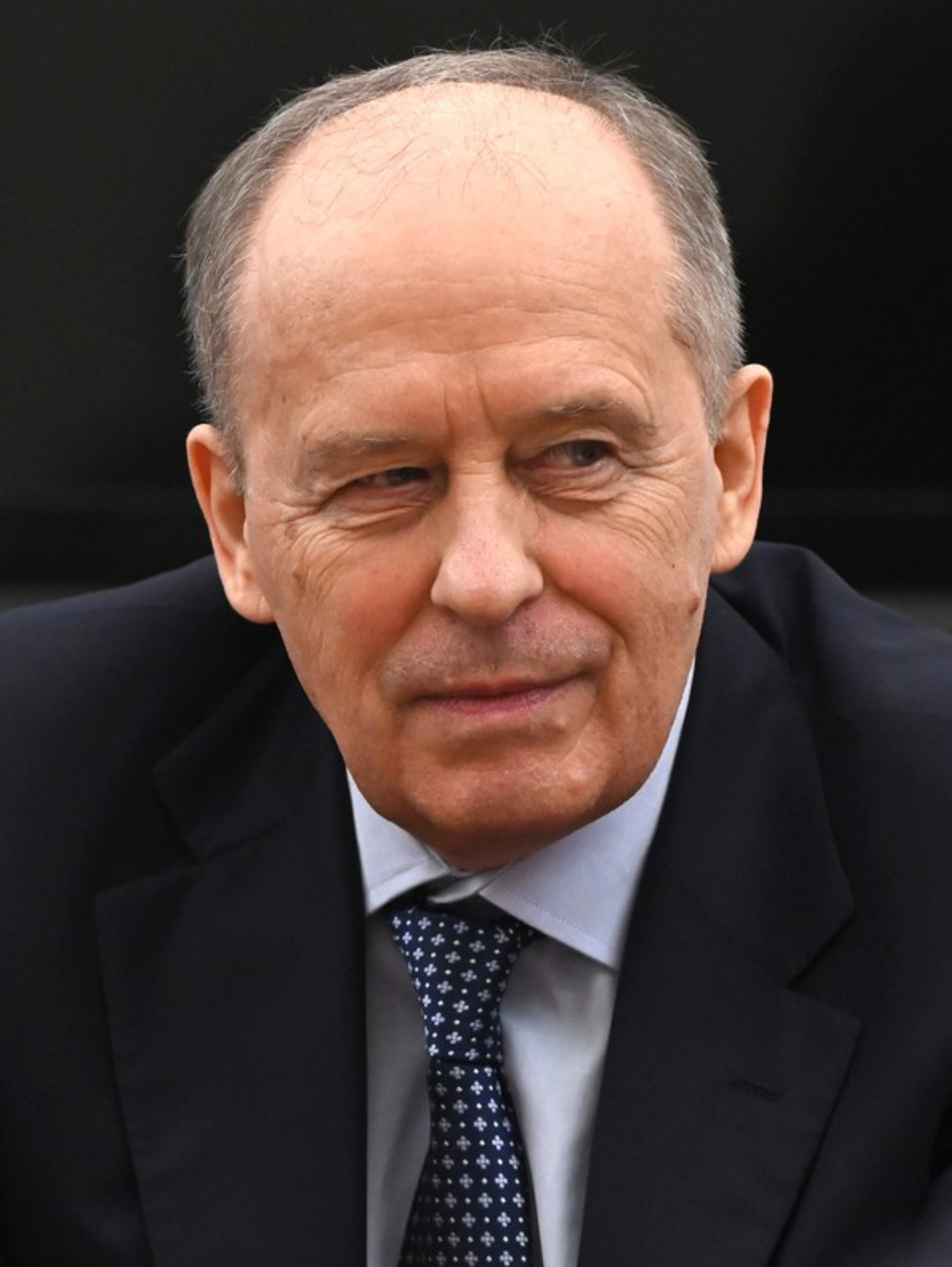
- Incumbent; Alexander Bortnikov since 12 May 2008
- Federal Security Service
- Reports to: President of Russia
- Residence: Lubyanka Building, Moscow
- Appointer: President; with confirmation by the Federation Council
- Precursor: Chairman of the KGB
- Formation: 12 April 1995
- First holder: Nikolai Golushko (FSK)
- Deputy: First Deputy Director, Sergei Korolev
- Website: www.fsb.ru

The Director of Russia's Federal Security Service (Russian: Директор Федеральной Службы Безопасности) is the head and chief executive officer of the Federal Security Service, which is one of several Russian intelligence agencies. The Director of FSB reports directly to the president of Russia. The Director is assisted by the Deputy Director of the FSB.

The Director is a civilian or a general of the armed forces nominated by the president, with the concurring or nonconcurring recommendation from the Secretary of the Security Council of Russia and must be confirmed by a majority vote of the Federation Council.

== List ==
=== KGB of the RSFSR (1991) / Federal Security Agency of the RSFSR/Russia (1991 – 1992) / Ministry of Security (1992 – 1993) / Federal Counterintelligence Service (1993 – 1995) ===
No.	Portrait	Name (born–died)	Term of office			President(s)	Ref.
No.	Portrait	Name (born–died)	Took office	Left office	Time in office	President(s)	Ref.
1		Viktor Ivanenko (1947–2022)	5 May 1991	15 January 1992	255 days	Boris Yeltsin	
2		Viktor Barannikov (1940–1995)	15 January 1992	27 July 1993	1 year, 193 days	Boris Yeltsin	
3		Nikolai Golushko (1937–2025)	28 July 1993	28 February 1994	215 days	Boris Yeltsin	
4		Sergei Stepashin (born 1952)	3 March 1994	12 April 1995	1 year, 40 days	Boris Yeltsin	

=== Federal Security Service (since 1995) ===
No.	Portrait	Name (born–died)	Term of office			President(s)	Ref.
No.	Portrait	Name (born–died)	Took office	Left office	Time in office	President(s)	Ref.
1		Sergei Stepashin (born 1952)	12 April 1995	30 June 1995	79 days	Boris Yeltsin	
—		Anatoly Safonov (born 1945) acting	30 June 1995	24 July 1995	24 days	Boris Yeltsin	
2		Mikhail Barsukov (born 1947)	24 July 1995	20 June 1996	332 days	Boris Yeltsin	
3		Nikolai Kovalyov (1949–2019)	20 June 1996	25 July 1998	2 years, 35 days	Boris Yeltsin	
4		Vladimir Putin (born 1952)	25 July 1998	9 August 1999	1 year, 15 days	Boris Yeltsin	
5		Nikolai Patrushev (born 1951)	9 August 1999	12 May 2008	8 years, 277 days	Boris Yeltsin	
5		Nikolai Patrushev (born 1951)	9 August 1999	12 May 2008	8 years, 277 days	Vladimir Putin	
6		Alexander Bortnikov (born 1951)	12 May 2008	Incumbent	18 years, 179 days	Dmitry Medvedev	
6		Alexander Bortnikov (born 1951)	12 May 2008	Incumbent	18 years, 179 days	Vladimir Putin	

== See also ==
- Director of the Foreign Intelligence Service
