= Federal Counterintelligence Service =

Russian security agency (1993–1995)

Federal Counterintelligence Service of the Russian Federation
- Федеральная служба контрразведки Российской Федерации
- Emblem of the Military Counterintelligence Department

Agency overview
- Formed: 21 December 1993
- Preceding agencies: State Security Committee of the RSFSR; Federal Security Agency of the RSFSR; Ministry of Security of the Russian Federation
- Dissolved: June 23, 1995
- Superseding agency: Federal Security Service
- Type: Independent
- Jurisdiction: Russia
- Headquarters: 24 Kuznetsky Most, Moscow, Russia
- Agency executive: Sergei Stepashin, Director

The Federal Counterintelligence Service of the Russian Federation (FSK RF; Russian: Федеральная служба контрразведки Российской Федерации, IPA: [fʲɪdʲɪˈralʲnəjə ˈsluʐbə kəntrɐzˈvʲetkʲɪ rɐˈsʲijskəj fʲɪdʲɪˈratsɨɪ]) was the main security agency of Russia. It superseded the Ministry of Security of the Russian Federation , and was an overall successor agency to the Soviet Union's KGB, which had dissolved two years prior to the FSK’s creation. It existed from 1993 to 1995, when it was reorganized into the Federal Security Service (FSB).

== Origin ==
On November 26, 1991, the President of the RSFSR Boris Yeltsin issued a decree on the transformation of the KGB of the RSFSR into the Federal Security Agency of the RSFSR (AFB). On January 24, 1992, by decree of the President of Russia, the Ministry of Security of the Russian Federation was created on the basis of the abolished Federal Security Agency of the RSFSR and the Inter-Republican Security Service of the USSR (short-lived successor to KGB).

On December 21, 1993, by decree of the President of the Russian Federation, the Ministry of Security was abolished and the Federal Counterintelligence Service of the Russian Federation (FSK) was created in its place.

== Directors of the KGB of the RSFSR /AFB / Ministers of security / Directors of the FSK ==
- Viktor Ivanenko (May 1991 – January 1992)
- Viktor Barannikov (January 1992 – July 1993)
- Nikolai Golushko (July 1993 – February 1994)
- Sergei Stepashin (February 1994 – April 1995)

== Structure ==
- Directorate of Counterintelligence Operations
- Directorate for Counterintelligence Support of Strategic Facilities
- Directorate of Military Counterintelligence
- Directorate of Economic Counterintelligence
- Counter-Terrorism Directorate
- Information and Analytical Department
- Operational Search Department
- Organizational and Inspection Department
- Directorate of Operational and Technical Measures
- Scientific and Technical Support Department
- Human Resources Management
- Internal Security Directorate
- Secretariat
- Contractual and legal management
- Registration and Archival Collections Department
- Directorate of Cipher and Special Communications (since July 1994)
- Public Relations Center
- Logistics Directorate
- Financial and Economic Management
- Military Medical Directorate
- Military Construction Directorate

== Restructuring into FSB ==
The FSK was renamed the FSB (Federal'naya Sluzhba Bezopasnosti Rossiyskoi Federatsii (Федера́льная слу́жба безопа́сности Росси́йской Федера́ции) Federal Security Service of the Russian Federation) by the Federal Law of April 3, 1995, "On the Organs of the Federal Security Service in the Russian Federation" and the Decree of the President of the Russian Federation of June 23, 1995, making the new FSB a more powerful organization.
