= Serhii Braiko =

Russian-Ukrainian politician (born 1957)

- Сергій Брайко
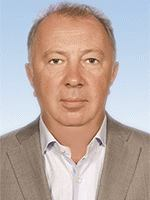
- An official photo of him from 2012.

People's Deputy of Ukraine
- In office 12 December 2012 – 27 November 2014
- Preceded by: Constituency created
- Succeeded by: Post vacant
- Constituency: Autonomous Republic of Crimea, No. 4

Mayor of Yalta
- In office 2002 – 31 October 2010
- Succeeded by: Oleksiy Boyarchuk

Personal details
- Born: Serhii Borisovich Braiko; 8 December 1957 (age 68) Novosibirsk, Russian SFSR, Soviet Union
- Party: Social Democratic Party of Ukraine (united) (2002-2006); Party of Regions (2006-2014)
- Education: Krasnoyarsk State University (1988)

Serhii Borisovich Braiko (Ukrainian: Сергій Борисович Брайко; Russian: Сергей Борисович Брайко; born 8 December 1957) is a Russian and formerly Ukrainian politician who served as a People's Deputy of Ukraine in the Verkhovna Rada representing the 7th convocation from 2012 to its premature end in 2014 with the Party of Regions. Prior to this, he served as Mayor of Yalta. During the 2014 Russian annexation of Crimea, he sided with Russia. Afterwards, he remained in politics in Yalta until 2016.

== Early life ==
Braiko was born on 8 November 1957 in the city of Novosibirsk, which was then part of the Russian SFSR in the Soviet Union. After graduating from secondary school, he immediately did his mandatory service in the Soviet Army, graduating in 1980. Afterwards, he returned to Russia to work as a locksmith-repairman and later apparatus operator at the Electrochemical Plant of Novosibirsk. He left in 1982 to briefly work as a courier at the Central People's Court of Novosibirsk. Braiko then became an education inspector at the UF 91/10, also in Novosibirsk, until 1985. Afterwards, from 1985 until 1987, he was a trainee and then an investigator at the prosecutor's office of the Novosibirsk district. After leaving, he graduated from the Krasnoyarsk State University within the Faculty of Law as a lawyer.

In 1987, he moved to Crimea in the Ukrainian SSR, working as a senior investigator at the Prosecutor's Office for the City of Yalta until 1990. Braiko then worked his way up until 1996 with the executive committee of Yalta, from head of the legal department to acting manager of affairs, then manager of affairs, then acting first deputy chairman, and then first deputy chairman. He left the job in 1996 to become director of the Oreanda Hotel in Yalta, a post he held until 2002.

== Political career ==
=== 2002-2010: Mayor of Yalta ===
==== 2002-2006: First term ====
View of Yalta in September 2002, shortly after he took office in his first term.

In 2002, he entered the race for the post of Mayor of Yalta. At the time, he headed the Yalta branch of the SDPU(o). His main opponent was Vitalina Dzoz, who was backed by the Socialist Party of Ukraine. Braiko would end up winning the race. A year later, while in office, Crimean Tatar activists began setting up sit-in tents around greater Yalta and Hurzuf, known as the "glades of protest," to demand plots as compensation in the summer of 2003. The issue was resolved on 23 July 2003, when he and Mustafa Dzhemilev signed a protocol to settle the question. However, by September there were already more land seizures reported by the Yalta government near Simeiz in the area of the mountain-forest reserve, although nothing initially came of this. Braiko subsequently had seven different criminal cases opened against him between late 2003 and 2005 by Crimean prosecutors, with the prosecutors in July 2005 issuing a decree to suspend him temporarily as Mayor of Yalta. Braiko then made Oleksandr Chabanov the acting mayor without the approval of the Yalta City Council. Although Braiko won the rulings and prosecutors did not appeal, the suspension of his mayorship was not revoked for the rest of his term.

==== 2006-2010: Second term ====
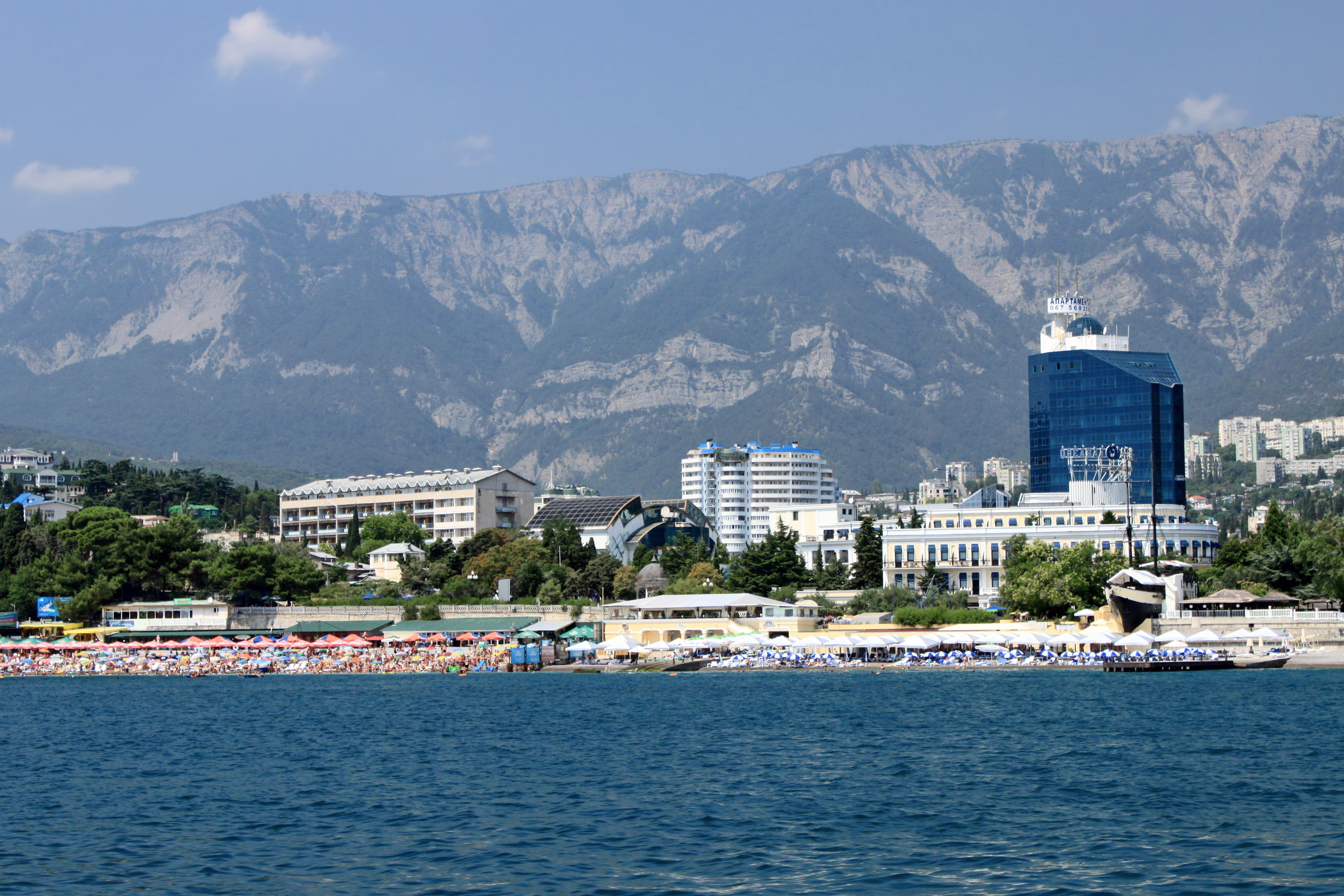
View of Yalta in July 2010, shortly before the end of his second term.

Despite the suspension, in January 2006, it was widely theorised that Braiko would run for re-election as the clear favourite, with possible challengers being Yulia Tymoshenko Bloc candidate Dubkov, Dzoz again, and Hennadii Patyk of the city land resources department. While campaigning for the post in March 2006, he backed Nataliya Vitrenko and her party, and at a rally in Yalta said that he approved of her wanting more autonomy for Crimea, the official status of the Russian language, and stronger relations with both Russia and Belarus. He blamed the Orange Revolution for causing a tourist decrease in Yalta also. He was eventually re-elected on 31 March 2006 with a majority, 51.85%, of the vote as a member of the Party of Regions, with Zubkov being the closest competitor.

Upon being re-elected, Braiko attended a seminar in Austria where it was proposed to build a ski resort near Ai-Petri. A year later, it was stated that he would turn the cargo port into a yacht marina, after the cargo port was no longer profitable and was just delivering sand. Starting in 2008, his relations with the secretary of the Yalta City Council, Oleksii Boiarchuk, started to sour after Braiko created the initiative of the territorial community "Charter of the Yalta". Boiarchuk said that the community was just a pretext to change the administrative structure in the area, while others said the initiative was only created to build more support for him in the upcoming 2010 elections. Towards the end of his second term, in June 2010, he prevented a large development plan for Greater Yalta in Moscow. The plan aimed to do the following: make it so that by 2025 Greater Yalta would receive up to 2.5 million visitors a year, invest more money into resort treatment facilities, increase foreign investment in Yalta, such as Turkish and also Russian, which he cited as the main investor, a priority development territory law for VAT and other breaks, and the creation of a cruise line from Yalta to Yevpatoria-Odesa-Sukhumi-Batumi and other Black Sea cruises.

Initially, in September 2010, Braiko said that he wanted a third term in office, but that he would abide by whatever the Party of Regions decided. This was because the party had already recommended Boiarchuk, who had become head of the Yalta branch of the party by then, as its preferred mayor. It was already reported by that time that Vasyl Dzharty had offered Braiko a post within the Crimean government instead, which was confirmed by November. Boiarchuk did indeed become mayor after him.

=== 2010-2012: Regional Crimean politics ===
On 16 November 2010, the Prime Minister of Crimea, Dzharty, listed Braiko as his candidate for the Minister of Regional Development and Construction, which was approved by the Supreme Council of Crimea. After he took office, Braiko said that developing a cadastre for Crimea would cost about 17 million hryvnias, although the 2011 Crimean budget only included 150,000 hryvnias for it. In January 2011, Braiko was included in the temporary commission creating for allocating plots to deported citizens (namely Crimean Tatars) and others in Simferopol and its surrounding areas after Dzharty had Chubarov and negotiated this. However, shortly after, the Council of Ministers of Crimea approved a draft reform that cut the number of ministers, and so Braiko lost the his position as minister, with Dzharty proposing that those who had lost their positions become first deputies to the new ministries. Braiko was then appointed first deputy minister of regional development and housing, but by November 2011, after Dzharty had died and Anatolii Mohyliov had taken over as Prime Minister, he was reinstated as the now named Minister of Regional Development and Housing and Utilities. His term eventually ended in October 2012 when he became a people's deputy since Ukraine forbids dual mandates.

=== 2012-2014: Verkhovna Rada ===
In 2012, during the upcoming 2012 Ukrainian parliamentary elections, Braiko announced his intentions to run within constituency No. 7 with the Party of Regions. At the time of its formation in 2012, the 7th district covered the cities of Yalta and Alushta, along with their surrounding metropolitan areas. During the campaign season, he spent more than half a million hryvnias, of which most came from personal donors and Braiko himself. In the end, Braiko was elected with a majority of 52.21% (32,366 people) against the Communist Party of Ukraine candidate Viktor Rafalovych at 12.58% (7,800 people) and the Batkivshchyna candidate Yurii Formus at 9.48% (5,877 people). He was the first majoritarian from Crimea to be announced that he won. Upon joining the Rada, Braiko joined the Party of Regions faction and was appointed Chairman of the Subcommittee on Legal Policy, Regulatory, and Legal Acts within the Committee on Issues of Legal Policy.

=== Russian annexation of Crimea ===
Braiko speaking in Yalta in 2016.

After the 2014 Russian annexation of Crimea, while still a deputy, he was appointed First Deputy Mayor of Yalta after Oleksandr Olefir was dismissed in April. This was technically illegal according to Ukrainian law, since it was a dual mandate, but it was justified by the Yalta City Council as being an extraordinary circumstance. Responding to an interview with the Ukrainian newspaper "Glavcom" in June, Braiko said that he had already taken Russian citizenship and would not continue politics in Russia. It was also confirmed that he had earlier written a letter of resignation, which was considered on 13 May, but the vote to strip his mandate was not confirmed. According to Braiko, he said the annexation was calm and that there were no issues, that the annexation was not an occupation, and that the referendum for the annexation was conducted fairly and that residents were happy they were Russian. Despite his statements in the interview that he did not consider himself a member of the Verkhovna Rada any longer, he left the Party of Regions and joined the "For Peace and Stability" faction in July. In August 2014, he was appointed Deputy Mayor of Yalta, and he again confirmed his resignation from the Verkhovna Rada on 18 September 2014 in a press conference.

=== Career in Russia ===
After his term in the Verkhovna Rada, he retained his post of Deputy Mayor of Yalta. After the then mayor Serhiy Ilash, who was previously secretary of the city council, resigned in late April he also became de facto Mayor of Yalta again, until Andrey Rostenko was appointed to the position, with Braiko then demoted down to First Deputy Mayor of Yalta under him. During his time in office, he was mostly focused on population growth, with Braiko saying in July 2016 that the population was "growing" due to migrants. After more than two years in office, Braiko resigned as First Deputy Mayor of Yalta on 3 November 2016. The reaction to his resignation after many years was divided: some said that the de facto Mayor of Yalta, Andrey Rostenko, was trying to squeeze people out of the leadership as part of a power struggle, while others said that Braiko himself had been involved in "sabotage". There were also rumours that Braiko had resigned to avoid criminal prosecution. After this, he retired from politics.

== Personal life ==
He is married and has four children from two marriages. With his first wife, he had a son and a daughter, with the son working at the Embassy of Ukraine in Russia, and the daughter, Anna, living in Vancouver, Canada, with her mother. With his second wife, Larisa, who is originally from Dnipro but moved to Yalta, he had one son Ivan and an adopted daughter Masha from Larisa's first marriage.

Braiko owns a dacha on Ai-Petri, two apartments, and a house in the village of Orlin (near Sevastopol), as of 2012.

== Honours and awards ==
Braiko has been awarded the following honours and awards:

- Honored Worker of the Service Sector of Ukraine (2002)
- Gratitude of the Chairman of the Council of Ministers of the Autonomous Republic of Crimea (2003, 2005)
- Order of the Commonwealth (from CIS, 2004)
- Order of Merit, III degree (2008)
