= Vladimir Putin's rise to power =

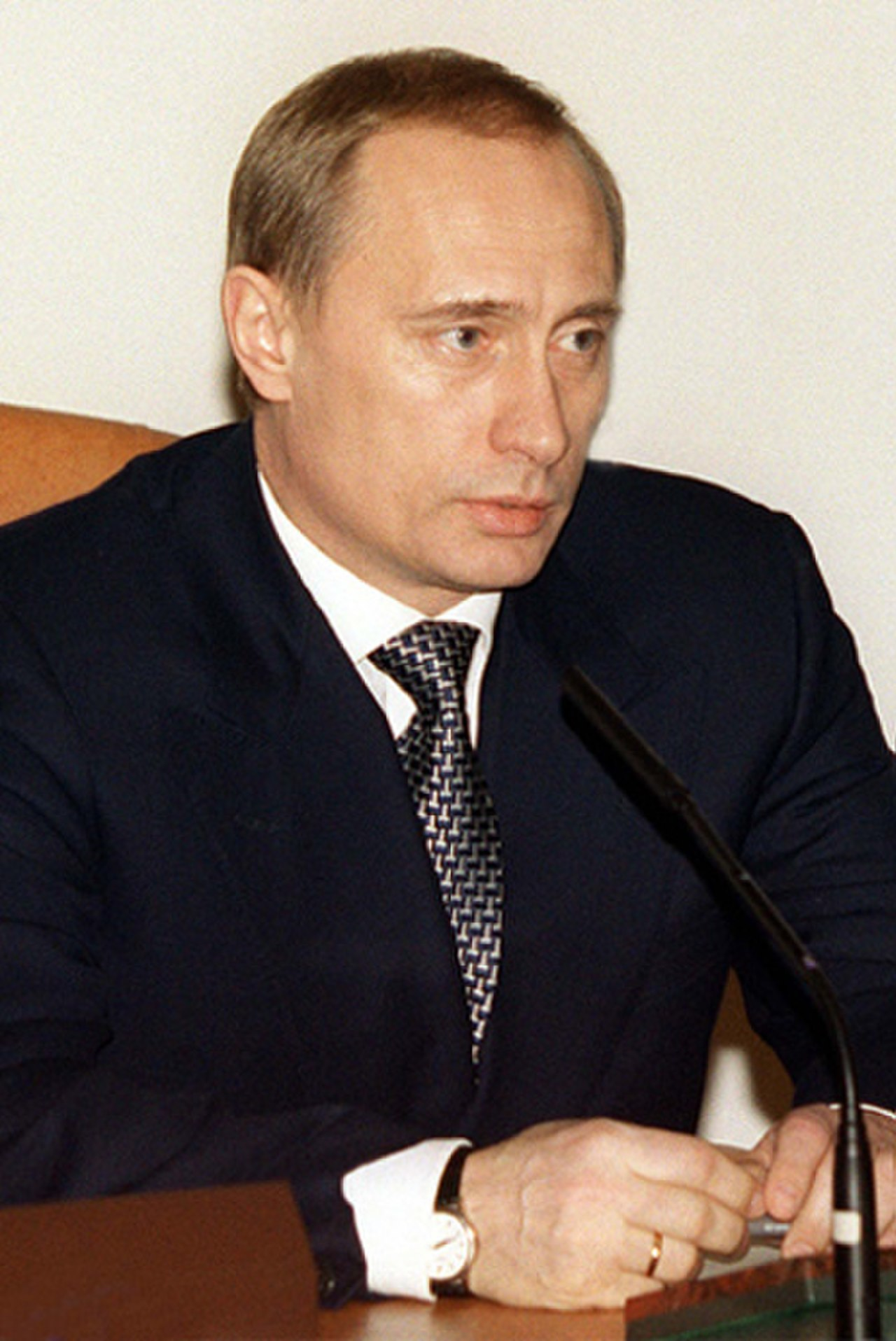
Vladimir Putin as acting president of Russia, 31 December 1999

In the early 2000s, significant political changes took place in Russia with Vladimir Putin's rise to power. He previously held key positions in security forces and government, and he became the successor to President Boris Yeltsin.

After serving as the director of the Federal Security Service and as Secretary of the Security Council in August 1999, Putin was appointed Prime Minister of Russia by Yeltsin. On 31 December 1999, following Yeltsin's resignation, Putin became acting president. He was elected to a full term as President of Russia in March 2000.

== Situation in Russia ==
The political situation in Russia in the late 1990s was characterized by social and economic instability, a rise in crime, and the weakening of state institutions both domestically and internationally. President Boris Yeltsin suffered from health problems and alcoholism. He was not eligible to run for a third term according to the Russian constitution. Yeltsin remained energetic and focused in the face of emerging problems, but when it came to the strategic development of the state, he lacked a specific plan.

There was also a growing sense of separatist sentiment in the country, especially in Chechnya, where the conflict remained unresolved. The 1998 financial crisis posed a serious challenge to Russia. Against the backdrop of the upcoming 2000 presidential elections, the political situation remained tense and uncertain.

Russia had already experienced limitations on political competition during the 1996 elections. Yeltsin's health problems also weakened his influence. His daughter and son-in-law established schemes to enrich themselves and those close to Russian oligarchs. With an impending change of power in the country, Yeltsin's family and the oligarchs feared for their finances and security, preferring to retain their power and influence. After the 1998 crisis, there were no longer advocates for democracy within Yeltsin's circle, and in 1999, those in power did not want, but rather sought the ability to choose Yeltsin's successor themselves. There was a growing demand for strengthening state power from society. Yeltsin did not see Yevgeny Primakov, who had led the government since 1998, as his successor because he was too closely associated with Gorbachev and the Soviet era. This situation created uncertainty on the eve of the transition to new leadership in the country.

== Operation "Successor" ==
Operation "Successor" was a strategic plan developed by the Russian president Boris Yeltsin and his inner circle to prepare a successor for the presidency. A distinctive feature of this operation was the lack of broad public involvement in choosing the successor, which led to a halt in democratic development in the country. Yeltsin was inspired by the ideals of American president George Washington, particularly his democratic principles. Yeltsin echoed some of his democratic decisions, particularly distancing himself from any Russian political party. However, unlike Washington, who allowed Americans to freely choose their new leader upon his departure, Yeltsin chose a path that halted Russia's democratic development.

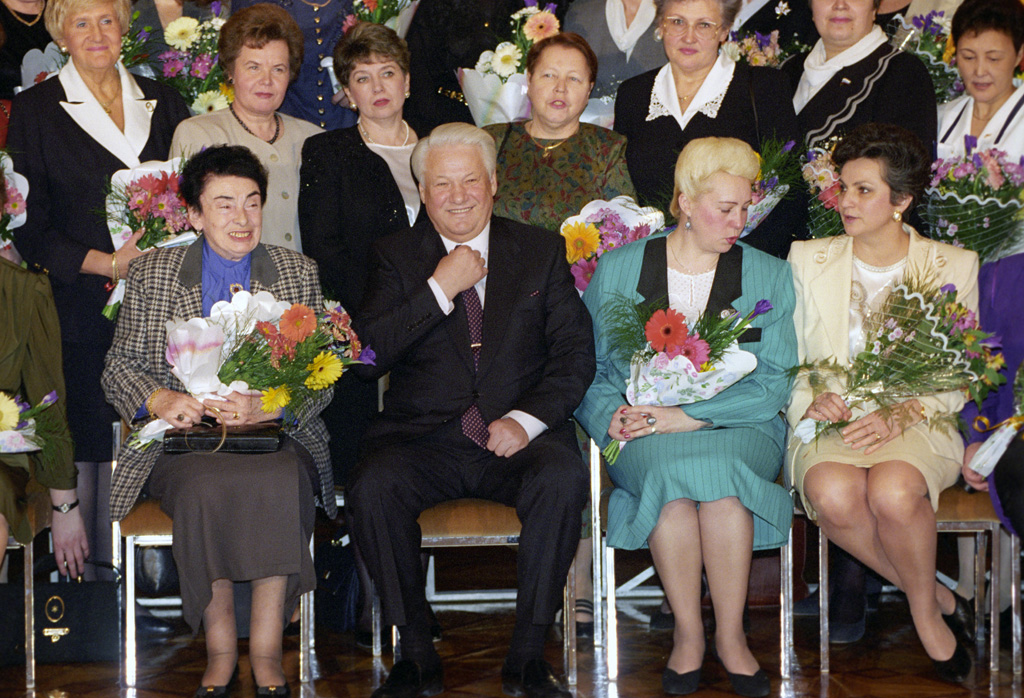
Russian president Boris Yeltsin attends festive event on the occasion of International Women's Day.

Instead of ensuring free elections, Yeltsin considered it his right and duty to choose his successor. His strategy was to prepare and introduce his successor into the political arena without diminishing his own influence on Russia's political stage. This approach was focused on maintaining stability and strengthening personal power.

This strategic decision by Yeltsin demonstrates his desire to maintain control over the political situation in Russia and ensure political protection for himself and his inner circle after stepping down as president.

The idea of the need to prepare a successor emerged within Yeltsin's circle immediately after the 1996 presidential elections, and Yeltsin himself became involved in this after the 1998 economic crisis. Yeltsin and his friendly oligarchs, known as "the family", began actively seeking a competent, reliable, loyal, and sober candidate with no past ties to Yeltsin who could strengthen the state and propose and articulate the "Russian idea".

This process involved frequent change of prime ministers, with each prime minister considered a potential presidential candidate. The changes in the head of the government allowed Yeltsin's circle to carefully select candidates for subsequent promotion to the key position. By the end of 1999, the "family" was already seriously concerned about the future and actively sought ways to ensure their candidate's ascent to power.

Operation "Successor", as it was called within Yeltsin's circle, consisted of two tasks. The first was to find a candidate not associated with Yeltsin himself. The second was to invent a problem that the "successor" would "solve," thereby gaining popularity with voters. The successor's rise to power was to be achieved using methods tested in the 1996 elections: utilizing state resources and the support of oligarchic structures with which Yeltsin and his circle had close ties.

Yeltsin had a means of selecting his successor at his disposal. This mechanism was the appointment of the prime minister, a stepping stone to the presidency. Starting with Viktor Chernomyrdin, potential presidential candidates were appointed to the position of prime minister. Since 1998, Yeltsin changed six prime ministers.

In preparation for the successor's election, Yeltsin's circle organized a public opinion poll asking, "Which movie character would you vote for in the elections?" The leader turned out to be the Soviet literary and movie character, intelligence officer Stierlitz. One of the individuals working on the "Operation Successor" was the political technologist Gleb Pavlovsky.

Among the first trial candidates was the former interior minister, justice minister and FSB director, Sergei Stepashin, who was appointed as prime minister. Yeltsin tested him for loyalty and the ability to attract voters. Stepashin, however, sought compromises with Yeltsin's opponents, indicating that he would not staunchly defend Yeltsin from his political adversaries after his departure. Stepashin failed Yeltsin's "tests".

In August 1999, Stepashin was removed from the post of prime minister, and another former FSB director, Vladimir Putin, was appointed in his place. This move was significant in the scheme of forming a future successor and indicated Yeltsin's and his circle's desire to find a leader capable of strengthening the country's political situation and ensuring their personal security and retention of influence after Yeltsin stepped down as president.

== Protection of Yeltsin's and the ruling elite's interests ==
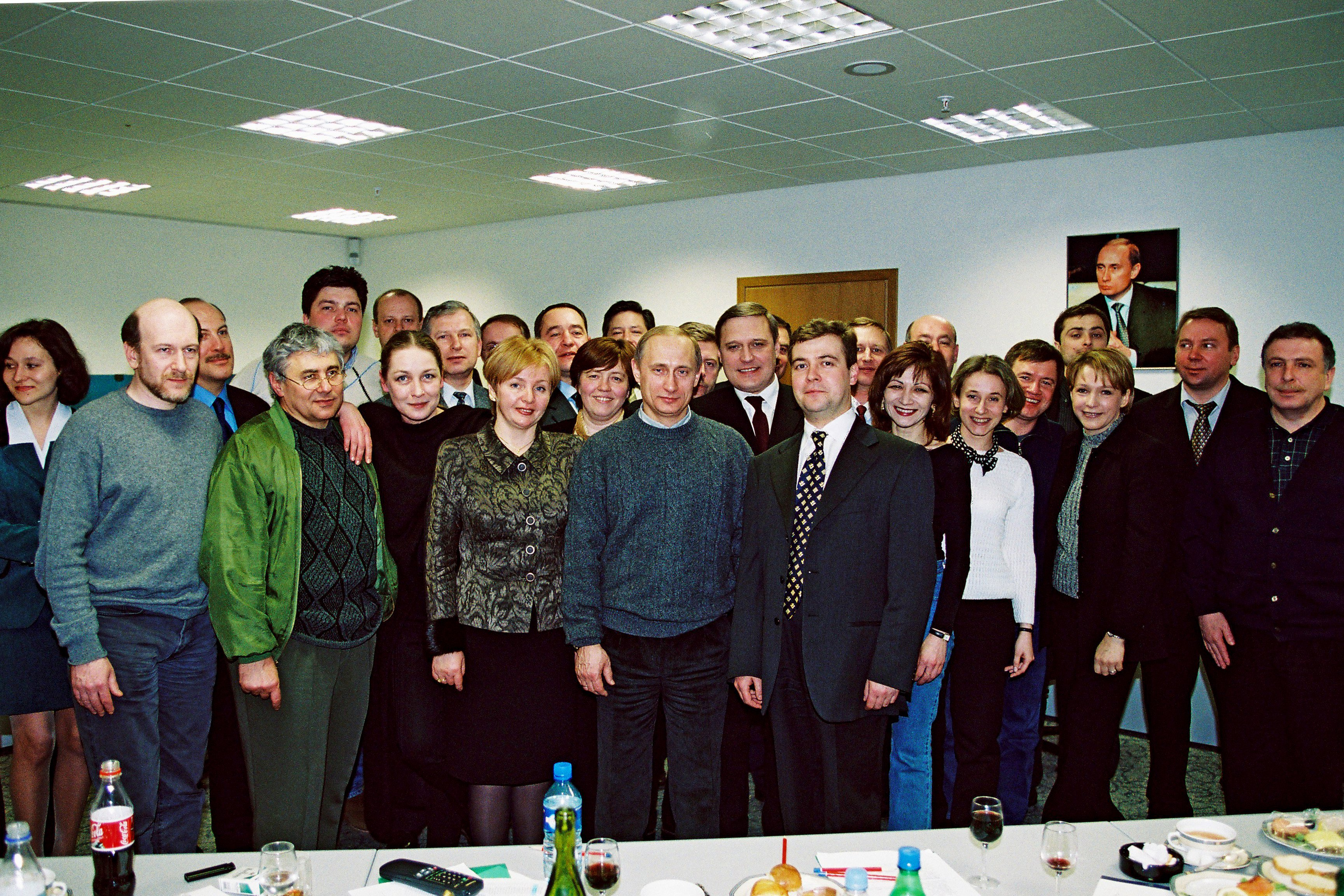
Putin's campaign team, including Yeltsin's daughter Tatyana, Yeltsin's advisor Valentin Yumashev and Yeltsin's chief of staff Aleksandr Voloshin

The ruling elite, having made antidemocratic decisions, acted out of fear for their own security and a desire to preserve their material gains. In the open political struggle, there was a danger of a hostile "president's family" coming to power, which would begin persecuting and punishing those who had worked and prospered during Yeltsin's presidency. According to some, "it was clear that revenge would come, and then Yeltsin, the 'family,' and everyone would perish," so "a scheme was needed to transfer power to a strong [president] who would guarantee Yeltsin his personal security."

Tatyana Dyachenko, Yeltsin's daughter, played an important role in the final decision to transfer power to Putin. As Yeltsin's health deteriorated, Dyachenko increasingly acted as an advisor and confidante to the president. She and her fiancé Valentin Yumashev had much to lose: they facilitated the involvement of oligarchs in governing the country and, consequently, could become the focus of the new president's attention. Yeltsin's dependence on his inner circle of allies, including his daughter, Yumashev, and possibly one or two more aides, increased as his health deteriorated. Yeltsin was more concerned about protecting his close circle than individual oligarchs. He was unhappy with the oligarchs' influence on people and the policies of his administration, but due to his declining health, he could not effectively combat the growing influence. Meanwhile, his inner circle was concerned about the welfare of their wealthy friends, who were worried about the future of their fortunes and themselves.

Thus, the consequences of the early decisions of 1992 continued to influence the political situation in Russia. The attempt to introduce a market economy without establishing democratic political and legal structures led to institutionalized corruption at the highest levels of power in the Kremlin. Liberal economic reforms without corresponding political mechanisms of accountability and control undermined the new system. By the end of Yeltsin's second presidential term, fear of retribution for corruption forced his circle to seek a new leader not based on qualifications or electoral legitimacy, but rather based on promises of protection and perhaps the hope that they could secretly control their puppet appointee.

== Vladimir Putin's career in the 1990s ==
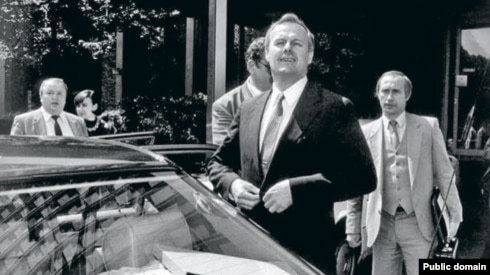
Vladimir Putin (right) with his then-boss Anatoly Sobchak in 1992

In the 1990s, Vladimir Putin, a former KGB officer, rose from the director of the Federal Security Service (FSB) to a key position in the Russian government. Putin cultivated good relations with the country's elite, including oligarchs and political figures from the Yeltsin era, which contributed to his career advancement. Putin served as an advisor to Yeltsin's key ally, St. Petersburg Mayor Anatoly Sobchak, which helped him establish connections in the political elite.

Putin's appointment as prime minister in 1999 was a recognition of his respect and support from "the family", which saw in Putin not only a successor but also a defender of Yeltsin's interests and their own. Yeltsin and his circle expected Putin to protect them from political opponents and ensure victory in elections.

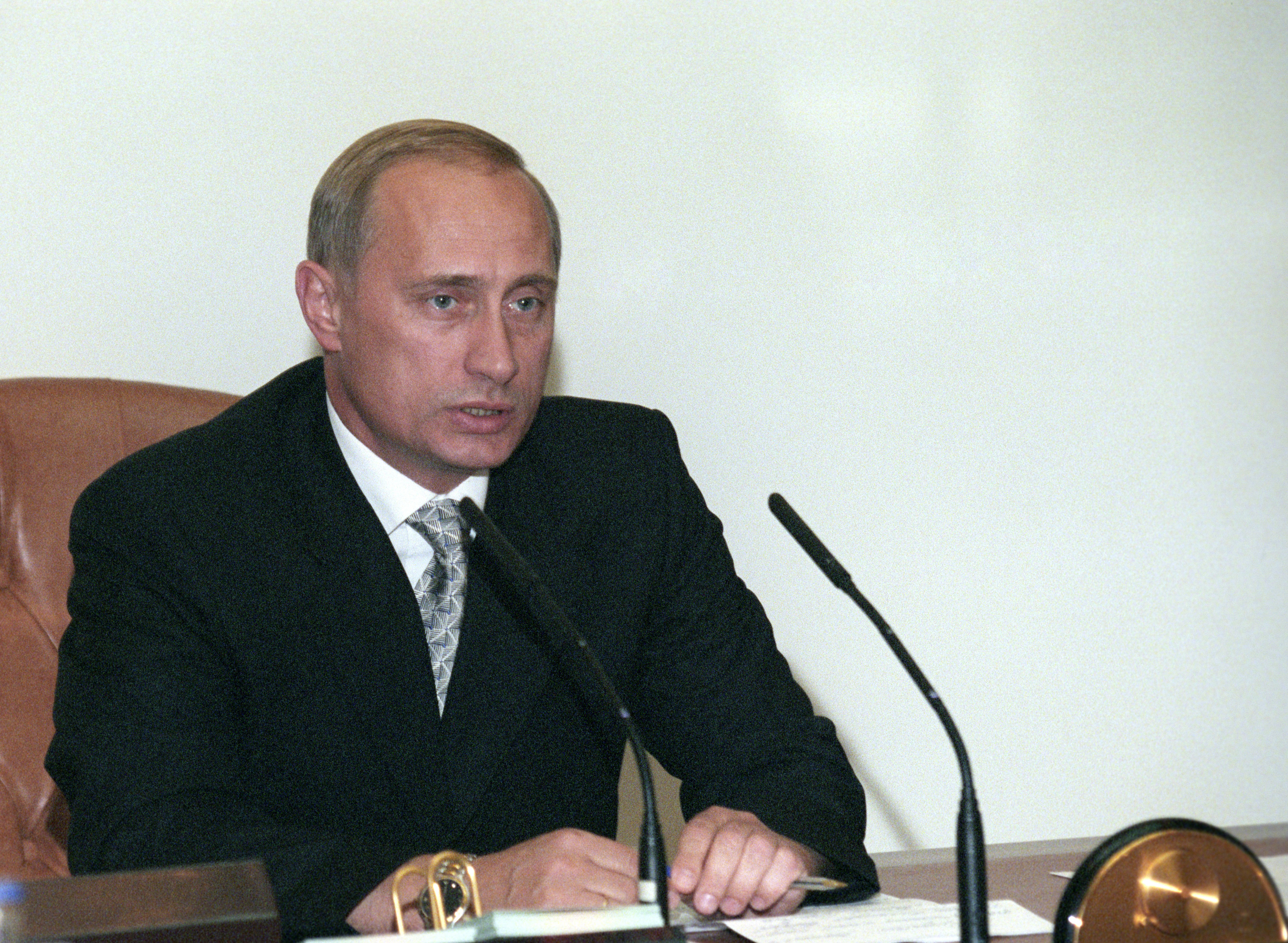
Putin on the day of his appointment as acting prime minister on August 9, 1999

Putin demonstrated his loyalty and dedication to Yeltsin even before his appointment as prime minister, while he was the director of the FSB. He assisted in the removal of Yuri Skuratov, the Prosecutor General and a critic of Yeltsin ("informally coordinating security services in the interests of Yeltsin's political opponents"), by providing compromising material. This diverted the attention of the prosecutors away from the oligarchs, securing them, and strengthened his position and Yeltsin's trust. Putin was promoted to the position of Secretary of the Security Council of Russia. Putin demonstrated his reliability and loyalty as a potential successor.

The process of transferring power to Putin was probably not fully planned in advance. Even Putin himself in December 1998 did not display confidence in his political future. At that time, he considered his participation in the government "an interesting chapter in his life" that would soon come to an end. Yeltsin announced his reluctance to run for a third presidential term, and Putin believed that his time in the government was coming to an end - "the future president, of course, would want to have a qualified person loyal to himself, it is clear that I will have to leave. Boris Nikolaevich knows that I am completely calm about this." Then, in the eyes of society and Putin himself, Yevgeny Primakov seemed the most likely successor. Putin even hoped to earn Primakov's trust and get appointed to lead his former special unit in the FSB.

Putin enjoyed active support in state and oligarch-controlled media. He was portrayed as an energetic, decisive leader capable of protecting Russia from internal and external threats. Putin's popularity soared. A relatively unknown "apparatchik" even to the Russian elite became the most popular politician in just a few months: if in August 1999 only 2% of voters were ready to vote for him, by the end of the year, support had increased to 51%. This growth was the result of active support in the media and from the oligarchic elite, which sought to preserve its influence in the future Russian political landscape.

== 1999 apartment bombings and the Chechen war ==
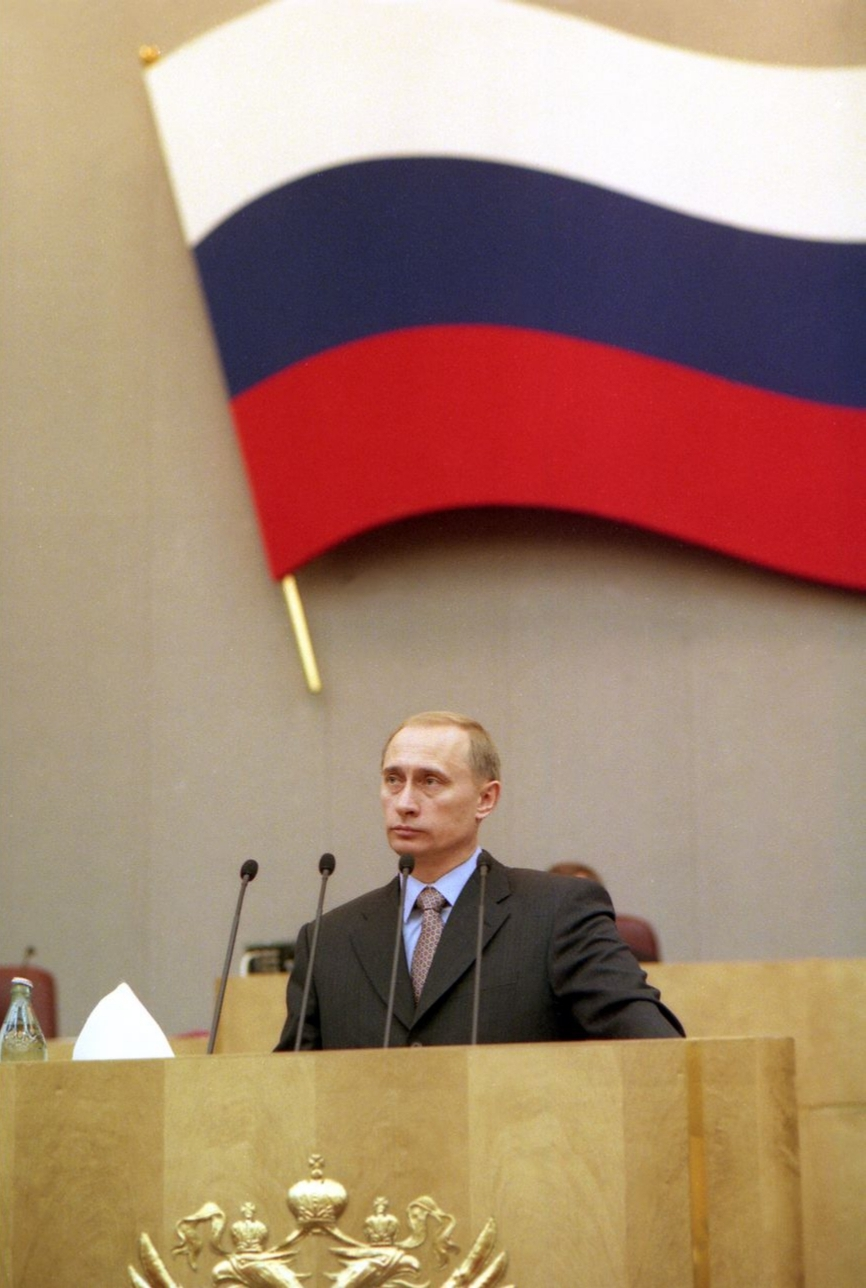
Putin giving a speech at the State Duma as prime minister on October 24, 1999

In August 1999, Yeltsin appointed Putin to lead the war against the rebellious Chechnya. Putin conducted the war with great publicity, appearing on TV and demonstrating determination to suppress the uprising.

A series of explosions of residential buildings that occurred in Russia in September 1999 is one of the most significant events preceding the start of the Second Chechen War. The suspicious nature of these explosions, which occurred in Buynaksk, Moscow and Volgodonsk, drew public attention and left many questions unanswered.

As a result of the series of coordinated explosions of multi-story residential buildings, 307 people were killed, and over 1700 were injured. These attacks not only caused panic in society but also raised questions about those responsible for the explosions. In Ryazan, local police arrested agents of the Federal Security Service (FSB), catching them planting explosives in a residential building. The FSB claimed that what happened was part of an exercise, while critics speculated about the connection of the explosions to the upcoming elections to create an atmosphere of fear to justify military actions in Chechnya.

The bombings and their possible connection to the authorities remain a subject of controversy. Some observers and experts suggest that these terrorist acts may have been initiated by the FSB to garner public support for the start of the Second Chechen War. These events provided Putin with additional grounds to launch a military operation in Chechnya, justifying it as a response to terrorist acts, although the responsibility for the bombings remained unresolved. The war against Chechnya received broad public support. The first weeks of the new military campaign appeared more successful than the first war. Russian forces quickly seized control of the Chechen capital, Grozny. The conflict was presented by Putin as a fight against terrorism, and he gained a reputation as a decisive leader restoring order and strength in the country. Such rhetoric resonated with a society tired of instability. After Putin was appointed prime minister, Yeltsin publicly announced his support for Putin as his successor. Analysts initially did not consider Putin a potential president—the only scenario that journalist Alexei Volin could imagine to "help a hopeless client with low ratings and no public image" become president was "a short victorious war." Public support for the war in Chechnya allowed him to boost his ratings—every week they increased by several percent.

== Resignation of Yeltsin and 2000 election ==
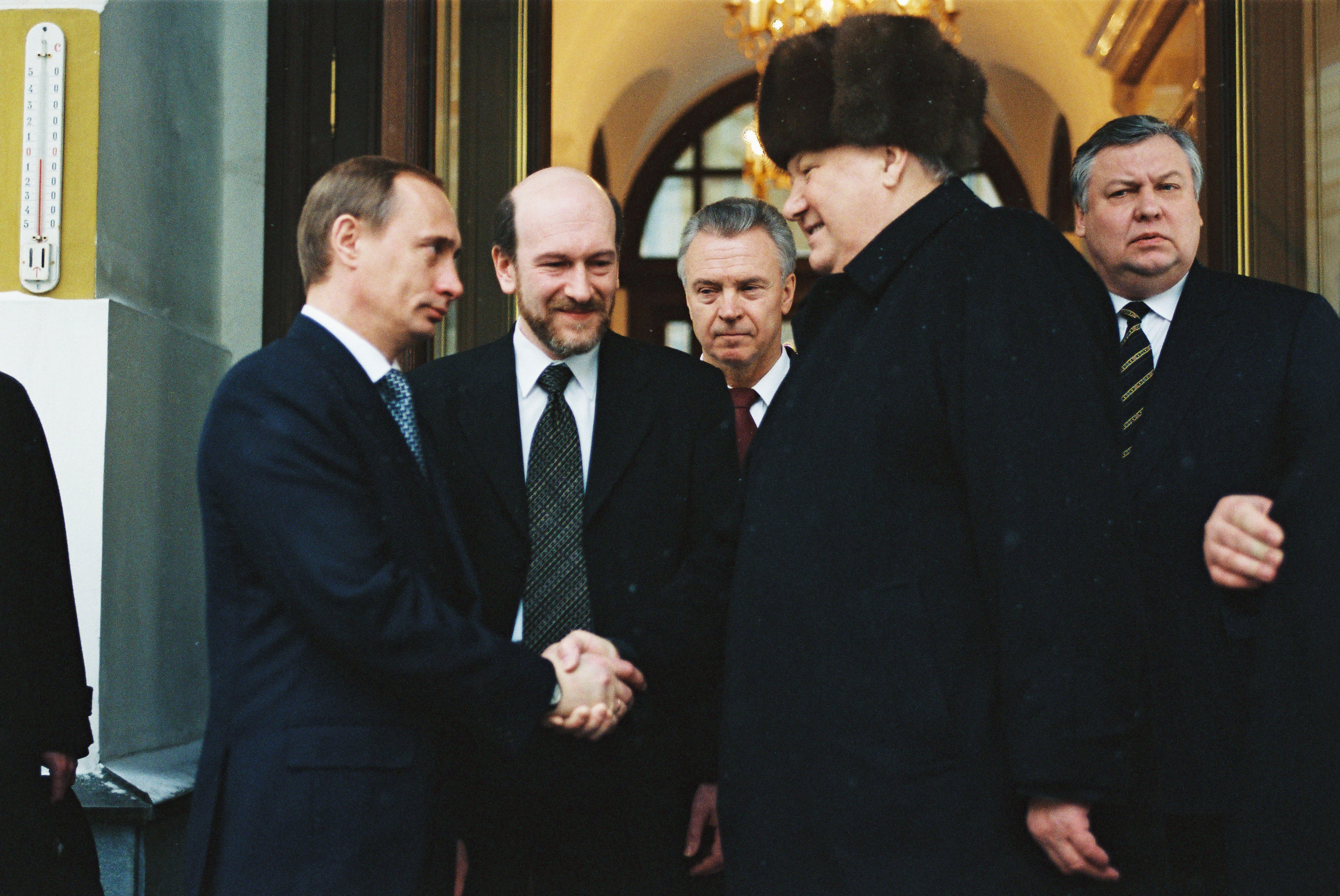
Boris Yeltsin resigning on December 31, 1999

According to the Russian constitution, the prime minister becomes the acting president when the incumbent steps down. On 31 December 1999, Yeltsin announced his resignation, and Vladimir Putin, who held the position of prime minister, automatically became the acting president.

Putin's first decree as acting president, as a loyal successor, was to grant Yeltsin immunity from future corruption charges.

At the end of 1999, a law was passed in Russia establishing strict conditions for registering candidates for the presidency, including collecting 1 million signatures and regulating financing, which gave an advantage to candidates supported by the government.

Yeltsin's resignation led to early presidential elections, for which possible competitors to Putin were not prepared. Presidential candidates Yuri Luzhkov and Yevgeny Primakov withdrew their candidacies. By the time of Yeltsin's resignation, Putin's popularity exceeded 50%. State media and administrative resources were under the control of the acting president, which significantly contributed to his victory.

== Impacts ==
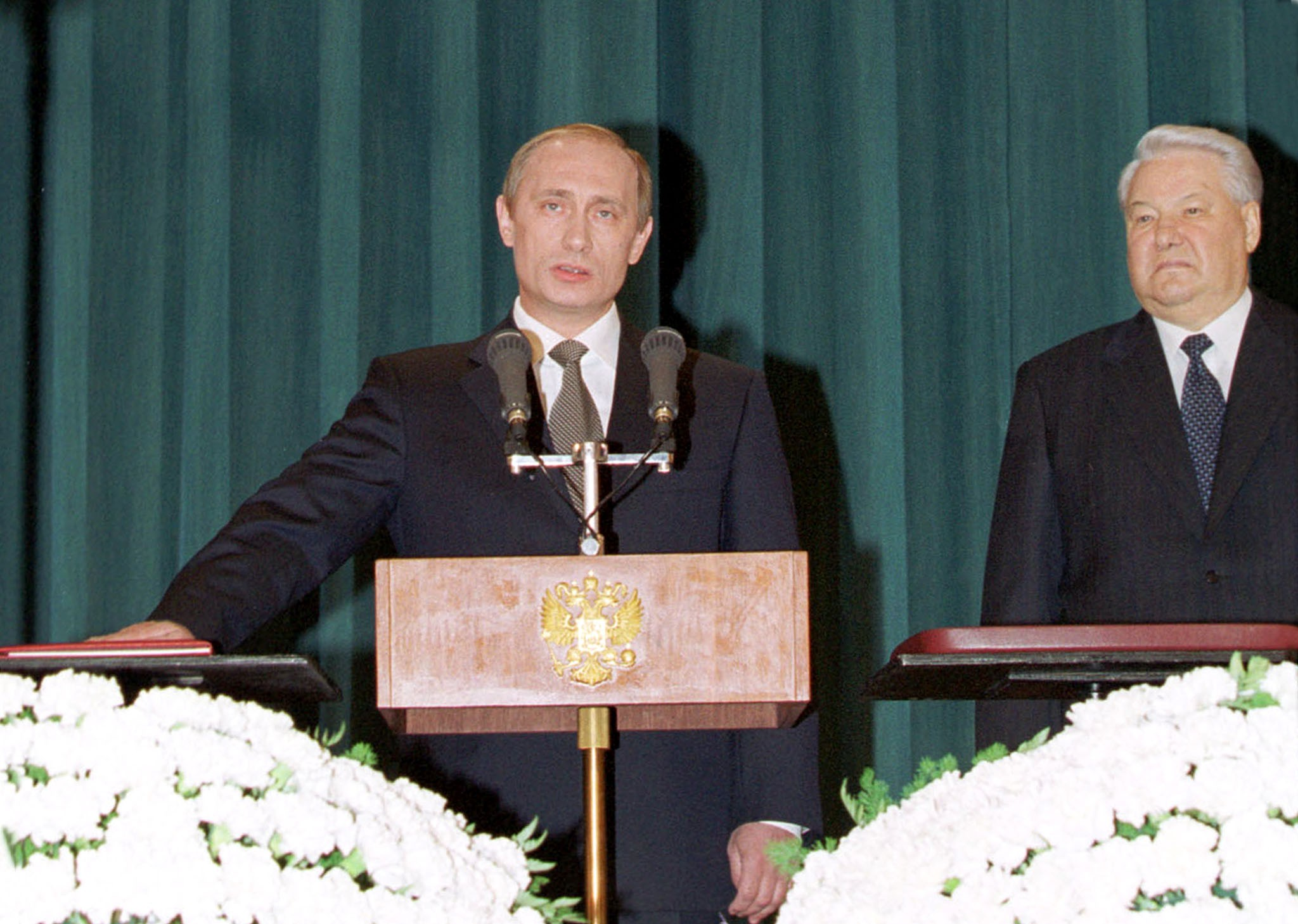
Vladimir Putin takes the oath of office as the president of Russia, Boris Yeltsin looks on.

The absence of a democratic process in the transfer of power from Yeltsin to Putin had a significant impact on Russia's political system and its further development. This period was characterized by the absence of a real democratic electoral procedure, which played a key role in shaping the country's political landscape and halted Russia's democratic development.

Supporters of liberal views did not have the opportunity to adequately prepare and participate in the elections, capitulating and supporting the chosen successor. Similarly, centrists could not organize an election campaign. Yeltsin's resignation and Putin's appointment as acting president were predetermined, making any democratic election mechanisms merely formal. As a result, representatives of liberal and centrist forces were sidelined in the political struggle and could not organize an effective election campaign.

Yeltsin's decision to change power without the involvement of broad public participation in choosing a successor was an important precedent in the country's political history. This laid the groundwork for further strengthening Vladimir Putin's position in the country and the subsequent establishment of an authoritarian regime in Russia. The absence of democratic processes in forming power opened the door to the establishment of a more centralized and authoritarian system of governance in Russia, weakening democratic institutions and limiting the opportunities for political opposition.

== See also ==
- Bibliography of Vladimir Putin
- Bibliography of Russian history (1991–present)
- Russia under Vladimir Putin
- Political career of Vladimir Putin
- Electoral history of Vladimir Putin
- Adolf Hitler's rise to power
- Joseph Stalin's rise to power
