= Andrei Dunayev =

Russian politician

- Андрей Дунаев

Minister of Internal Affairs
- In office 22 September 1993 – 3 October 1993^{[A]}^{[B]}
- President: Alexander Rutskoy
- Preceded by: Viktor Yerin
- Succeeded by: Viktor Yerin
- In office 13 September 1991 – 15 January 1992
- President: Boris Yeltsin
- Preceded by: Viktor Barannikov
- Succeeded by: Viktor Yerin

Personal details
- Born: 27 August 1939 (age 86) Alyoshkino, Ulyanovsk Oblast, Russian SFSR, Soviet Union
- Education: Academy of the USSR Ministry of Internal Affairs
- Awards: Jubilee Medal "In Commemoration of the 100th Anniversary of the Birth of Vladimir Ilyich Lenin"; Medal "For Excellent Service in the Protection of Public Order"; Jubilee Medal "50 Years of the Soviet Militia"; Medal "For Impeccable Service"; Medal "For Impeccable Service"

Military service
- Rank: Lieutenant general
- A. Acting. B. Disputed with Viktor Yerin. Appointed by the Supreme Soviet during the 1993 Russian constitutional crisis.

Andrei Fyodorovich Dunayev (Russian: Андрей Фёдорович Дунаев; born 27 August 1939) is a Soviet and Russian politician who served as Minister of Internal Affairs from 13 September 1991 to January 1992, and as acting minister of internal affairs of the Russian Federation, according to Vice President Alexander Rutskoy, from September to October 1993, during the 1993 Russian constitutional crisis. He was a People's Deputy of the RSFSR from March 1990 to October 1991. He was chairman of the board of directors of Globex Bank and a retired lieutenant general in the internal service.

== Biography ==
He was born in the village of Alyoshkino, Ulyanovsk Oblast. His father is Russian, and his mother is Mordvin, and speaks Erzya. Some sources list Dunayev's ethnicity as Mordvin. He graduated from the Alma-Ata Specialized Secondary Police School of the Soviet Ministry of Internal Affairs in 1959 and the Higher Police School of the Soviet Ministry of Internal Affairs. He worked as an operative from 1959 to 1965, then as a senior operative in the Internal Affairs Directorate of the Kostanay Regional Executive Committee (Kazakh SSR), then, from 1965, as Deputy Chief of the Internal Affairs Department of the Dzhetygara City Executive Committee of the Kostanay Region. From 1967, he became Chief of the Internal Affairs Department of the Terengulsky District Executive Committee of the Ulyanovsk Oblast. From 1973, he became Chief of the Criminal Investigation Department of the Ministry of Internal Affairs of the Chechen-Ingush ASSR.

In 1978, he was sent to study at the Academy of the USSR Ministry of Internal Affairs.

From 1979 to 1980, he was Deputy Minister of Internal Affairs of the Dagestan ASSR.

From 1980 to 1985, he was the Chief of the Internal Affairs Directorate of the Vologda Regional Executive Committee, and a major general of police.

From 1986 to 1990, he was the Chief of the Kaliningrad Specialized Secondary Police School of the USSR Ministry of Internal Affairs.

In 1990, he left the Communist Party of the Soviet Union.

In March 1990, he was elected as a People's Deputy of the RSFSR from Leningrad Territorial Electoral District No. 401 in Kaliningrad Oblast, and was a member of the Communists for Democracy faction.

From 26 October 1990, he was Deputy Minister of Internal Affairs of the RSFSR and Chief of the Personnel Service of the Ministry of Internal Affairs of the RSFSR.

On 19 August 1991, he brought cadets from police training institutions to Moscow to defend the White House from the State Emergency Committee. He led a combat group of the Ministry of Internal Affairs during the operation to return president Mikhail Gorbachev from Foros. He participated in the arrests of KGB Chairman Vladimir Kryuchkov and Soviet Defense Minister Dmitry Yazov.

From 13 September 1991 to 15 January 1992, he was Minister of Internal Affairs of the RSFSR. Following Dunayev's appointment as minister, the Supreme Soviet of the RSFSR, in accordance with Article 12 of the Law of the RSFSR on the Elections of People's Deputies of the RSFSR and Part 3 of Article 92 of the Constitution of the RSFSR, prematurely terminated his parliamentary powers. On 26 February 1993, the Constitutional Court of Russia upheld this decision.

From 13 September to 6 November 1991, he was a member of the State Council under the president of the RSFSR (as minister). At a meeting of the RSFSR government board, he advocated for the preservation of the USSR and proposed that Russian president Boris Yeltsin run for president of the USSR.

On 18 April 1992, he was appointed First Deputy Minister of Internal Affairs of Russia. He was dismissed from this post on July 22, 1993. The reason for his resignation as First Deputy Minister of Internal Affairs was the accusation of Dunayev and Security Minister Viktor Barannikov of abuse of office by the Interdepartmental Commission for Combating Corruption under the president of the Russian Federation.

On 22 September 1993, by decree of the acting president of Russia Alexander Rutskoy, approved by the Supreme Soviet, he was appointed Acting Minister of Internal Affairs. On October 3, he was appointed Minister for Special Assignments under the Acting President of the Russian Federation. Following the storming of the Supreme Soviet of Russia on 4 October, he was arrested and held in the Lefortovo pre-trial detention facility. He was released under an amnesty on 26 February 1994. Since his release, he has been retired and engaged in business.

Since 1994, he has been chairman of the board of directors of JSCB Novyi Russkiy Bank (Moscow). From 1996 to 2006, he was chairman of the board of directors of Globex Bank. He subsequently headed the companies JSC Ulyanovskkurort and Simbirskie Kurory, which own several sanatoriums and recreation centers. As of 2011, he is the chairman of the board of directors of JSC Ulyanovskkurort and, as of 2005, was its main shareholder.

He is married and has two sons, Vadim and Rostislav, five grandchildren, and two great-grandchildren.

During his police service in the Kazakh SSR, he became a Sambo champion.
