= Federal Security Agency of the Russian Soviet Federative Socialist Republic =

Defunct Russian security agency

Federal Security Agency of the RSFSR
- Агентство федеральной безопасности РСФСР

Agency overview
- Formed: November 26, 1991
- Dissolved: January 24, 1992
- Jurisdiction: President of RSFSR
- Headquarters: Moscow, Russia

The Federal Security Agency of the Russian Soviet Federative Socialist Republic (Russian: Агентство федеральной безопасности Российской Советской Федеративной Социалистической Республики) was an agency of the Government of the Russian Soviet Federative Socialist Republic, responsible for matters of ensuring state security in the RSFSR from November 1991 to January 1992.

== History ==
On May 5, 1991, the Presidium of the Supreme Soviet of the RSFSR adopted a resolution on the spit of the State Committee of the RSFSR for Defense and Security into the State Committee for Defense and the Committee for State Security (KGB) of the RSFSR (previously existed in 1955-1965).

On November 26, 1991, the president of the RSFSR Boris Yeltsin issued Decree No. 233 “On the transformation of the State Security Committee of the RSFSR into the Federal Security Agency of the RSFSR”. Less than a month later, on December 19, 1991, the Federal Security Agency was abolished, a decision which was soon challenged by the Supreme Soviet of Russia in the Constitutional Court of Russia and on January 14, 1992, it was found to be inconsistent with the Constitution of the RSFSR and, therefore, declared invalid. Accordingly, the AFB of Russia was restored.

On January 15, 1992, the director general of the agency, Viktor Ivanenko, was dismissed from his post, and Viktor Barannikov was appointed in his place. Nine days later, on January 24, 1992, the agency was abolished, and two deputy general directors: Yevgeny Savostyanov and Sergei Stepashin were immediately appointed deputy ministers of security.

== Structure ==
- Main Intelligence Directorate
- Main Directorate of Counterintelligence
- Main Information and Analytical Directorate
- Main Directorate for Work with Personnel
- Directorate of Military Counterintelligence
- Counter-Terrorism Directorate
- Foreign Intelligence Directorate
- Inspectorate Department
- Operational and Technical Management
- Communications Directorate
- Investigative Department
- Secretariat
- Military Medical Directorate
- Military Construction Directorate
- Service for interaction and coordination of activities with the security agencies of the Soviet Union
- Legal Support Service
- Economic management
- Economic Service
- Public Relations Center
- Internal Security Department
- Department of Operating Funds
- Pre-trial detention facility

== Directors ==
- Viktor Ivanenko (November 26, 1991 – January 15, 1992)
- Viktor Barannikov (January 15–24, 1992)
