= Orlin =

Orlin may refer to:

- Orlin (given name), a Bulgarian male given name
- Orlin (surname), a surname
- Orlin (Stargate), a character in the Stargate TV series
- Orlin, a mount near Gacko, Bosnia and Herzegovina
- Orlin Dywer, the identity of the supervillain Cicada in the television series The Flash

== See also ==
- Orlina, a settlement in Nikšić, Montenegro
