= Nikolai Golushko =

Ukrainian KGB officer (1937–2025)

- Николай Голушко

Director of the Federal Counterintelligence Service
- In office December 21, 1993 – February 28, 1994
- President: Boris Yeltsin
- Preceded by: Himself as Acting Minister of Security
- Succeeded by: Sergei Stepashin

Acting Minister of Security
- In office July 28 – December 21, 1993
- President: Boris Yeltsin
- Preceded by: Viktor Barannikov
- Succeeded by: Himself as FSK Head

Acting Director of the Security Service of Ukraine
- In office September 20 – November 6, 1991
- Preceded by: Himself as Ukrainian KGB Head
- Succeeded by: Yevhen Marchuk

Chairman of the KGB of the Ukrainian SSR
- In office May 21, 1987 – September 20, 1991
- Preceded by: Stepan Mukha
- Succeeded by: Office abolished

Personal details
- Born: Mykola Mykhailovych Golushko; 21 June 1937 Andreevka, Ruzaevsky district, North Kazakhstan Region, Kazakh SSR, Soviet Union
- Died: 21 October 2025 (aged 88) Moscow, Russia
- Party: Communist Party of the Soviet Union
- Children: 1 son

Military service
- Allegiance: Soviet Union (1959–1991); Ukraine (1991–1992); Russia (1992–1998)
- Branch/service: KGB (1959–1991); SBU (1991–1992); Ministry of Security; Federal Counterintelligence Service
- Years of service: 1959–1998
- Rank: Colonel general

Nikolai Mikhailovich Golushko (Note: Transliterated as Mykola Mykhaylovych Holushko from Ukrainian) (Russian: Николай Михайлович Голушко, Ukrainian: Микола Михайлович Голушко; 21 June 1937 – 10 August 2025) was a Ukrainian–Russian minister and KGB officer.

== Life and career ==
Golushko was born to a family of Grey Klyn Ukrainians. In 1959 he graduated from the law faculty of Tomsk University. He worked in the KGB from 1963 on (for many years as an officer in the Fifth department, that aimed at suppressing 'ideological diversions' and political dissent).

From 1987 to 1991 Golushko was the chairman of the Committee for State Security of the Ukrainian SSR (KDB). He was a member of the Communist Party of the Soviet Union from 1963 to 1991. Following August 1991 independence of Ukraine Golushko stayed on as chairman of the newly formed Security Service of Ukraine for four months before moving to Russia.

From 1992 first deputy of the minister of security of the Russian Federation. From July to December 1993 Golushko as acting minister of security of the Russian Federation. From December 1993 to February 1994 he was the director of the Director of the Federal Security Service. According to Yevgenia Albats, Golushko was forced to step down in 1994, after he had refused Yeltsin's request to bar State Duma from granting amnesty to the October 1993 rebels.

Golushko's military rank was Colonel General.

Golushko died in Moscow on 10 August 2025, at the age of 88.

== Bibliography ==
- Голушко Н. М. В спецслужбах трех государств. М., 2009.
- Голушко Николай Михайлович. История Современной России

Government offices
| Preceded by Stepan Mukha | Director of the Committee for State Security of the Ukrainian SSR/Acting Director of the Security Service of Ukraine; 1987–1991 | Succeeded by Yevhen Marchuk |
| Preceded by Viktor Barannikov | Minister of Security (Acting)/Director of the Federal Counterintelligence Service; 1993–1994 | Succeeded by Sergei Stepashin |
