= Valentin Kovalyov =

Russian politician

- Валентин Ковалёв
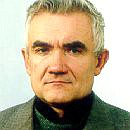
- Kovalyov in 1993

Minister of Justice
- In office January 5, 1995 – July 2, 1997; Acting
- President: Boris Yeltsin
- Preceded by: Yury Kalmykov
- Succeeded by: Sergei Stepashin

Personal details
- Born: 10 January 1944 (age 82) Dnepropetrovsk, Ukrainian SSR, USSR
- Party: Communist Party
- Education: Lomonosov Moscow State University

Valentin Alekseyevich Kovalyov (Russian: Валенти́н Алексе́евич Ковалёв; born January 10, 1944) is a Russian statesman, Minister of Justice of the Russian Federation (1995-1997).

== Career ==
Graduated from the Law Faculty of Moscow State University, Higher School of Public Administration of Harvard University. Doctor of Law, Professor.

In December 1993, he was elected to the State Duma of the first convocation on the list of the Communist Party of the Russian Federation, from January 1994 to January 1995 he was one of the four Vice-Chairmen of the State Duma, and from December 1994 he headed the State Duma headquarters on the situation with the armed conflict in the Chechen Republic. He was a member of the Observatory on the organization of the negotiation process with the Chechen Republic and the chairman of the United Trilateral Human Rights Commission in Chechnya.

On January 5, 1995, he was appointed Minister of Justice of the Russian Federation. One of the first members of the Government who visited (freed January 29, 1995) the liberated Grozny and the Presidential Palace of Dudayev.

In February 1999, he was arrested on charges of misappropriating funds from a public foundation under the Russian Ministry of Justice when he was minister, as well as illegal possession of weapons and ammunition. In August 2000, the Prosecutor General’s Office of the Russian Federation approved the bill of indictment and sent the court a criminal case on charges of accepting bribes and taking money from Kovalyov.

On October 3, 2001, by the decision of the Moscow Court, he was sentenced to 9 years of imprisonment with a probation period of 5 years. Kovalyov was found guilty of embezzling entrusted property and repeatedly receiving bribes on a large scale. Also, in accordance with the verdict of the court, Valentin Kovalyov was deprived of the rank of State Adviser of Justice of the Russian Federation previously assigned to him and the honorary title Honoured Lawyer of Russia.

He authored the book Version of the Minister of Justice, published in 2002.
