= Sergei Stepashin =

Prime Minister of Russia in 1999

- Сергей Степашин
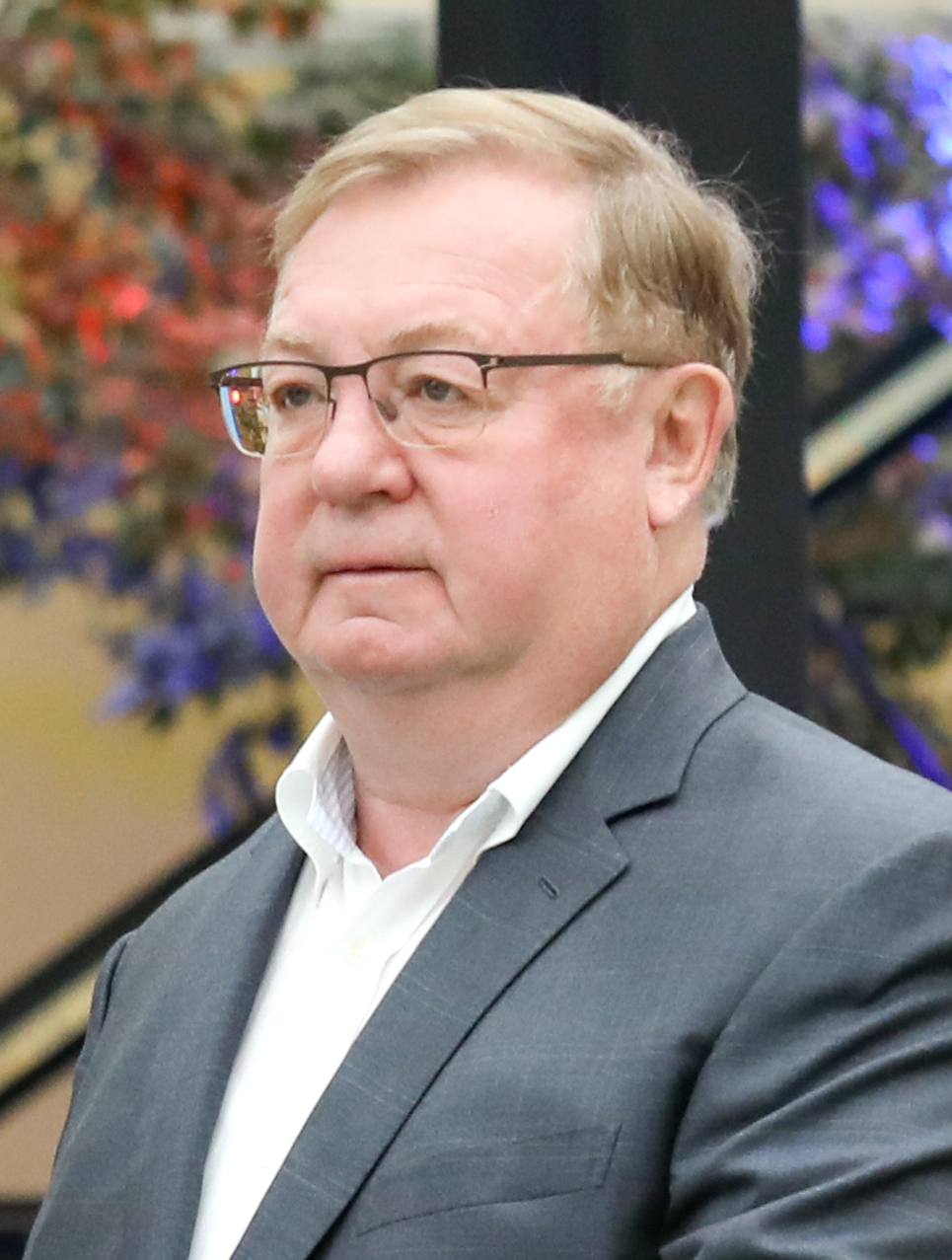
- Stepashin in 2021

Chairman of the Accounts Chamber
- In office 19 April 2000 – 20 September 2013
- President: Vladimir Putin; Dmitry Medvedev
- Preceded by: Khachim Karmokov
- Succeeded by: Tatyana Golikova

Member of the State Duma
- In office 18 January – 26 April 2000

Prime Minister of Russia
- In office 12 May 1999 – 9 August 1999; Acting: 12–19 May 1999
- President: Boris Yeltsin
- Deputy: See list: Himself; Nikolay Aksyonenko; Mikhail Zadornov; Viktor Khristenko
- Preceded by: Yevgeny Primakov
- Succeeded by: Vladimir Putin
Other offices
First Deputy Prime Minister of Russia
In office 27 April 1999 – 19 May 1999
Prime Minister	Yevgeny Primakov
Preceded by	Vadim Gustov
Succeeded by	Nikolai Aksyonenko
Minister of Internal Affairs
In office 30 March 1998 – 12 May 1999; Acting: 30 March – 24 April 1998
Prime Minister	Sergey Kiriyenko; Yevgeny Primakov
Preceded by	Anatoly Kulikov
Succeeded by	Vladimir Rushaylo
Minister of Justice
In office 2 July 1997 – 30 March 1998
Prime Minister	Viktor Chernomyrdin
Preceded by	Valentin Kovalev
Succeeded by	Pavel Krasheninnikov
Director of the Federal Security Service
In office 12 April 1995 – 30 June 1995
President	Boris Yeltsin
Preceded by	Himself
Succeeded by	Anatoly Safonov
Director of the Federal Counterintelligence Service
In office 3 March 1994 – 12 April 1995
Preceded by	Nikolai Golushko
Succeeded by	Office abolished

Personal details
- Born: Sergei Vadimovich Stepashin; 2 March 1952 (age 74) Port-Arthur, Kvantun Oblast, Russian SFSR, USSR (now Lüshunkou, China)
- Spouse: Tamara Stepashina
- Children: Vladimir
- Education: Lenin Political-Military Academy, Finance Academy
- Awards: Order of Courage

Military service
- Allegiance: Soviet Union (to 1991); Russia
- Branch/service: Internal Troops; Federal Counterintelligence Service; Federal Security Service
- Years of service: 1970–1999
- Rank: Colonel General
- Battles/wars: 1991 Soviet coup attempt 1993 Russian constitutional crisis
- Sergei Stepashin's voice Stepashin's interview with Echo Moscow; Recorded 16 March 2015

Sergei Vadimovich Stepashin (Note: In this name that follows East Slavic naming customs, the patronymic is Vadimovich and the family name is Stepashin.) (Russian: Сергей Вадимович Степашин; born 2 March 1952) is a Russian politician who briefly served as Prime Minister of Russia in 1999. Subsequent to his tenure as prime minister, he was elected to the State Duma, but resigned to serve as chairman of the Accounts Chamber of Russia, from 2000 to 2013.

Stepashin served in the Soviet Internal Troops and graduated from the Lenin Military-Political Academy. Prior to his premiership, Stepashin became a member of the Russian Congress of People's Deputies in the 1990 election. He defected from the parliament during the 1993 Russian constitutional crisis and was appointed director of the Federal Security Service by President Boris Yeltsin in 1994. Stepashin resigned in 1995 as a consequence of the Budyonnovsk hospital hostage crisis. He later served as Minister of Justice from 1997 to 1998 and Minister of Internal Affairs from 1998 to 1999. During his brief tenure as prime minister, he succeeded in negotiating an IMF loan for Russia and a restructuring of its debt. He also represented Russia at the G8 summit in 1999.

== Early life, education, and military service ==
Stepashin was born in Port-Arthur, Kvantun Oblast, USSR (now Lüshunkou, China) on 2 March 1952. He graduated from the Higher Political School of the USSR Ministry of the Interior (1973), then he served in the internal troops from 1973 until 1981. He graduated in 1981 from the Lenin Military-Political Academy and in 2002 from the Finance Academy. He is a Doctor of Law, Professor, and has a rank of the State Advisor on Justice of the Russian Federation. His military rank is colonel general. He wrote a thesis on the ideological preparedness of firefighters.

== Political career ==
=== Yeltsin administration ===
Stepashin was a member of the Russian Congress of People's Deputies that was elected in 1990 and became the head of its defense and security committee. During the 1993 Russian constitutional crisis, he resigned from his position when President Boris Yeltsin ordered the dissolution of the Congress, and was appointed deputy security minister. Stepashin accused the chairman of the Congress, Ruslan Khasbulatov, of provoking Yeltsin into taking action against the parliament by frequently blocking his agenda. In December 1993 Yeltsin ordered a reformation of the ministry of security that replaced the KGB, and Stepashin said in January 1994 that half of its employees will be let go.

Stepashin was appointed the head of the Federal Counterintelligence Service, the FSK (the predecessor of the Federal Security Service, the FSB) on 3 March 1994. He said that the agency need be brought under closer legislative control, and he replaced a career KGB officer in the role, Nikolai Golushko. The appointment came after Yeltsin expressed frustration that attempts to reform the former KGB had been largely symbolic. On 25 March 1994 he said that an overhaul of the FSK's personnel had been completed, and that it had 75,000 members, less than half of the security ministry that it replaced. In November 1994 Stepashin encouraged the State Duma to pass a bill restoring powers to the FSB that had been taken away during democratic reforms in 1993, in order to better fight organized crime. He was also one of the hawks behind Yeltsin's decision to wage the war in Chechnya in December 1994.

Stepashin resigned as the director of the renamed FSB on 30 June 1995 along with several other officials, after earlier that month over 100 people were killed in a Chechen raid and hostage crisis in Budyonnovsk, Stavropol Krai. In November 1995 he was appointed to another position in the government. On 2 July 1997, he was appointed by Yeltsin as the Minister of Justice to replace Valentin Kovalyov. In March 1998, he was made the acting Minister of Internal Affairs to replace Anatoly Kulikov, and was approved in that office on 24 April 1998 by the State Duma. Stepashin was initially in Viktor Chernomyrdin's and Sergey Kiriyenko's cabinet, and remained in Yevgeny Primakov's cabinet in September 1998. On 26 April 1999 Stepashin closed the border with Russia's Chechnya region and deployed Interior Ministry troops after raids by Chechen rebels into neighboring territories. The next day, he was named First Deputy Prime Minister of Russia to replace Vadim Gustov.

=== Prime Minister (1999) ===
On 12 May 1999, Yeltsin removed Primakov and named Stepashin as acting Prime Minister of Russia. Yeltsin said that the economy was the reason for the change, and Stepashin pledged to continue economic reforms. In the days following the appointment, he consulted with his predecessor on the Kosovo crisis. He was confirmed as prime minister by the Duma on 19 May. There was a disagreement between him and Yeltsin while forming his cabinet. Stepashin was unable to get Yeltsin and first deputy premier Nikolai Aksyonenko to accept his choice of Alexander Zhukov in a post responsible for economic issues. The compromise candidate they agreed on, Mikhail Zadornov, resigned after three days in the post, leading to more negotiations.

Stepashin and FSB director Vladimir Putin met Chinese Central Military Commission deputy head Zhang Wannian on 9 June. Stepashin said that strengthening the strategic partnership between Russia and China was a priority for presidents Yeltsin and Jiang Zemin. He also said the presidents agreed that the NATO bombing of Yugoslavia had to stop. Stepashin met U.S. Deputy Secretary of State Strobe Talbott on 10 June, where they spoke about the possible Russian participation in the Kosovo peacekeeping force. Stepashin was not informed ahead of time by Yeltsin of Russian troops deploying and seizing Pristina Airport in Kosovo, which occurred a few days later. He also urged the State Duma to pass a package of austerity bills that were necessary for Russia to receive assistance from the IMF. Stepashin attended the G8 summit in Germany and spoke with the other leaders, including U.S. president Bill Clinton. On 18 June they spoke about Kosovo, and on 19 June about the Russian economy and the IMF assistance.

Stepashin succeeded in securing the IMF loan for Russia and a restructuring of its Soviet-era debt. On 5 July Stepashin met Syrian president Hafez al-Assad during his first visit to Moscow since the dissolution of the Soviet Union. On 13 July he reached an agreement with U.S. vice president Al Gore in Paris on exporting Russian steel to the United States. Stepashin had a joint press conference with Gore in Washington on 27 July, in what was seen as a continuation of the Gore–Chernomyrdin Commission meetings.

Stepashin's attitude towards the Chechen conflict was markedly different from that of Vladimir Putin. Stepashin had, for example, presented leaders of the separatist regime in Chechnya with monogrammed pistols, praised the activities of the religious extremists who had taken over several Dagestani villages, and had proclaimed publicly: "We can afford to lose Dagestan!". Yeltsin removed Stepashin as prime minister on 9 August. He was the fourth prime minister dismissed by Yeltsin in eighteen months. In the same statement, Yeltsin announced the appointment of Putin as acting prime minister and also endorsed him for the presidential election in 2000. Stepashin said shortly after his dismissal that he lost the post because he refused to serve a certain interest group, referring to "the Family" of oligarchs around Yeltsin.

=== Later career ===
After having been fired from the position of prime minister, Stepashin joined the political party Yabloko for the Russian parliamentary elections of 1999 and was elected to the State Duma, the lower house of the Russian parliament. Later on he resigned his parliamentary seat and became head of the Account Chamber of the Russian Federation, the federal audit agency. He held this job until 2013.

Since 2007, Stepashin is the head of the revived Imperial Orthodox Palestine Society.

On 27 March 2024, Stepashin met with the Vietnamese Ambassador to Russia Dang Minh Khoi (Vietnamese: Đặng Minh Khôi) who is an expert on China and Northeast Asia Department affairs for the government of Vietnam.

== Honours and awards ==
- Order of Merit for the Fatherland;
  - 2nd class (2 March 2007) - for outstanding contribution to the strengthening and development of state financial control, and many years of honest work
  - 3rd class (2 March 2002) - for great contribution to strengthening Russian statehood and many years of conscientious service
  - 4th class (28 February 2012)
- Order of Courage (28 December 1998) - for his great personal contribution to strengthening the rule of law and order, displaying courage and dedication
- Medal "For Distinguished Service to the Public Order"
- Medal "For Distinction in Military Service", 1st and 2nd classes
- Commander of the Legion of Honour (France)
- Commander 1st Class of the Order of the Polar Star (Sweden)
- Order of Diplomatic Service Merit, 1st class (Republic of Korea, 2004)
- Order of St. Seraphim of Sarov (Russian Orthodox Church);
  - 1st class (2009) - in consideration of his work for the restoration of Volsk cathedral
  - 2nd class (2006) - for his contribution to the restoration of Holy Transfiguration Monastery in Murom
- Order of the Commonwealth (CIS Interparliamentary Assembly)
- Diploma of the Government of the Russian Federation (2 October 2006) - for his great personal contribution to the development and strengthening of public financial control, more efficient use of the federal budget
- Honour of the State Duma of the Russian Federation "For merits in development of parliamentarism" (2006)
- Honorary Citizen of Murom (2006)
- Order of Saint Nicholas the Wonderworker, 1st class (Russian Imperial House)
- Honorary Doctor of the Diplomatic Academy of Russia (25 October 2011)

== Notes ==
Government offices
Preceded by Nikolay Golushko	Director of the Federal Security Service; 1994–1995	Succeeded by Mikhail Barsukov
Preceded by Khachim Karmokov	Chairman of the Accounts Chamber of Russia; 2000–2013	Succeeded by Tatyana Golikova
Political offices
Preceded by Valentin Kovalev	Minister of Justice; 1997–1998	Succeeded by Pavel Krasheninnikov
Preceded by Anatoly Kulikov	Minister of Internal Affairs; 1998–1999	Succeeded by Vladimir Rushailo
Preceded by Yevgeniy Primakov	Prime Minister of Russia; 1999	Succeeded by Vladimir Putin
