= Anatoly Kulikov =

Russian general (born 1946)

- Анатолий Куликов
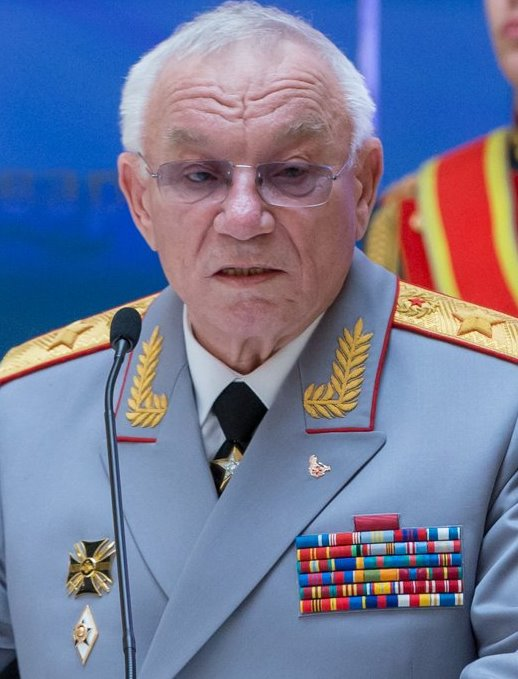
- Kulikov in 2018

Minister of Internal Affairs
- In office 6 July 1995 – 23 March 1998
- President: Boris Yeltsin
- Prime Minister: Viktor Chernomyrdin
- Preceded by: Viktor Yerin
- Succeeded by: Sergei Stepashin

Personal details
- Born: September 4, 1946 (age 80) Aigursky, Stavropol Krai, RSFSR, USSR

Military service
- Allegiance: Soviet Union; Russia
- Branch/service: Soviet Internal Troops; Russian Internal troops
- Years of service: 1966–1998
- Rank: Army General (Russia)
- Battles/wars: 1993 Constitutional Crisis; First Chechen War
- Anatoly Kulikov's voice Kulikov on the Echo of Moscow program, 14 October 2013

Anatoly Sergeyevich Kulikov (Russian: Анатолий Серге́евич Кулико́в; born 4 September 1946) is a Russian General of the Army and former Interior Minister of Russia (1995–1998).

In 1992 Kulikov became Commander of the Interior Troops. Consequently he was one of the commanders of pro-government forces during the 1993 Constitutional Crisis in Moscow and the First Chechen War. In early 1995 Kulikov was appointed commander of the Joint Group of Federal Forces in Chechnya and he commanded the Russian forces during the infamous Samashki massacre.

On July 6, 1995, after the Budyonnovsk hostage crisis, he succeeded Viktor Yerin as Interior Minister of Russia. In August 1996 Alexander Lebed, who had just been appointed Secretary of the Security Council of Russia, blamed Kulikov for the disastrous Battle of Grozny and requested that President Boris Yeltsin fire Kulikov. However, Yeltsin declined his request and in October fired Lebed from his position.

In 1997, Kulikov linked both the Cherney brothers and Reuben brothers to the Izmaylovskaya mafia which was led by Anton Malevsky in Israel, but, in March 1998, Boris Yeltsin removed Kulikov from his post along with the entire second cabinet of Viktor Chernomyrdin.

While most of the ministers of the old cabinet were reappointed to Sergei Kiriyenko's Cabinet, Kulikov was not and Sergei Stepashin became the next interior minister. Afterwards, Kulikov was elected to the State Duma twice, in the 1999 election and 2003 election, and was a member of the pro-government United Russia faction.

== Honours and awards ==
- Order of Merit for the Fatherland, 3rd class (3 September 1996) - for services to the state, his great personal contribution to strengthening the rule of law and many years of honest service in the internal affairs
- Order of Honour (16 April 2004) - for active participation in legislative activities and many years of honest work
- Order for Personal Courage
- Jubilee Medal "In Commemoration of the 100th Anniversary since the Birth of Vladimir Il'ich Lenin"
- Order for Service to the Homeland in the Armed Forces of the USSR 3rd class
- Medal "For Distinction in the Protection of Public Order"
- Jubilee Medal "Twenty Years of Victory in the Great Patriotic War 1941-1945"
- Jubilee Medal "Thirty Years of Victory in the Great Patriotic War 1941-1945"
- Jubilee Medal "300 Years of the Russian Navy"
- Medal "In Commemoration of the 850th Anniversary of Moscow"
- Medal "Veteran of the Armed Forces of the USSR"
- Jubilee Medal "50 Years of the Armed Forces of the USSR"
- Jubilee Medal "60 Years of the Armed Forces of the USSR"
- Jubilee Medal "70 Years of the Armed Forces of the USSR"
- Medal "For Impeccable Service" 1st, 2nd and 3rd classes
- Medal "Anatoly Koni" (Min Justice)
- Medal "For Services to the Stavropol Territory" (Stavropol Territory, September 2006)

Political offices
Preceded by Viktor Yerin	Interior Minister of Russia; 1995 — 1998	Succeeded by Sergei Stepashin
