= Orlin (surname) =

Orlin, feminine: Orlina is an artificial Russian surname originated in clergy, derived from the bird oryol, 'eagle'. Boris Unbegaun writes that the church origin is recognized by a nonstandard usage of the possessive suffix '-in': when deriving from a masculine noun, the suffix is supposed to be '-ov', as in "Orlov". Notable people with the surname include:

- Ambrosiy Yakovlev-Orlin (1752–1809), bishop of the Russian Orthodox Church, Archbishop of Ryazan and Zaraisk
- James B. Orlin, American operations researcher
- James Orlin Grabbe, American economist and writer
- Robyn Orlin, South African dancer and choreographer
- Sergey Orlin (1902–1988), Soviet scientist and engineer

== See also ==
- Distinguish from Orlin (given name), Bulgarian male name
