= Viktor Yerin =

Russian politician (1944–2018)

- Виктор Ерин
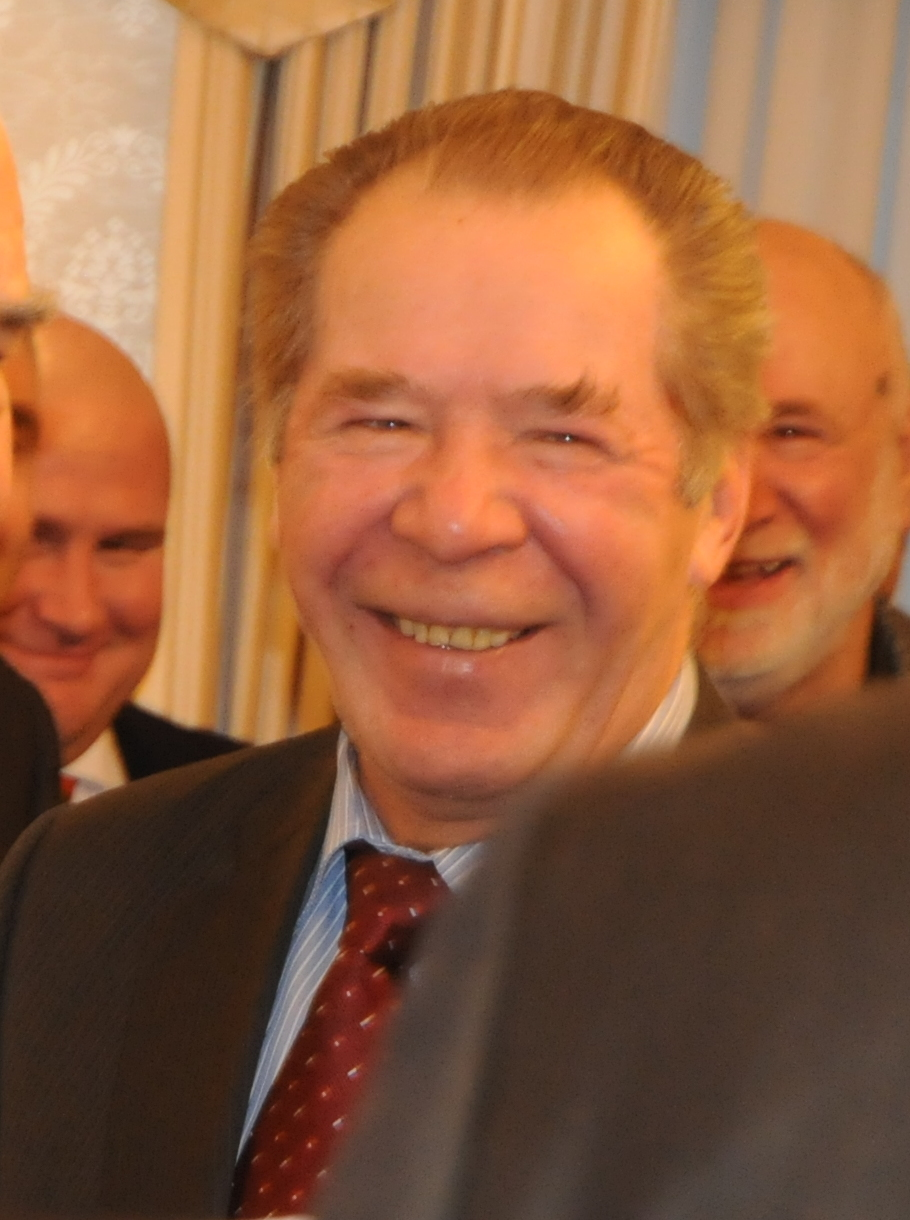
- Yerin in 2016

Minister of Internal Affairs
- In office 15 January 1992 – 30 June 1995
- President: Boris Yeltsin
- Preceded by: Andrey Dunayev
- Succeeded by: Anatoly Kulikov

Personal details
- Born: January 17, 1944 Kazan, Russian SFSR, Soviet Union
- Died: March 19, 2018 (aged 74) Moscow, Russia
- Children: Leonid Yerin
- Education: Higher School of the MVD

Military service
- Allegiance: Soviet Union; Russia
- Branch/service: Ministry of Internal Affairs
- Years of service: 1964—2000
- Rank: General of the Army

Viktor Fyodorovich Yerin (Russian: Виктор Фёдорович Ерин; 17 January 1944 – 19 March 2018) was a Russian politician and General of the Army who served as the country's first post-Soviet Minister of Internal Affairs (1992—1995). Hero of the Russian Federation (1993).

== Biography ==
Viktor Yerin began his career in Soviet security forces (police). Working in Tatarstan police, he participated in investigating especially dangerous criminal bands. Since 1991 Yerin served as the first deputy minister of interior of the RSFSR. In January 1992, he became Russia's interior minister. In November 1992, he led an operative staff for re-establishing constitutional order in the Ossetian-Ingush conflict region. From December 1994 to January 1995 he was in charge of the activities of the Internal Troops of Russia in Chechnya. On 30 June 1995, after the failed operation to free hostages taken by Chechen terrorists in Budyonnovsk, Yerin had to resign (as did the then-FSB director Stepashin). On 5 July 1995, Yerin was assigned the position of deputy director of Russia's Foreign Intelligence Service.

In 1993, Viktor Yerin was awarded the title Hero of the Russian Federation for his part in quelling the anti-Yeltsin rebellion in October 1993.

== Awards ==
- Order of the Red Star
- Jubilee Medal "In Commemoration of the 100th Anniversary since the Birth of Vladimir Il'ich Lenin"
- Medal "For Labour Valour"
- Medal "Veteran of Labour"
- Medal Defender of a Free Russia

== See also ==
- List of Heroes of the Russian Federation
