= Constitution of Russia (disambiguation) =

The Constitution of Russia was enacted in 1993.

Russian constitution and Constitution of Russia may also refer to:

- Russian Constitution of 1906
- Soviet Russia Constitution of 1918
- 1925 Russian Constitution adopted because of the 1924 Soviet Constitution
- 1937 Russian Constitution adopted because of the 1936 Soviet Constitution
- Russian Constitution of 1978 adopted because of the 1977 Soviet Constitution

== See also ==
- Constitution of the Soviet Union
