= KGB of the RSFSR =

The Committee for State Security of the RSFSR (Russian: Комитет государственной безопасности РСФСР, romanised: Komitet gosudarstvennoy bezopasnosti RSFSR), abbreviated as KGB of the RSFSR was a state committee of the Government of the Russian Soviet Federative Socialist Republic and a republican part of All-Union Committee for State Security. It was responsible for ensuring state security of the RSFSR (now the Russian Federation) and operated from March 26, 1955, to December 17, 1965, and from May 5 to November 26, 1991. It was transformed into the Federal Security Agency of the RSFSR on November 26, 1991.

== History ==
From 1923 to 1941, and from 1965 to 1991, the RSFSR, unlike other republics of the USSR, did not have its own republican security agencies. All local KGB departments on Russian territory were directly managed by KGB headquarters. On March 26, 1955, the Committee for State Security existed under the Council of Ministers of the RSFSR. It was disestablished on December 17, 1965. It was re-established by the decision of the Presidium of the Supreme Soviet of the RSFSR on May 5, 1991, by dividing the State Committee for Defense and Security. A day later, the Chairman of the Supreme Soviet of the RSFSR Boris Yeltsin and the Chairman of the KGB Vladimir Kryuchkov, signed a protocol approving the re-establishment, giving it the status of an "union-republican state committee". The staff of the re-established service consisted of only 14 people and was housed in the White House.

As the union committee was being dismantled as a result of the August coup, certain units of the Union KGB were transferred to the Russian branch. On November 26, 1991, President Yeltsin signed a decree according to which the KGB of the RSFSR was transformed into the Federal Security Agency.
