= Andrey Rostenko =

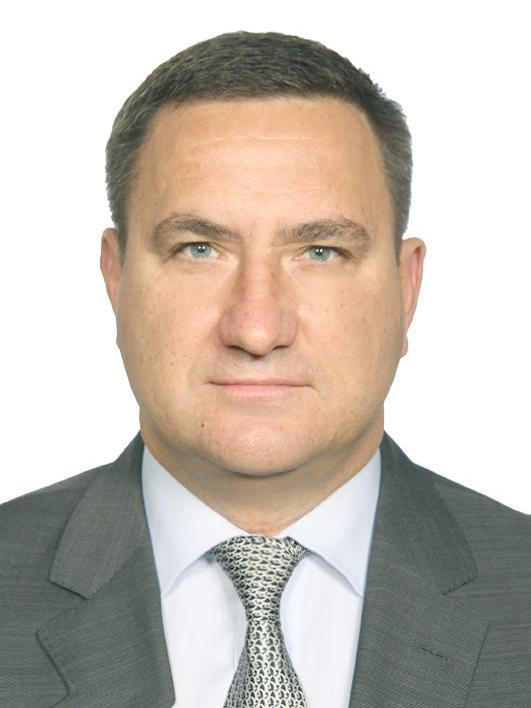
Rostenko in 2020.

Andrey Olegovich Rostenko (Russian: Андрей Олегович Ростенко; born 6 April 1969 in Tashkent, Uzbekistan) is a Russian and former Ukrainian politician who served as the de facto Mayor of Yalta, Crimea, from 2014 to 2017 following the Russian annexation of Crimea. He is also the former Head of the Yalta Municipal Administration of the Republic of Crimea of the Yalta International Forum Foundation.

== Early life ==
Rostenko was born on 6 April 1969 in Tashkent, which was then part of the Uzbek SSR in the Soviet Union. In 1990, he graduated from the Simferopol Higher Military‑Political Construction School with a qualification for the military and as a teacher of history and social studies. He then completed his serve in the Soviet Armed Forces. Following this, he worked for nine years as a driver and forwarder at the private small enterprise "Sirius", before becoming general director and commercial director of the LLC "Firma 'Termodom'" from 2000 to 2014. During this time, he graduated from V. I. Vernadsky Taurida National University with a specialty in international economics. He also later graduated from the same university in 2016 with a master's degree in state and municipal administration, and in 2020 from the Russian Presidential Academy of National Economy and Public Administration with an additional master's degree in state and municipal administration.

== Political career ==
In 2010 he was elected a deputy of the Simferopol City Council. Rostenko supported the Russian annexation of Crimea, and following the annexation became First Deputy City Head of the Yalta City Council until September 2014. He was then promoted to Acting Head of the Administration of Yalta until November 2014. In November, he officially became Head of the Admiinistration of Yalta, beating the other candidate to the position, Konstantin Shimanovsky, with 79 votes to 58. He was dismissed from the position in July 2017 for alleged ineffective management of the administration of Yalta.

He then served as, from August 2017 to October 2019, as Assistant to the Chairman of the Council of Ministers before becoming Assistant to the Head of the Republic of Crimea until August 2020. Since October 2021 he has been Deputy Minister of Culture of the Republic of Crimea and Head of the Department of State Protection of Cultural Heritage.

== Legal issues ==
In 2018, he was detained in Moscow on suspicion of abuse of office related to a land plot in Yalta, which Sergey Aksyonov called "baseless" saying the case materials contain no corpus delicti and was driven by attempts to "discredit the Crimean leadership". This stemmed from several criminal cases that began in mid-2017 about unjustified changes to the designated use of land plots, impproper registration of property rights, and questionable lease agreements that had made the city of Yalta lose more than 2.3 billion rubles during his tenure. The case was further ignited upon the revelation of a housing scandal, where it was found he moved into a luxury villa, despite the fact that his salary was relatively modest and he left unpaid utility debts. The case ended quietly when the land was returned to the Republic of Crimea, and Rostenko was released under travel restrictions.

He has been included on the list of people that are called "enemies of Ukraine" by Myrotvorets for his support of the annexation.
