= Electoral history of Vladimir Putin =

Elections featuring President of Russia

Electoral history of Vladimir Putin, second and fourth President of Russia and 33rd Prime Minister of Russia.

The legitimacy of 21st century elections in Russia, with their consistent high turn-out for one candidate, have been questioned by academics and observers, although such accusations of fraud and vote-rigging have been consistently denied by Russian officials.

== Presidential elections ==
=== 2000 ===
2000 election. Blue indicates a win by Putin, red a win by Zyuganov, grey a win by Tuleyev.

2000 presidential election
Candidate	Party	Votes	%
Vladimir Putin	Independent	39,740,467	53.4
Gennady Zyuganov	Communist Party	21,928,468	29.5
Grigory Yavlinsky	Yabloko	4,351,450	5.9
Aman Tuleyev	Independent	2,217,364	3.0
Vladimir Zhirinovsky	Liberal Democratic Party	2,026,509	2.7
Konstantin Titov	Independent	1,107,269	1.5
Ella Pamfilova	For Civic Dignity	758,967	1.0
Stanislav Govorukhin	Independent	328,723	0.4
Yury Skuratov	Independent	319,189	0.4
Alexey Podberezkin	Spiritual Heritage	98,177	0.1
Umar Dzhabrailov	Independent	78,498	0.1
Against all		1,414,673	1.9
Source: Nohlen & Stöver,

=== 2004 ===
2004 election. Grey indicates a win by Putin, red a win by Kharitonov.

2004 presidential election
Candidate	Party	Votes	%
Vladimir Putin	Independent	49,558,328	71.9
Nikolay Kharitonov	Communist Party	9,514,554	13.8
Sergey Glazyev	Independent	2,850,610	4.1
Irina Khakamada	Independent	2,672,189	3.9
Oleg Malyshkin	Liberal Democratic Party	1,405,326	2.0
Sergey Mironov	Russian Party of Life	524,332	0.8
Against all		2,397,140	3.5
Source: Nohlen & Stöver

=== 2012 ===
2012 election. Blue indicates a win by Putin.

==== United Russia nomination ====
For		Against	
614	100.0%	0	0.0%

==== General election ====
2012 presidential election
Candidates	Party	Votes	%
Vladimir Putin	United Russia	45,602,075	63.60
Gennady Zyuganov	Communist Party	12,318,353	17.18
Mikhail Prokhorov	Independent	5,722,508	7.98
Vladimir Zhirinovsky	Liberal Democratic Party	4,458,103	6.22
Sergey Mironov	A Just Russia	2,763,935	3.85

=== 2018 ===
2018 election. Gray indicates a win by Putin.

2018 presidential election
Candidates	Party	Votes	%
Vladimir Putin	Independent	56,430,712	76.69
Pavel Grudinin	Communist Party	8,659,206	11.77
Vladimir Zhirinovsky	Liberal Democratic Party	4,154,985	5.65
Ksenia Sobchak	Civic Initiative	1,238,031	1.68
Grigory Yavlinsky	Yabloko	769,644	1.05
Boris Titov	Party of Growth	556,801	0.76
Maxim Suraykin	Communists of Russia	499,342	0.68
Sergey Baburin	Russian All-People's Union	479,013	0.65
Source: CEC

=== 2024 ===
2024 election. Gray indicates a win by Putin.

The Russian Constitution was amended in 2020 to reset the count of served presidential terms. This allowed Putin to run for office again in 2024, despite a limit of two terms.

2024 presidential election
Candidates	Party	Votes	%
Vladimir Putin	Independent	76,277,708	88.48
Nikolay Kharitonov	Communist Party	3,768,470	4.37
Vladislav Davankov	New People	3,362,484	3.90
Leonid Slutsky	Liberal Democratic Party	2,795,629	3.24
Source: CEC

== Prime Minister nominations ==
=== 1999 ===
For		Against		Abstaining		No voting	
233	51.8%	84	18.7%	17	3.8%	105	23.3%

=== 2008 ===
For		Against		Abstaining		No voting	
392	87.1%	56	12.4%	0	0.0%	2	0.4%
