= Order of the Commonwealth =

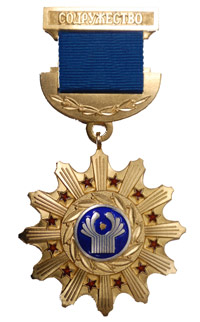
- Native name: Орден «Содружество»
- Type: Intergovernmental decoration
- Presented by: Council of Heads of State of the CIS
- Status: Active
- Established: February 28, 1998

The Order of the Commonwealth (Russian: Орден «Содружество») is an award presented by the Interparliamentary Assembly of the Commonwealth of Independent States (CIS). Established on February 28, 1998, the decoration is conferred upon heads of state, parliamentary speakers, as well as the chairman and Secretary General of the Council of the Interparliamentary Assembly. A person awarded the Order has the right to participate in the work of standing committees, council meetings and plenary sessions of the Interparliamentary Assembly. As of 2009, the number of awardees was more than 200. Among those awarded were the President of Azerbaijan, Ilham Aliyev; the President of Russia, Vladimir Putin; the President of Tajikistan, Emomali Rahmon; the acting President of Moldova, Marian Lupu; and other politicians and public figures.
