= Orlin (given name) =

Orlin is a Bulgarian masculine given name.

- Orlin Anastassov
- Orlin Chalmers
- Orlin Collier
- Orlin Goranov
- Orlin Ninov
- Orlin Norris
- Orlin Orlinov
- Orlin Pavlov
- Orlin Peralta
- Orlin Rusev
- Orlin Stanoytchev
- Orlin Starokin
- Orlin Vallecillo
- Orlin D. Velev
