= Viktor Barannikov =

Soviet-Russian politician and minister (1940–1995)

- Виктор Баранников

Minister of Security
- In office 24 January 1992 – 27 July 1993
- President: Boris Yeltsin
- Preceded by: Himself as Director General of AFB
- Succeeded by: Nikolai Golushko (acting), Office abolished

Director General of the Federal Security Agency of the RSFSR
- In office 15 January – 24 January 1992
- President: Boris Yeltsin
- Preceded by: Viktor Ivanenko
- Succeeded by: Himself as Minister of Security

Minister of Interior of the USSR
- In office 23 August 1991 – 26 December 1991
- President: Mikhail Gorbachev
- Preceded by: Vasily P. Trushin
- Succeeded by: Office abolished

Minister of Interior of the RSFSR
- In office 8 September 1990 – 13 September 1991
- Prime Minister: Ivan Silayev
- Preceded by: Vasily P. Trushin
- Succeeded by: Andrei Dunayev

Personal details
- Born: Viktor Pavlovich Barannikov; 20 October 1940 Fedosyevka, Pozharsky District, Primorsky Krai, RSFSR, Soviet Union
- Died: 21 July 1995 (aged 54) Moscow, Russia
- Resting place: Vagankovo Cemetery, Moscow

Military service
- Allegiance: Soviet Union (1961–1991); Russia (1991–1993)
- Branch/service: Militsiya; Ministry of Internal Affairs; Federal Security Agency; Ministry of Security
- Years of service: 1961–1993
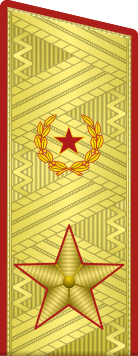
- Rank: Army general

Viktor Pavlovich Barannikov (Russian: Виктор Павлович Баранников; 20 October 1940 — 21 July 1995) was the Soviet Interior Minister in 1991 and Russian Interior Minister from 1992 to 1993.

== Career ==
He was the interior minister of Russian SFSR from September 1990 to September 1991, the interior minister of the USSR after the August Coup against Gorbachev from August 1991 to January 1992. After the collapse of the Soviet Union, he became the Minister of Security and Home Affairs of the Russian SFSR (December 1991 - January 1992). General Director of the Federal Security Agency of the RSFSR (January 1992). Minister of Security of the Russian Federation (January 1992 - July 1993).

Barannikov initiated the transfer of power under the responsibility of the Interior Ministry to individual republics and ordered the militia to stay away from the political chaos engulfing the capital. He was dismissed by the President at the end of July 1993. As an excuse, an incident involving the Border Guard forces on the Soviet-Afghan border and the wasteful lifestyle of his wife Ludmila, which cost taxpayers around $100,000, was used. During the Russian Constitutional Crisis in September–October 1993, he tried to mediate between Boris Yeltsin and Supreme Soviet, who wanted to drag him to her side by nominating him as the Minister of Security. He was arrested and imprisoned for several months, soon after his release he died of a heart attack on July 22, 1995.

He was close to Boris Birshtein and Birshtein's Seabeco.

Buried at the Vagankovo Cemetery in Moscow (section No. 14).
