= Viktor Ivanenko (security officer) =

Soviet-Russian security officer (1947–2023)

- Виктор Иваненко

Director-General of the Federal Security Agency of RSFSR
- In office 26 November 1991 – 15 January 1992
- President: Boris Yeltsin
- Preceded by: position established
- Succeeded by: Viktor Barannikov

Chairman of the KGB of RSFSR
- In office 5 May 1991 – 26 November 1991
- President: Boris Yeltsin
- Preceded by: position re-established
- Succeeded by: position abolished

Personal details
- Born: Viktor Valentinovich Ivanenko; 19 September 1947 Kol'tsovka, Ishimsky District, Tyumen Oblast, Russian SFSR, Soviet Union
- Died: 30 December 2022 (aged 75) Tyumen, Russia
- Party: CPSU
- Education: Industrial Institute of Tyumen
- Occupation: Security officer

Military service
- Allegiance: Soviet Union (1970–1991); Russia (1991–1992)
- Branch/service: KGB; Federal Security Agency
- Years of service: 1970–1992
- Rank: Major general

Viktor Valentinovich Ivanenko (Russian: Ви́ктор Валенти́нович Иване́нко; 19 September 1947 – 30 December 2022) was a Soviet-Russian security officer. A member of the Communist Party, he served as Chairman of the KGB of RSFSR and Director-General of the Federal Security Agency of RSFSR from 1991 to 1992.

Ivanenko died in Moscow on 1 January 2023, at the age of 75.
