= Ministry of Security of the Russian Federation =

Defunct Russian security agency

- Министерство безопасности
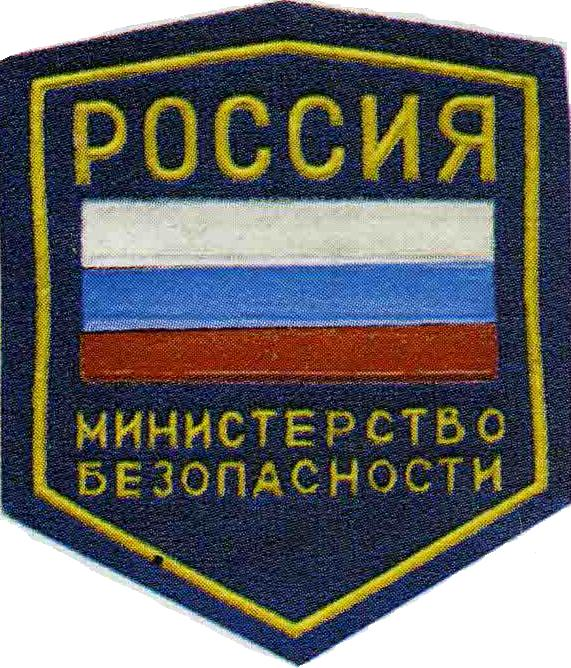

Agency overview
- Formed: 24 January 1992
- Dissolved: 21 December 1993
- Jurisdiction: President of Russia
- Headquarters: Moscow, Russia

The Ministry of Security of the Russian Federation (Russian: Министерство безопасности Российской Федерации) was the central executive body of Russia, responsible for matters of ensuring state security from January 1992 to December 1993.

== History ==
From 1948 to 1953, the Ministry of State Security of the RSFSR existed.

Initially, the Russian Ministry of Defense included counterintelligence, operational, technical and analytical units of the former KGB. According to the staffing table, the minister was supposed to have eight deputies, including one first (throughout the ministry's existence, one deputy position remained vacant), and a ministry board of 17 people was also formed. On the day the ministry was created, January 24, 1992, its leaders were appointed: minister Viktor Barannikov, his first deputy A. A. Oleynikov and 5 deputies.

On the same day, July 27, 1993, Minister V.P. Barannikov was also dismissed (during the events of September-October 1993, he was the Minister of Security of the Russian Federation, according to the Supreme Soviet of Russia and Acting President Alexander Rutskoy). The next day, July 28, the duties of the minister were assigned to the first deputy Nikolai Golushko.

On September 18, 1993, by the decree of President Boris Yeltsin, Golushko was appointed Minister.
