= Candidates in the 2012 Russian presidential election =

2012 Russian presidential candidates
- Opinion polls

This article contains a list of candidates of the 2012 Russian presidential election.

== Registered candidates ==
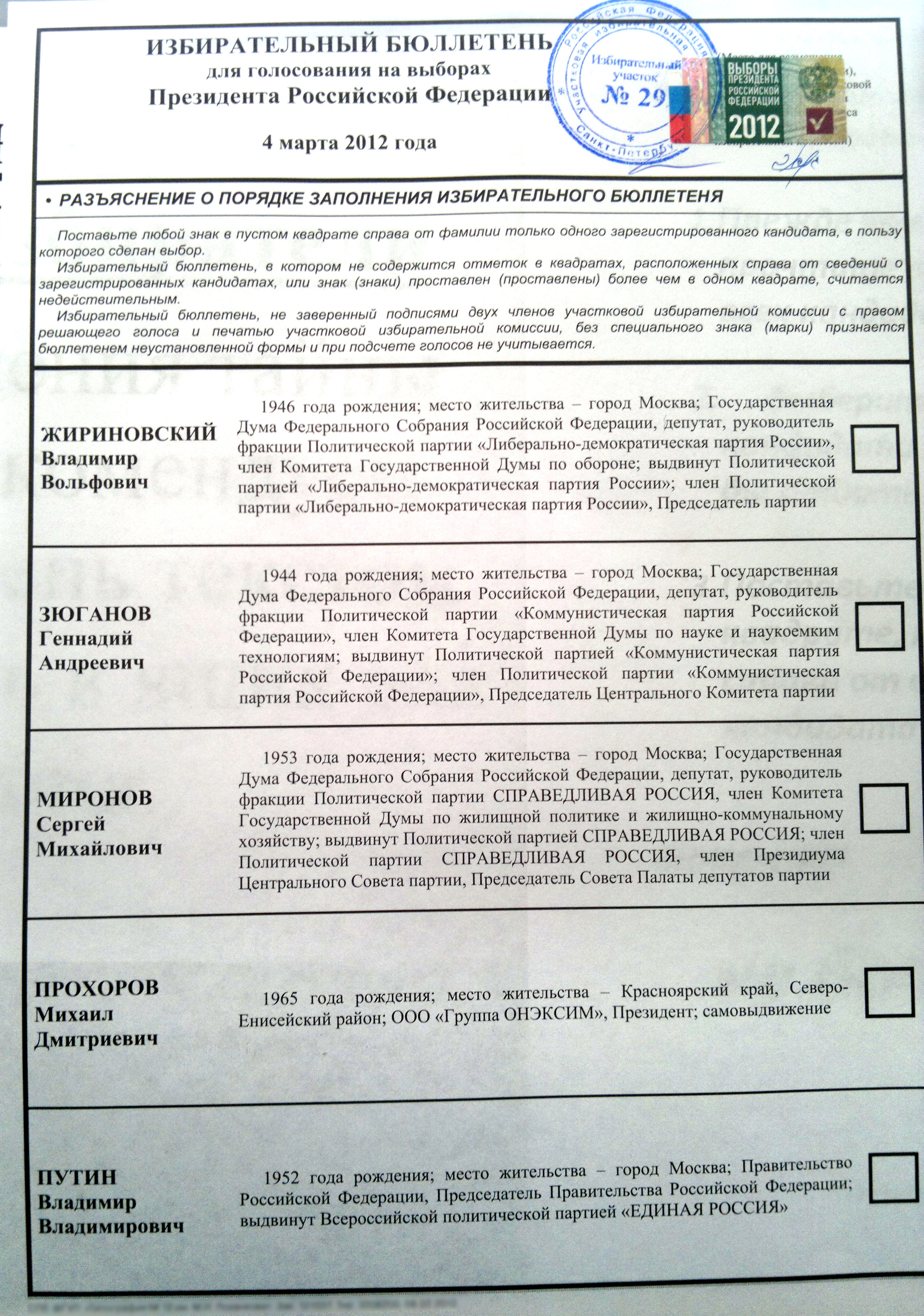
An election ballot listing the presidential candidates

The following candidates were successfully registered by the CEC, candidates are listed in the order they appear on the ballot paper (alphabetical order in Russian):

Candidate name, age, political party	Political offices	Campaign
Vladimir Zhirinovsky (65); Liberal Democratic Party	Deputy of the State Duma (1994–2022); Leader of the Liberal Democratic Party (1991–2022)	(campaign)
Gennady Zyuganov (67); Communist Party	Deputy of the State Duma (1994–present); Leader of the Communist Party (1993–present)	(campaign)
Sergey Mironov (59); A Just Russia	Deputy of the State Duma (2011–present); Leader of A Just Russia (2006–2011 and 2013–present); Chairman of the Federation Council (2001–2011); Senator from St. Petersburg (2001–2011)	
Mikhail Prokhorov (46); Independent	Leader of Right Cause (2011)	(campaign)
Vladimir Putin (59); United Russia	Prime Minister of Russia (1999–2000 and 2008–2012); Leader of United Russia (2008–2012); President of Russia (2000–2008); Director of the Federal Security Service (1998–1999)	(campaign)

== Rejected candidates ==
The following candidates were denied registration by the CEC:

Name	Party	Profession	Reason for rejection
Lidiya Bednaya	Independent	Unknown	Rejected by the CEC because she didn't provide the necessary documentation.
Dmitry Berdnikov	Independent	Leader of the group Against Criminality and Lawlessness	Submitted an application on creation of an initiative committee, but later dropped out of the registration process.
Viktor Cherepkov	Independent	Leader of the unregistered party Freedom and Sovereignty, former mayor of Vladivostok	Did not present any signatures required for registration.
Leonid Ivashov	Independent	Colonel General in Reserve, President of the Academy of Geopolitical Affairs	Registration request from group of voters turned down because he did not inform the CEC about holding a meeting in due time.
Nicolai Levashov	Independent	Writer	Registration request turned down because at the time of registration attempt he had lived in Russia for less than 10 years.
Eduard Limonov	Independent	Writer, leader of the unregistered party The Other Russia	Registration request from group of voters turned down on the grounds that the required initiative committee members signatures had not been certified by a notary.
Rinat Khamiev	Independent	Leader of the Chairman of the People's Patriotic Union of Orenburg, CEO of Zorro LLC	Did not present any signatures required for registration.
Dmitry Mezentsev	Independent	Governor of the Irkutsk Oblast	Rejected due to the large number of invalid signatures he presented.
Boris Mironov	Independent	Writer, former leader of the National Sovereignty Party of Russia	Registration request from group of voters turned down on the grounds that the candidate had been previously convicted of writing extremist texts.
Svetlana Peunova	Independent	Head of the unregistered political party Volya	Rejected due to the lack of signatures gathered to uphold her bid (243,245 signatures gathered out of the necessary 2 million).
Grigory Yavlinsky (campaign)	Yabloko	Politician, Economist	Rejected due to the large number of invalid signatures he presented to the CEC (25.66%).

== Declared candidates who withdrew without registering ==
Many Russian politicians publicly declared their intention to run for president in 2012, but failed to submit their nominations:

- Ivan Okhlobystin, actor. On September 5, 2011 Okhlobystin announced his intention to participate in the election. He intended to run as the candidate of the "Sky Coalition". However, he clarified shortly after this that he would participate only if the Holy Synod of the Russian Orthodox Church granted him permission to run. The Russian Orthodox Church ultimately opposed Okhlobystin's participation in the presidential election and quickly abandoned his plans to run.

== Possible candidates who did not run ==
The following individuals were included in some polls, were referred to in the media as possible candidates or had publicly expressed interest long before the elections but never announced that they would run.

- Dmitry Medvedev

Additionally:

- In December 2010, the Party of People’s Freedom was created with the goal of creating a Russia rid of corruption. At the party's summer 2011 congress it was intended for a single candidate for the presidency of Russia to be nominated by the party to represent the liberal opposition. However, after the party's registration was refused, the party congress in September 2011 signaled that it would not put forth a nominee, declaring that, “The existing procedure for nominating independent candidates to participate in the election of the President of the Russian Federation is in fact prohibitive and deprives the Party of opportunities to participate in them”.
- On December 15, 2010, the leader of the Movement in Defense of the Khimki Forest, Evgenia Chirikova, told Gazeta.ru that in 2012 the movement would nominate its candidate for the presidency of Russia. On December 18, 2011, at the Yabloko party congress, Yevgenia Chirikova suggested that the party nominate Alexei Navalny to the presidency, but this suggestion was refused due to the lack of written consent by Navalny to the nomination (Navalny was under administrative arrest at that time).
