= Transparency International Russia =

Russian non-profit organization related to the Transparency International movement

Transparency International Russia (TI–Russia)
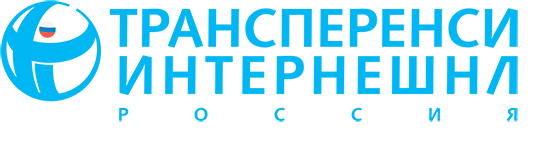
- Founded: 1999
- Founders: Elena Panfilova
- Type: NGO
- Location: Russia (until 2023)
- Key people: Alena Vandysheva (current director)
- Website: ti-russia.org

Transparency International Russia (Центр «Трансперенси Интернешнл — Р», Центр «ТИ-Р», «Трансперенси Интернешнл-Россия», Transparency International — Россия)) is a Russian non-governmental organization focused on combating corruption. From 1999 to 2023, it served as the official representative office of the international organization, Transparency International, in Russia. It later liquidated its legal entity in Russia and continued its work abroad as 'Transparency International Russia in exile' (Трансперенси Интернешнл — Россия в изгнании).

== History ==
The center for anti-corruption research, Transparency International Russia, was founded in 1999. Its founder and first director was Elena Panfilova. The organization's goals were to counter corruption and reduce tolerance of it. Activists emphasized that they did not oppose the state as a whole, but fought violations of Russian and international laws and the principles of transparency and accountability. At various times, regional anti-corruption centers of TI–Russia operated in Saint Petersburg, Veliky Novgorod, Barnaul, Yekaterinburg and Kaliningrad.

In 2014, after Elena Panfilova was elected vice president of the international Transparency International, the Russian chapter was headed by Anton Pominov. In 2021 he was succeeded as chief executive by Ilia Shumanov. In February 2025 Alena Vandysheva, who had worked at TI–Russia since 2010, became the new director.

Funding sources at various times included the Center for Strategic Research of Alexei Kudrin, Transparency International's international secretariat, the non-profit organization Relearn, and the Foundation for Democratic Development.

== Activities ==
Initially, representatives of the authorities invited members of TI–Russia as experts to governmental councils. For example, in 2012 the director of TI–Russia Elena Panfilova joined the Government Commission for the Coordination of the Open Government chaired by Prime Minister Dmitry Medvedev. In 2013 she served as a member of the "Civil G20" in the federal Public Chamber. In the early 2010s TI–Russia represented Russian civil society at international anti-corruption summits. Since 2013 activists noted that repression against civil society in Russia made anti-corruption work more difficult. During this period, the organization's investigations prompted politicians to appeal to the Prosecutor’s Office and the FSB to demand probes into the NGO's activities.

One of Transparency International's methods to fight corruption was conducting investigations. Over the years it released reports on non-transparent presidential grants for NGOs, hidden financing of Russian political parties, violations in public procurement during emergencies, and a 15% increase in retail milk prices attributed to bribes and kickbacks. Based on its investigations, TI–Russia often appealed to the antimonopoly service and the prosecutor's office; however, the results of those inspections were in most cases unclear. In 2016—2017, TI–Russia published an investigation into a luxury residential complex built on land of the Saint Petersburg Mining University. The university's rector and scientific adviser to Vladimir Putin, Vladimir Litvinenko, who handled the real-estate transactions, filed a defamation suit that the court upheld.

To collect and analyze data on the income and property of deputies, officials, judges and other public servants, Transparency International Russia launched the Deklarator project in 2011, which later became independent. By 2018 it had become the largest archive of declarations in Russia and included data on more than 56,000 officials. Over the years, TI–Russia activists reported undeclared real estate owned by State Duma deputy Natalia Poklonskaya and Deputy Prime Minister Dmitry Rogozin, who disputed this information.

Transparency International Russia also prepared rankings assessing the effectiveness of corporate anti-corruption programs. Its reports on corruption were used by foreign politicians and international organizations. Activists cooperated with the Joint Research Centre, the Romanian Academic Society, and with the Higher School of Economics, where they created a project-based training laboratory for anti-corruption policy. They provided support to other civic NGOs and served as media experts.

In addition, the organization educated the public about anti-corruption measures. In 2009 Transparency International Russia launched on its website the 'Anti-Corruption First Aid' and the Anti-Corruption Journal, which offered citizens help in drafting complaints against corrupt officials. Activists held forums, lectures and social campaigns. For example, in 2011, together with the International Youth Human Rights Movement, they conducted the campaign "Five Simple and Clear Amendments for the Police," which promoted straightforward changes to the "On Police" law to increase transparency in police work. One of the amendments adopted into the law was the mandatory wearing of a badge with the officer's photo and details. Later, activists held the "Day of Checking Documents," verifying that on-duty police officers wore their chest badges. In addition, TI–Russia ran the campaign "Corruption Kills," which drew public attention to deaths caused by officials' negligence. In October 2014 activists published a brochure on drafting and implementing codes of ethics for NGOs. Together with Republic.ru they released the podcast "Is It Legal?" which in 2020 was included among the best in the "Blagosfera" ranking.

== Leadership ==
The General directors of Transparency International Russia were:

- Elena Panfilova (1999—2014)
- Anton Pominov (2014—2021)
- Ilia Shumanov (2021—2025)
- Alena Vandysheva (since 2025)

== Persecution and work in exile ==
In early 2015, the Russian Prosecutor's Office began inspections of a number of human rights NGOs, including the Moscow Helsinki Group, the Civic Assistance Committee, and Transparency International Russia. As a result, TI–Russia was asked to enter the register of foreign agents. Elena Panfilova called the decision "ridiculous", since "de facto events devoted to implementing the national anti-corruption plan were deemed political."

In April 2015, Transparency International Russia was included in the foreign-agents register. The organization appealed this decision, insisting that it did not engage in political activity but in "anti-corruption education," but the court dismissed the appeal. Some deputies claimed that the work of TI–Russia posed "a threat to Russia's defense capability, security, and public order."

Staff said that the center's work had become practically impossible, but they continued educational initiatives, supported people in court cases on corruption in local government, and carried out journalistic investigations into complex money-laundering schemes, transnational corruption, and illicit financial flows. Police repeatedly came to activists' lectures, detaining them over false reports of terrorism or over violations of COVID-19 pandemic restrictions.

In the autumn of 2022, the organization's head Ilia Shumanov was declared a foreign agent. In July and August 2023 the Basmanny District Court of Moscow twice held him administratively liable for failure to apply the "foreign agent" label. In August 2024 the Investigative Committee of Russia opened a criminal case against him for "failure to fulfill foreign agent obligations," which carried up to two years in prison.

In March 2023, the Prosecutor General's Office of the Russian Federation designated the international movement Transparency International as an undesirable organization. The agency treated as political activity the activists' proposals to introduce criminal liability for illicit enrichment, to abolish the foreign-agent status for NGOs, and to end excessive regulation of the media. Russian law provides criminal liability for cooperation with undesirable organizations. Fearing persecution by the authorities, the leadership of the Russian chapter of Transparency International decided to close the legal entity in Russia. In late September 2024, the Ministry of Justice removed Transparency International Russia from the list of foreign agents due to the liquidation of the legal entity.

In October 2023, 'Transparency International Russia in exile' (Трансперенси Интернешнл — Россия в изгнании) began operations. The leadership stated that it would continue civic resistance to corruption in Russia. Data on the team are not disclosed for security reasons, but it is known that the chapter was headed by Ilia Shumanov.

The new team's goal was to investigate cross-border money-laundering schemes and corruption linked to the Russia's invasion of Ukraine. Together with Novaya Gazeta it published investigations about the nationalization of around 180 private companies over the two years since the start of the war, the links between the deaths of top Gazprom managers and money laundering, and cases of trade-based money laundering from Russia to the United Kingdom. The organization's experts condemned the ongoing militarization and human-rights violations in Russia.

On 27 December 2024, the Russian Ministry of Justice designated 'Transparency International Russia in exile' as a "foreign agent." In response, the organization stated that its work would continue unchanged in a safe jurisdiction.

== See also ==
- Anti-Corruption Foundation
- United Nations Convention against Corruption
- Asset declaration
