= Civil Initiatives Committee =

Civil Initiatives Committee Комитет гражданских инициатив
- Abbreviation: KGI (English); КГИ (Russian)
- Chairman: Yevgeny Yasin
- Founder: Alexei Kudrin
- Founded: 5 April 2012; 13 years ago
- Headquarters: 3/5th Building, Gazetnyy Lane, Moscow, Russia
- Ideology: Liberalism
- Political position: Centre-right
- Colours: Orange

Website
- https://komitetgi.ru/

The Civil Initiatives Committee (CIC or KGI; Russian: Комитет гражданских инициатив; КГИ; Komitet grazhdanskikh initsiativ) is a liberal community of politicians, experts, and public figures. It positions itself as a non-partisan association of professionals in key areas of public life, including the economy, science, education, healthcare, and culture, united around the idea of modernising the country and strengthening democratic institutions.

The committee was established on April 5, 2012, by Alexei Kudrin and a number of other politicians and public figures, with the stated aim of determining and implementing optimal options for the country's development.

The name of the committee was co-authored with Andrey Nechaev. Plans to create a political party under the same name were postponed after Kudrin held discussions with Vladimir Putin, following which it was decided that establishing a committee was more appropriate at that stage. Subsequently, under the chairmanship of Nechaev, the party Civic Initiative was established; Kudrin did not become a member of this party.

The formation of the committee followed the 2011 legislative elections and the subsequent protests, including rallies held on Bolotnaya Square on December 10 and on Academician Sakharov Avenue in Moscow on December 24, 2011. In a statement announcing the creation of the committee, published on Kudrin's official website, it was stated that the elections had demonstrated citizens' desire to exert genuine influence over state affairs and to participate in determining the country's future direction.

== Foundation for Support of Civil Initiatives "Dialogue" ==
Since September 2017, the Kudrin Foundation for the Development of Civil Initiatives has supported the committee's activities. On September 4, 2018, the foundation was renamed the Dialogue Foundation for the Development of Civil Initiatives. The foundation serves as the organiser and administrator of the committee's research, information, analytical, and advisory work. Its primary sources of funding are property contributions and donations from Russian individuals and legal entities.

== Targets and goals ==
In a statement announcing the committee's establishment, its founders outlined the organisation's main objectives:

- the creation of infrastructure to support civil initiatives;
- opposition to the actions of public authorities, irrespective of specific individuals or offices;
- the development of proposals for public discussion and civic review of alternative approaches to addressing political, economic, and social issues.

The committee's priority projects include:

- Fair trial – promoting the real independence of the judiciary, including the election of court presidents.
- School of Local Government – the identification, analysis, and dissemination of best practices in local governance.
- Open budget – increasing transparency in the formulation and execution of the budget at all levels, including the municipal level.
- Transparent Police – the publication of detailed crime statistics, public auditing, and the election of department heads.
- Civic Mutual Aid – strengthening horizontal ties within society.
- Health care for all – advocating a transition from a largely unregulated market of paid medical services to a system providing quality healthcare for all categories of citizens.
- Equal Start – promoting universal access to quality education to support successful entry into the labour market.

== Activities of the Civil Initiatives Committee ==
Throughout its work, the committee's experts have conducted numerous studies that have resulted in the preparation of dozens of analytical reports and legislative initiatives. These have addressed a wide range of issues, including the pension system; education and healthcare; elections and the electoral system; local self-government; law enforcement and the judicial system; migration and demographic processes; public oversight; open data; mass media; the specific conditions of the North Caucasus regions; Russia's position in the global economy; and trends in public opinion and social attitudes.

At the initiative of committee members, the Free Historical Society was established, with the stated aim of protecting historical scholarship from political influence.

With the committee's participation, the Mediastandard Foundation was also created, which conducts research on media institutions in Russia's regions.

Each year, the Civil Initiatives Committee organises the Civil Initiative Prize competition, in which 11 laureates receive the Golden Sprout statuette and a monetary award.

The committee also participates in the promotion of participatory budgeting practices. In 2016, projects with a total value of approximately 4.5 billion rubles were implemented on this basis in several dozen regions of the country.

As part of its educational activities, the committee established KGI University, whose in-person and online programmes have been attended by several thousand participants.

In cooperation with major public organisations, the committee has organised the All-Russian Civil Forum for four consecutive years, an annual forum bringing together representatives of Russian civil society to discuss current issues and develop joint proposals.

With the committee's support, dozens of books have been published, and several educational websites have been developed and maintained. The committee also holds regular meetings to discuss current issues and periodically issues public statements assessing significant events and trends in the country's development.

== List of committee members ==
- Alexander Arkhangelsky
- Ivan Begtin
- Nikita Belykh
- Sergei Borisov
- Andrey Galiyev
- Leonid Gozman
- Evgeny Gontmakher
- Yakov Gordin
- Yuli Gusman
- Mikhail Dmitriev
- Anatoly Ermolin
- Kirill Kabanov
- Irina Karelina
- Valeria Kasamara
- Andrey Kolesnikov
- Yuri Komarov
- Alexei Kudrin
- Vasily Melnichenko
- Vladimir Nazarov
- Andrey Nechaev
- Dmitry Oreshkin
- Viktor Pleskachevsky
- Vladimir Pozner
- Igor Pototsky
- Joseph Raihelgauz
- Alexander Rubtsov
- Nikolai Svanidze
- Dmitry Travin
- Mark Urnov
- Vitaly Ushkanov
- Sergey Tsyplyaev
- Igor Yurgens
- Yana Yakovleva
- Yevgeny Yasin
- Irina Yasina

== Analytical reports ==
The committee's first analytical review focused on the regional elections held on October 14, 2012.

== All-Russian Civil Forum ==
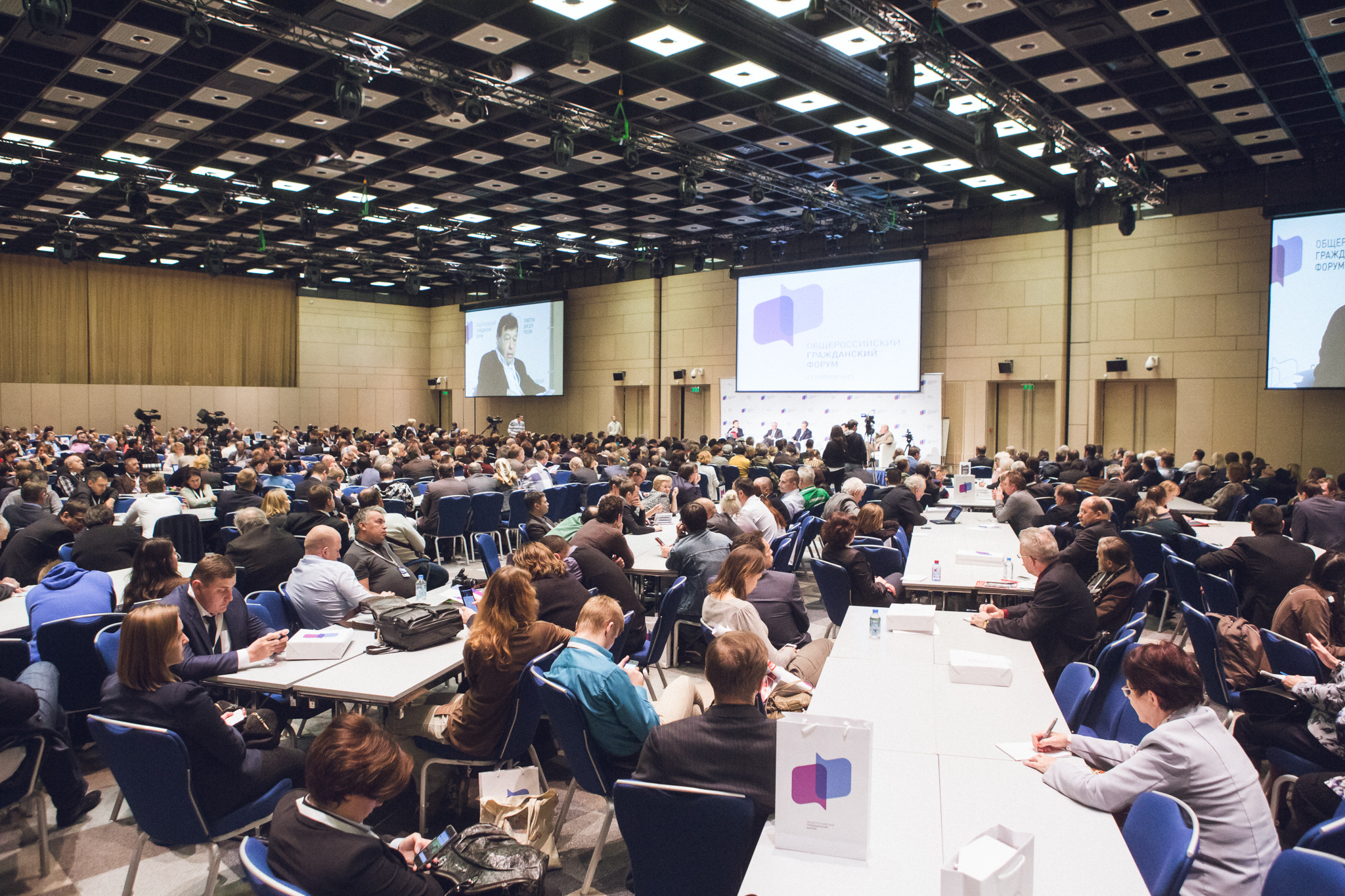
All-Russian Civil Forum, 2013

On November 3, 2013, the Civil Initiatives Committee and the Kudrin Foundation held the first All-Russian Civil Forum in Moscow. According to the forum's official website, the initiative to convene a forum of civil society representatives was a response to what organisers described as contradictory state policy toward the non-profit sector.

In July 2013, ten prominent Russian public figures proposed convening the forum. These included Lyudmila Alekseeva, Evgeny Gontmakher, Anatoly Ermolin, Alexey Kudrin, Elena Panfilova, Irina Prokhorova, Alexey Simonov, Elena Topoleva-Soldunova, Igor Chestin, and Irina Yasina.

The organisers describe the forum as a platform that enables representatives of civil society to participate in the development of proposals concerning the country's future development.

The second All-Russian Civil Forum was held on November 22, 2014, at the Cosmos Hotel in Moscow, under the theme "Dialogue. Solidarity. Responsibility."

At the third forum, held on November 21–22, 2015, Alexey Kudrin stated that participation by representatives of public authorities in the event required coordination with relevant ministries and the Presidential Administration.

The fifth All-Russian Civil Forum took place on November 25, 2017, at the Cosmos Hotel in Moscow, under the theme "The Future of Russia: Federation, Regions, Cities." The forum was attended by heads of federal and regional agencies, ministers and deputy ministers, governors, vice-governors, and city mayors. Participants included Moscow Mayor Sergey Sobyanin, Mikhail Abyzov, then Minister for Open Government, Health Minister Veronika Skvortsova, Central Election Commission chair Ella Pamfilova, and Deputy Minister of Justice Denis Novak.

== Criticism ==
Experts and politicians have offered differing assessments of the initiative to establish the committee, ranging from views that describe it as a genuine attempt to promote positive change to criticisms characterising it as a pro-Kremlin project intended to divert the liberal community from more radical forms of protest.

== See also ==
- Gaidar Forum
