= 2012 Russian presidential election =

- 4 March 2012
- Opinion polls
- Registered: 109,860,331
- Turnout: 65.27% (▼4.44pp)
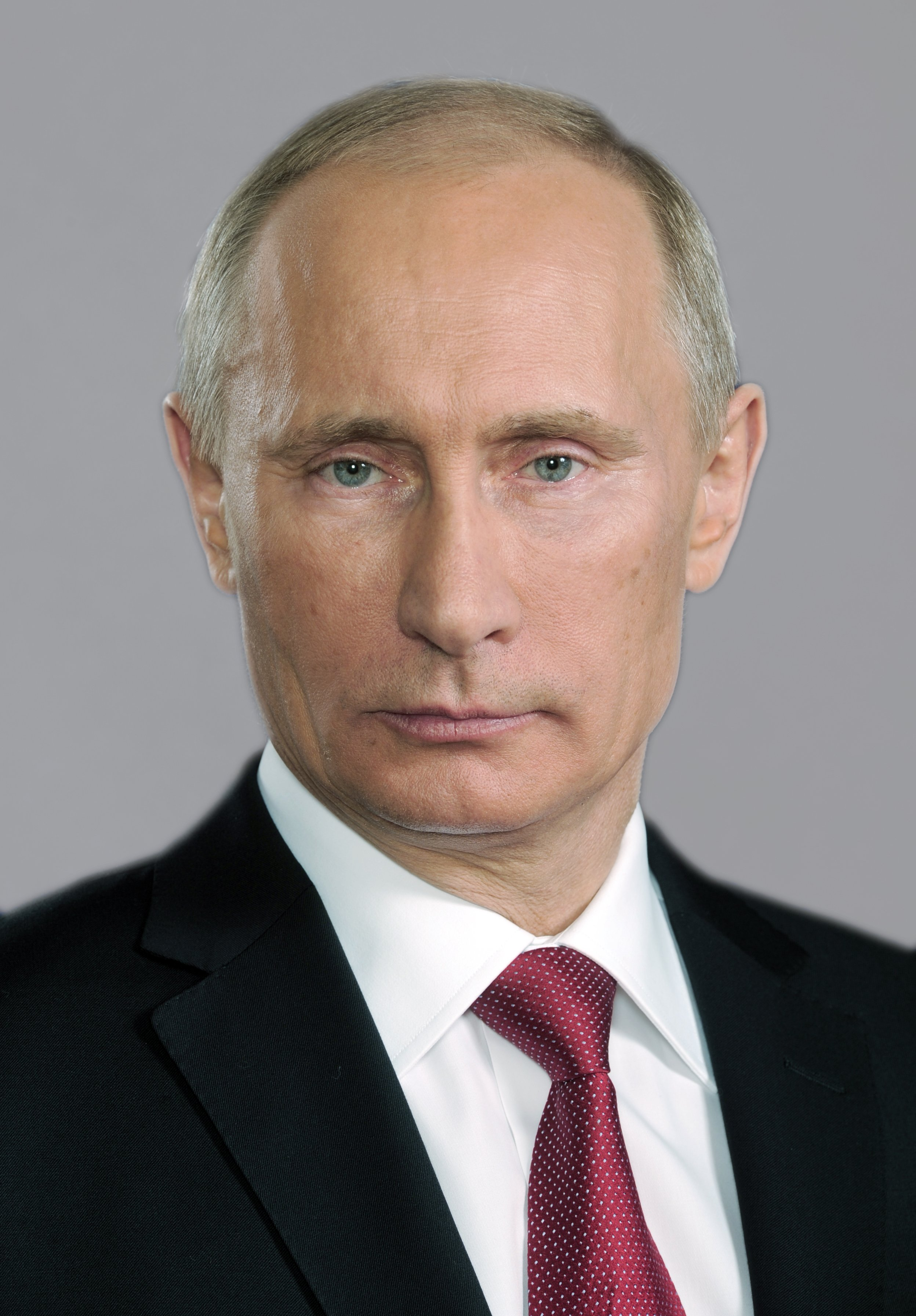

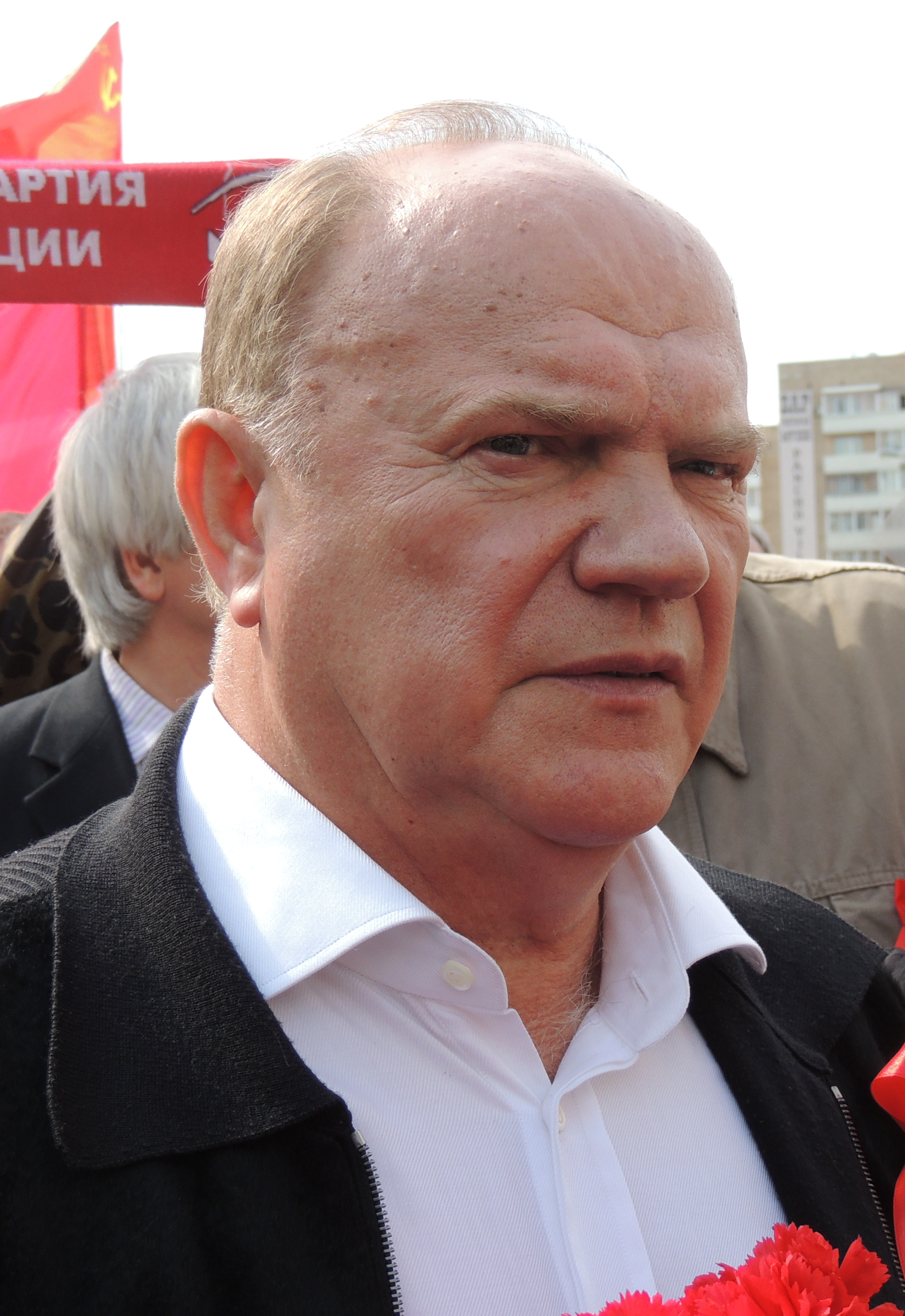

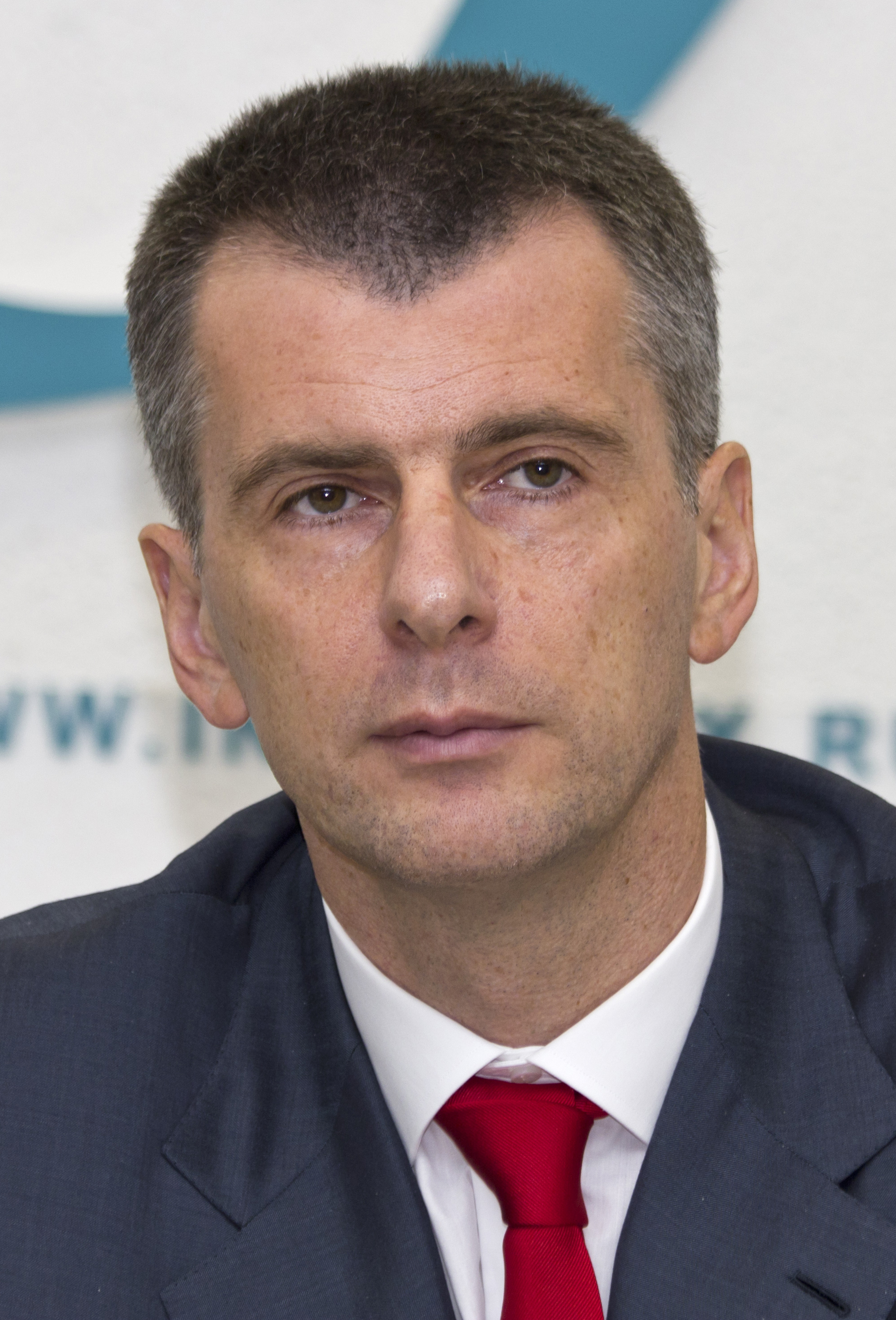

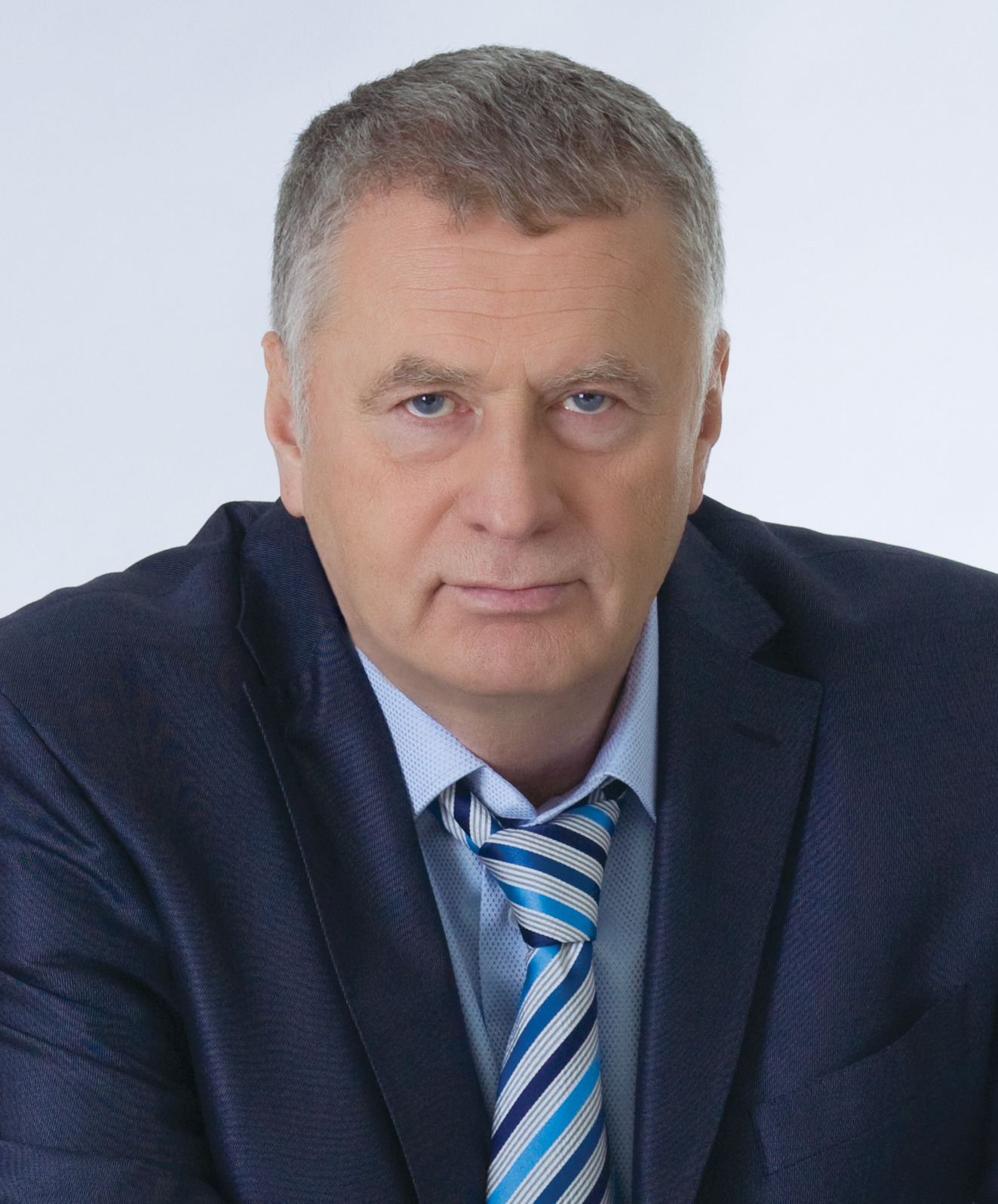
Nominee	Vladimir Putin	Gennady Zyuganov
Party	United Russia	CPRF
Popular vote	45,602,075	12,318,353
Percentage	64.35%	17.38%
Nominee	Mikhail Prokhorov	Vladimir Zhirinovsky
Party	Independent	LDPR
Popular vote	5,722,508	4,458,103
Percentage	8.08%	6.29%
- Results by federal subject Vladimir Putin: 45–50% 50–55% 55–60% 60–65% 65–70% 70–75% 75–80% 80–85% 85–90% 90–95% >95%
President before election
Dmitry Medvedev
United Russia
Elected President
Vladimir Putin
United Russia

Presidential elections were held in Russia on 4 March 2012. There were five officially registered candidates: four representatives of registered parties, and one nominal independent. The election was the first one held after constitutional amendments were introduced in 2008, in which the elected president for the first time would serve a six-year term, rather than a four-year term.

At the congress of the ruling United Russia party in Moscow on 24 September 2011, the incumbent president Dmitry Medvedev proposed that his predecessor, Vladimir Putin, stand for the presidency in 2012, an offer which Putin accepted. Putin immediately offered Medvedev the opportunity to stand on the United Russia ticket in the parliamentary elections in December 2011 and become prime minister at the end of his presidential term. All independents had to register by 15 December 2011, and candidates nominated by parties were required to register by 18 January 2012. The final list was announced on 29 January. On 2 March, outgoing president Medvedev addressed the nation on the national television channels about the upcoming elections, inviting citizens to vote.

Putin received 63.6% of the vote, securing a third overall term. Organization for Security and Co-operation in Europe observers assessed the voting on the election day positively overall, but assessed the vote count negatively in almost one-third of polling stations due to procedural irregularities.

== Candidates ==
The following individuals submitted documents to the Russian Central Election Commission (CEC) in order to be officially registered as presidential candidates.

=== Registered candidates ===
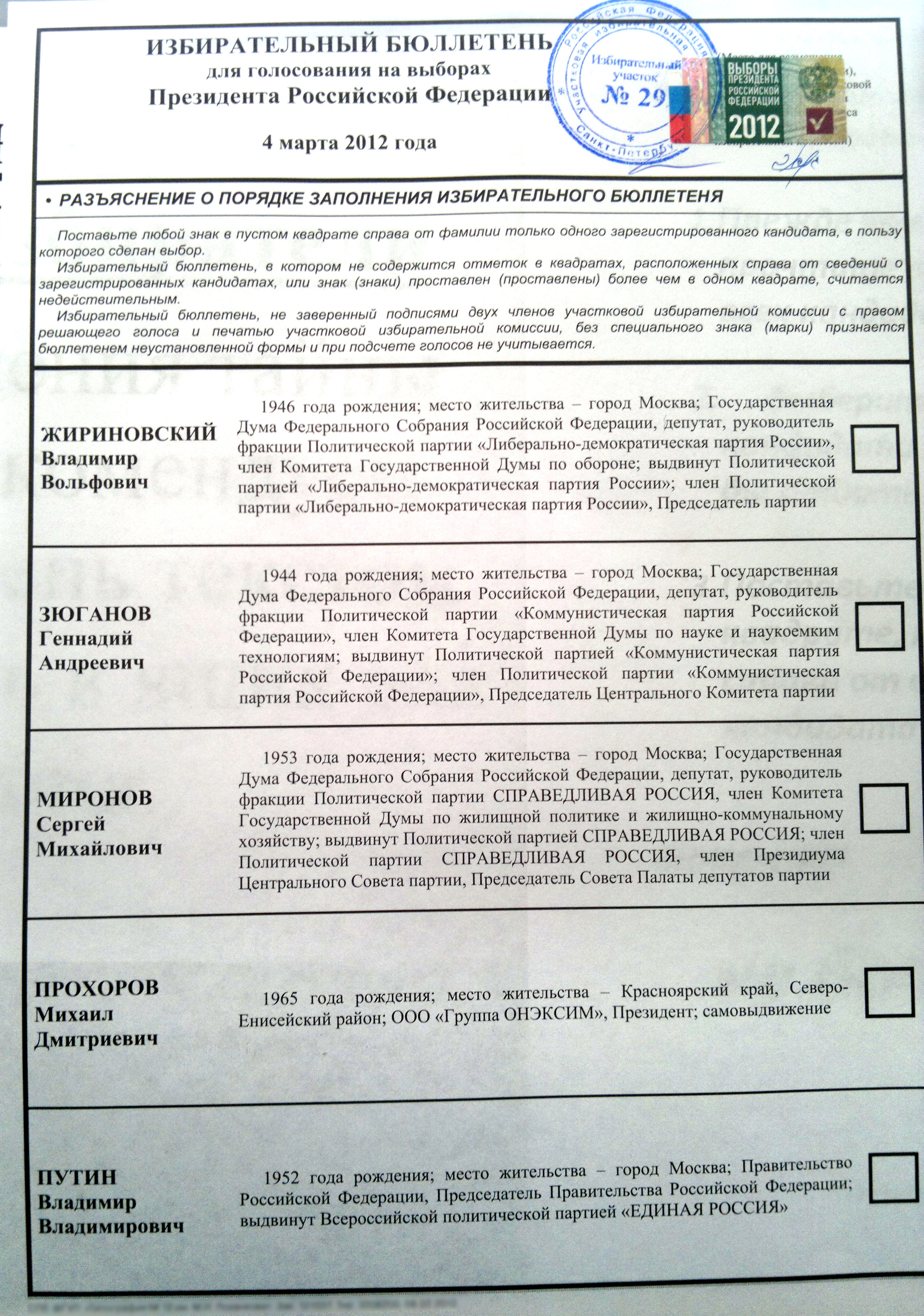
An election ballot listing the presidential candidates

The following candidates were successfully registered by the CEC, candidates are listed in the order they appear on the ballot paper (alphabetical order in Russian):

Candidate name, age, political party	Political offices	Campaign
Vladimir Zhirinovsky (65); Liberal Democratic Party	Deputy of the State Duma (1993–2022); Leader of the Liberal Democratic Party (1991–2022)	(campaign)
Gennady Zyuganov (67); Communist Party	Deputy of the State Duma (1993–present); Leader of the Communist Party (1993–present)	(campaign)
Sergey Mironov (59); A Just Russia	Deputy of the State Duma (2011–present); Leader of A Just Russia (2006–2011 and 2013–present); Chairman of the Federation Council (2001–2011); Senator from St. Petersburg (2001–2011)	(campaign)
Mikhail Prokhorov (46); Independent	Leader of Right Cause (2011)	(campaign)
Vladimir Putin (59); United Russia	Prime Minister of Russia (1999–2000 and 2008–2012); Leader of United Russia (2008–2012); President of Russia (2000–2008); Director of the Federal Security Service (1998–1999)	(campaign)

== Campaigning ==
=== Sergey Mironov ===
A Just Russia nominee called for a return to a socialist model of government.

=== Mikhail Prokhorov ===
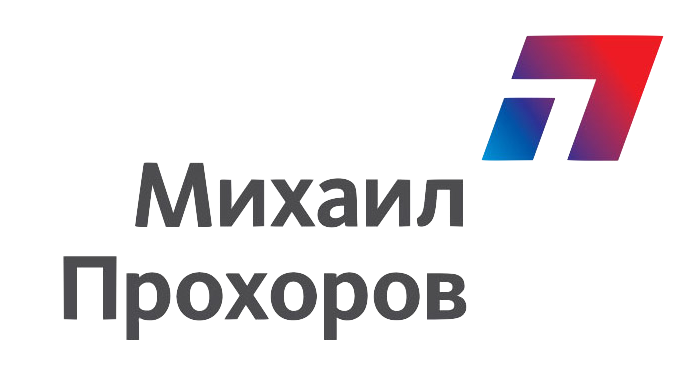

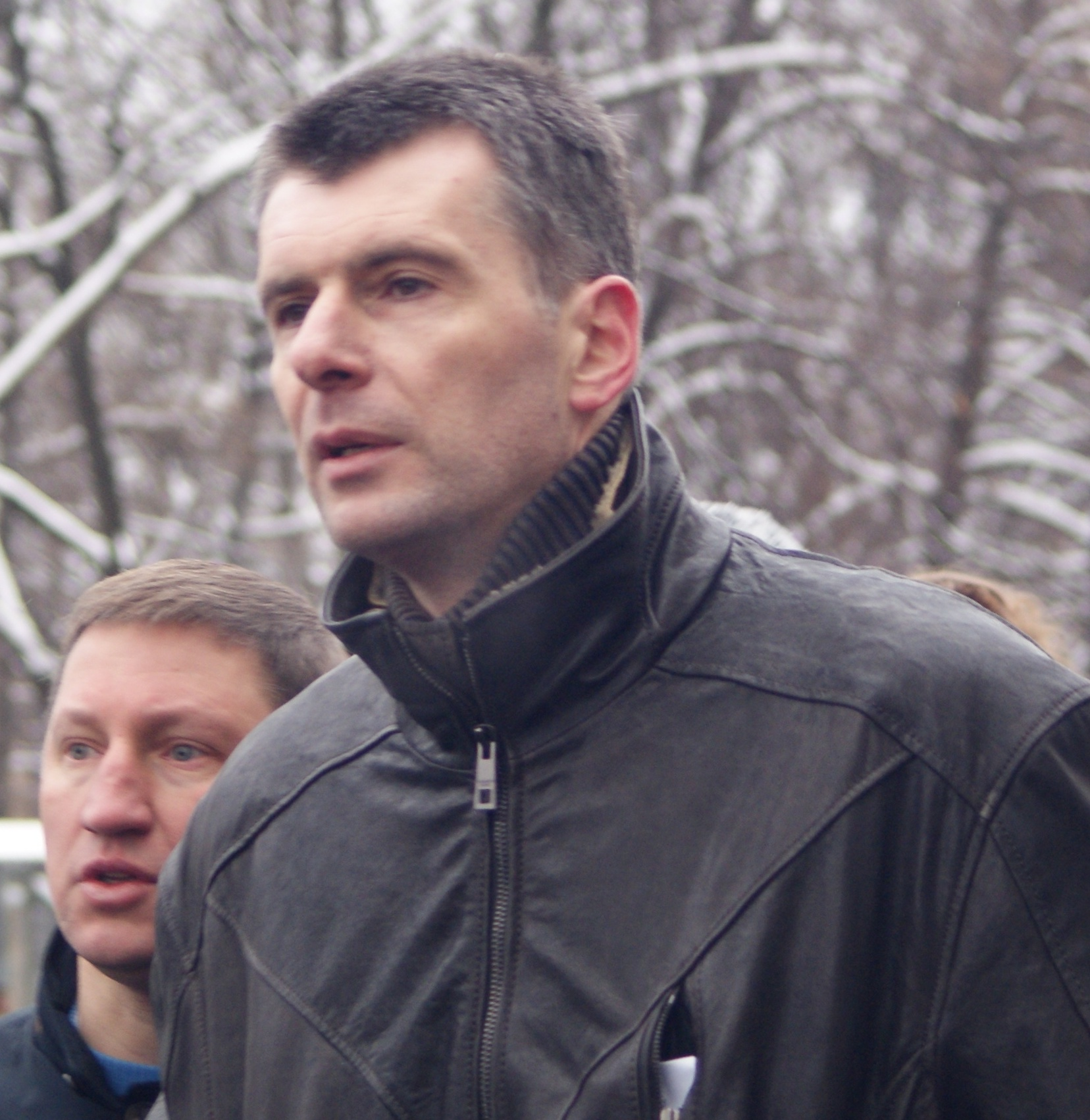
Prokhorov campaigning

Mikhail Prokhorov conducted a tour around the country, meeting with his supporters in various cities. He was the only candidate to do so except for Putin, who visited Russia's regions as a part of his Prime Minister of Russia duties.

If elected, Prokhorov promised to reinstate elections for Russia's governorships. He also promised to pardon Mikhail Khodorkovsky. He promised to reverse the recent constitutional amendment that had lengthened presidential terms from four years to six. He stated that he would select Alexei Kudrin to serve as his prime minister. Prokhorov promised to dismantle state control of the media and prohibit all forms of censorship and state control of major television and radio stations. He promised to dismantle large energy monopolies, including dismantling Gazprom. He also stated that he favored better relations with the European Union.

=== Vladimir Putin ===

In the course of the 2012 presidential campaign, in order to present his manifesto, Putin published 7 articles in different Russian newspapers. In those articles, he presented his vision of the problems which Russia successfully solved in the last decade and the goals yet to be achieved. The topics of the articles were as follows: the general overview, the ethnicity issue, economic tasks, democracy and government efficiency, social policy, military and foreign policy.

==== Speeches ====
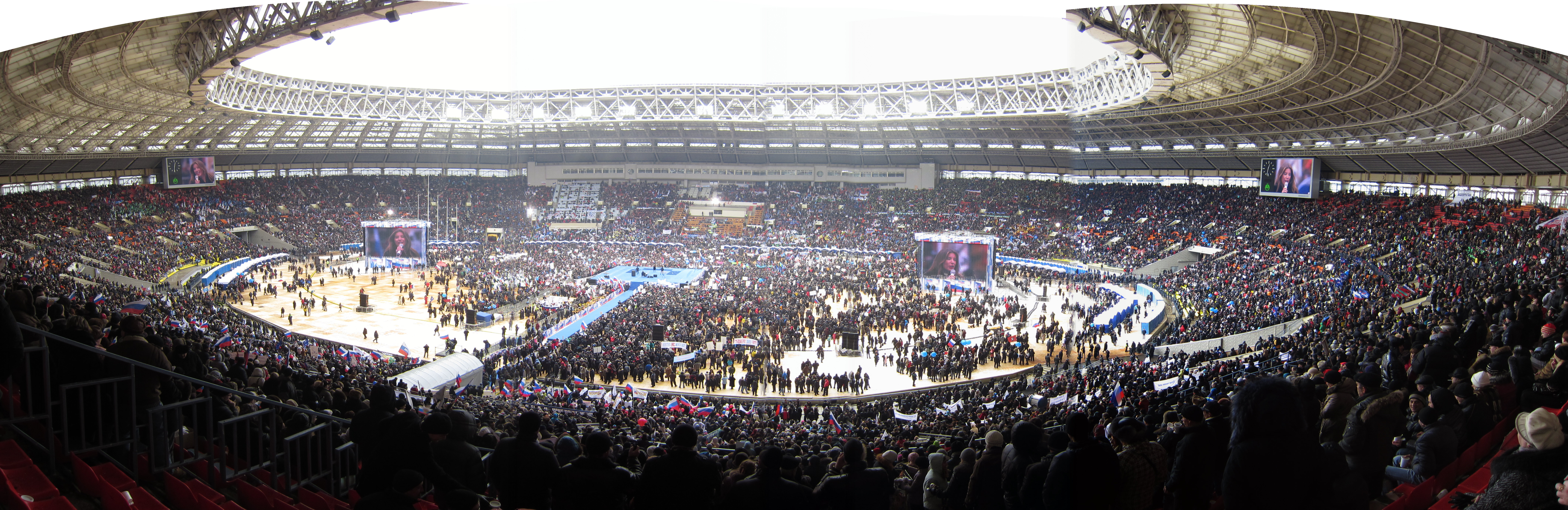
Panorama of the 23 February Luzhniki rally, where Putin made his Borodino speech

During the campaign Putin made a single outdoor public speech at a rally of his supporters in the Luzhniki Stadium on 23 February, Russia's Defender of the Fatherland Day. In the speech, he called on the Russian people not to betray the Motherland, but to love her and to unite for the common good. He said that foreign interference in Russian affairs should not be allowed, and Russia's national sovereignty should be paramount. He compared the political situation (when there was widespread fear that the 2011–13 Russian protests could instigate a color revolution directed from abroad) with the First Fatherland War (more generally known as Napoleon Bonaparte's invasion of Russia), reminding listeners that the 200th anniversary of the Battle of Borodino would be celebrated in 2012. Putin cited Lermontov's poem Borodino and ended the speech with Vyacheslav Molotov's famous Great Patriotic War slogan "The Victory Shall Be Ours!" ("Победа будет за нами!").

The BBC reported that some attendees claimed they had been ordered by their employers to take part in the rally, or paid to do so. Some said they had been told they were attending a "folk festival". After Putin spoke, popular folk band Lubeh took to the stage.

=== Vladimir Zhirinovsky ===
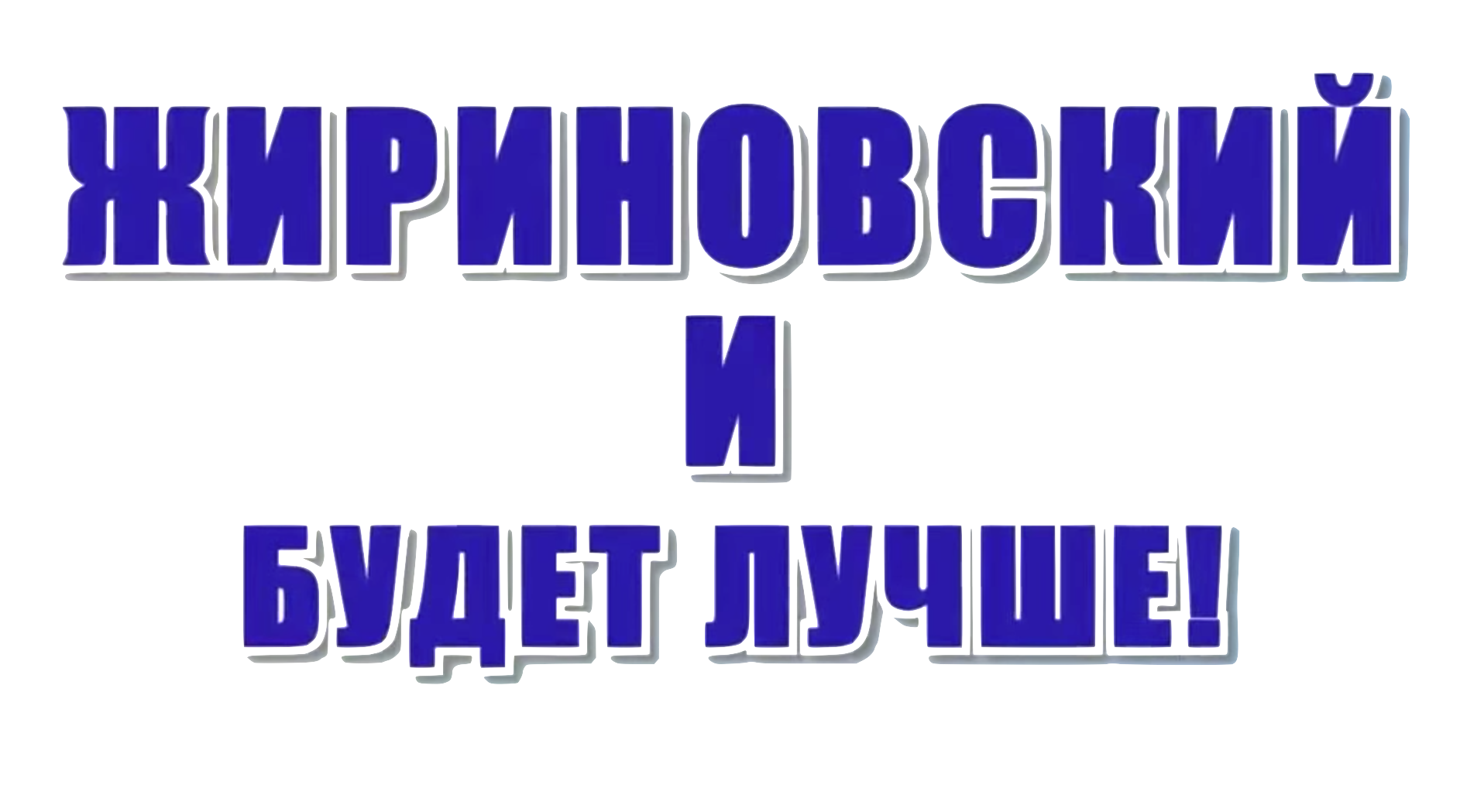

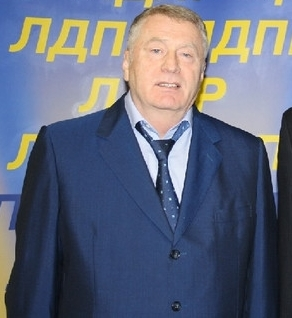
Zhirinovsky campaigning

Vladimir Volfovich Zhirinovsky is a veteran of Russian politics who has participated in five presidential elections in Russia (every election since 1996). Zhirinovsky's campaign slogan for 2012 was "Vote Zhirinovsky, or things will get worse". Proshka, a donkey owned by Vladimir Zhirinovsky, became prominent during the presidential campaign, when he was filmed in an election advertisement video.

=== Gennady Zyuganov ===
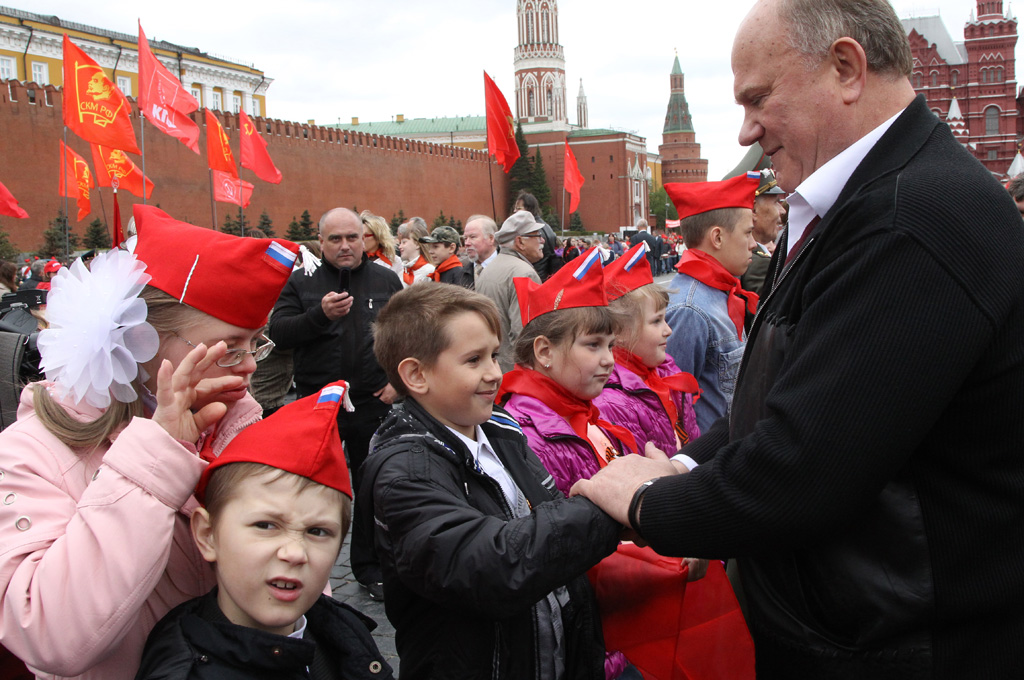
Zyuganov campaigning in Red Square

In September 2011 Gennady Zyuganov again became the CPRF's candidate for the Russian presidential election.

== Results ==
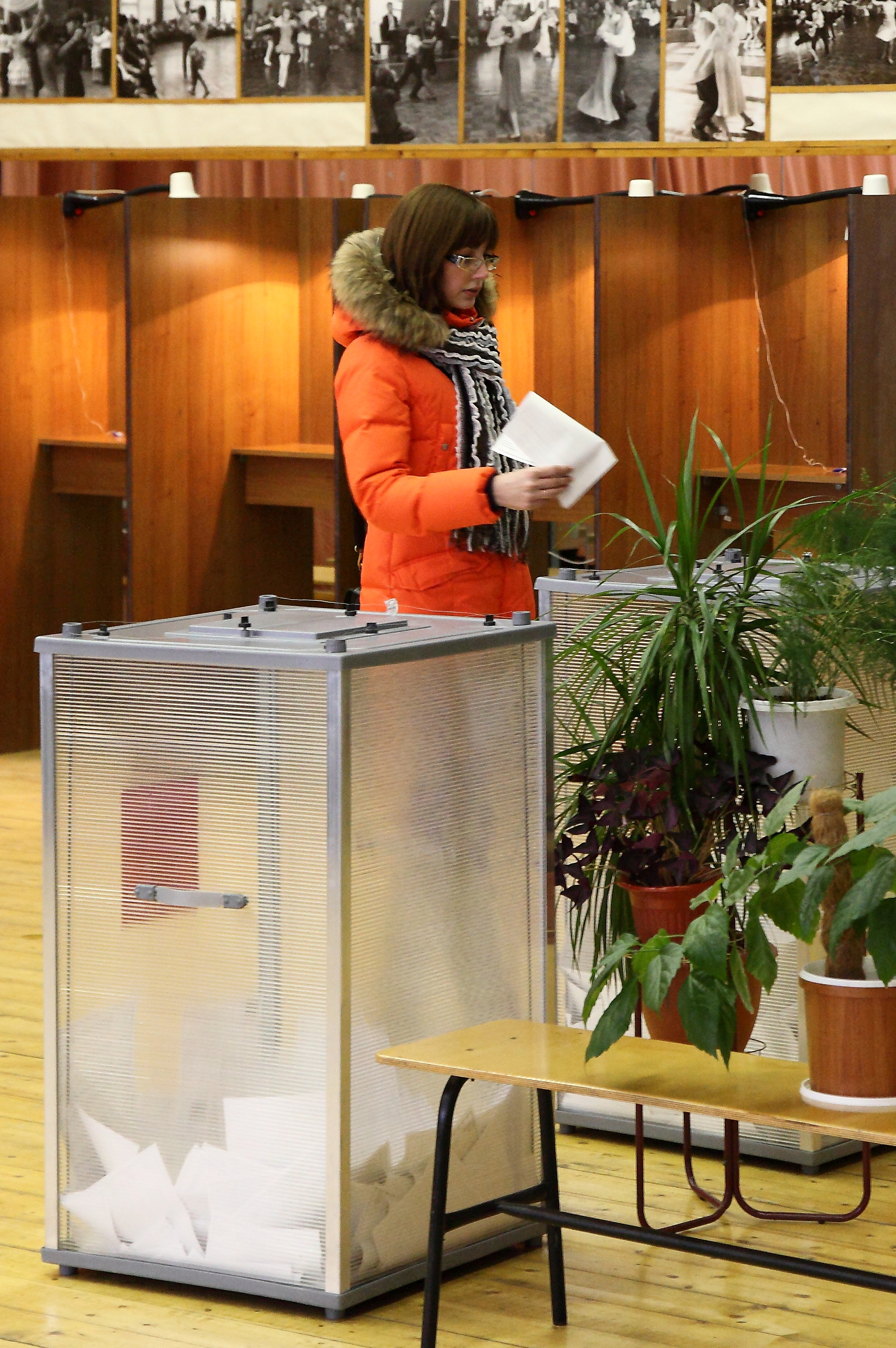
Election of the President of the Russian Federation (2012)

Candidate	Party	Votes	%
Vladimir Putin	United Russia	45,602,075	64.35
Gennady Zyuganov	Communist Party	12,318,353	17.38
Mikhail Prokhorov	Independent	5,722,508	8.08
Vladimir Zhirinovsky	Liberal Democratic Party	4,458,103	6.29
Sergey Mironov	A Just Russia	2,763,935	3.90
Total		70,864,974	100.00
Valid votes		70,864,974	98.83
Invalid/blank votes		836,691	1.17
Total votes		71,701,665	100.00
Registered voters/turnout		109,860,331	65.27
Source: CEC

There were over 108,000,000 eligible voters and almost all 95,000 polling stations had webcams to observe the voting process. Following criticism of the vote in the December elections, 2 web cameras were dedicated to streaming the activities at each polling station, at an expense of five million dollars, i.e. about $50 per polling station.

=== By federal subject ===
Region	Vladimir Putin United Russia		Gennady Zyuganov Communist Party		Mikhail Prokhorov Independent		Vladimir Zhirinovsky Liberal Democratic Party		Sergey Mironov A Just Russia		Invalid votes	
Region	Votes	%	Votes	%	Votes	%	Votes	%	Votes	%	Votes	%
Adygea	141,257	64.07%	45,311	20.55%	13,145	5.96%	11,164	5.06%	6,637	3.01%	2,967	1.35%
Altai Krai	674,139	57.35%	261,665	22.26%	83,778	7.13%	97,961	8.33%	45,883	3.90%	12,004	1.02%
Altai Republic	68,110	66.87%	17,229	16.92%	6,265	6.15%	5,704	5.60%	3,406	3.34%	1,141	1.12%
Amur Oblast	251,182	62.84%	67,433	16.87%	23,070	5.77%	39,717	9.94%	13,594	3.40%	4,708	1.18%
Arkhangelsk Oblast	333,344	57.97%	91,648	15.94%	60,108	10.45%	51,169	8.90%	33,223	5.78%	5,522	0.96%
Astrakhan Oblast	297,448	68.76%	67,662	15.64%	21,873	5.06%	21,918	5.07%	18,595	4.30%	5,107	1.18%
Baikonur	7,509	70.79%	1,288	12.14%	722	6.81%	586	5.52%	317	2.99%	185	1.74%
Bashkortostan	1,731,716	75.28%	326,250	14.18%	83,667	3.64%	83,704	3.64%	57,329	2.49%	17,592	0.76%
Belgorod Oblast	533,716	59.30%	21,1079	23.45%	49,807	5.53%	59,561	6.62%	35,601	3.96%	10,209	1.13%
Bryansk Oblast	448,018	64.02%	146,340	20.91%	32,141	4.59%	42,974	6.14%	23,453	3.35%	6,922	0.99%
Buryatia	275,466	66.20%	75,082	18.04%	24,430	5.87%	22,211	5.34%	13,994	3.36%	4,921	1.18%
Chechnya	611,578	99.76%	182	0.03%	129	0.02%	140	0.02%	165	0.03%	876	0.14%
Chelyabinsk Oblast	1,124,538	65.02%	254,542	14.72%	138,907	8.03%	97,869	5.66%	88,177	5.10%	25,366	1.47%
Chukotka	21,310	72.64%	2,651	9.04%	2,209	7.53%	2,106	7.18%	633	2.16%	428	1.46%
Chuvashia	438,070	62.32%	144,676	20.58%	38,838	5.52%	39,707	5.65%	31,201	4.44%	10,465	1.49%
Dagestan	1,322,567	92.84%	84,669	5.94%	6,427	0.45%	1,523	0.11%	4,163	0.29%	5,155	0.36%
Ingushetia	153,274	91.91%	7,422	4.45%	1,934	1.16%	1,944	1.17%	1,761	1.06%	428	0.26%
Irkutsk Oblast	594,861	55.45%	242,097	22.57%	94,008	8.76%	88,419	8.24%	41,152	3.84%	12,186	1.14%
Ivanovo Oblast	321,170	61.85%	95,005	18.30%	37,016	7.13%	37,650	7.25%	23,060	4.44%	5,338	1.03%
Jewish Autonomous Oblast	48,912	61.59%	14,796	18.63%	5,102	6.42%	6,632	8.35%	2,763	3.48%	1,208	1.52%
Kabardino-Balkaria	299,529	77.64%	53,261	13.81%	8,937	2.32%	11,888	3.08%	11,753	3.05%	418	0.11%
Kaliningrad Oblast	240,421	52.55%	97,570	21.33%	62,016	13.56%	35,625	7.79%	16,139	3.53%	5,712	1.25%
Kalmykia	93,500	70.30%	23,295	17.51%	8,029	6.04%	3,374	2.54%	3,562	2.68%	1,242	0.93%
Kaluga Oblast	299,175	59.02%	101,459	20.01%	40,911	8.07%	37,634	7.42%	21,427	4.23%	6,327	1.25%
Kamchatka Krai	93,738	59.84%	25,009	15.97%	14,015	8.95%	16,504	10.54%	5,430	3.47%	1,951	1.25%
Karachay-Cherkessia	266,410	91.36%	16,937	5.81%	2,629	0.90%	2,851	0.98%	2,162	0.74%	631	0.22%
Karelia	171,380	55.38%	50,957	16.47%	37,798	12.22%	26,579	8.59%	18,886	6.10%	3,839	1.24%
Kemerovo Oblast	1,267,837	77.19%	133,705	8.14%	75,519	4.60%	112,067	6.82%	37,450	2.28%	16,002	0.97%
Khabarovsk Krai	367,239	56.15%	115,436	17.65%	62,145	9.50%	68,500	10.47%	31,944	4.88%	8,733	1.34%
Khakassia	144,519	58.40%	50,872	20.56%	19,400	7.84%	20,991	8.48%	8,878	3.59%	2,819	1.14%
Khanty–Mansi Autonomous Okrug	469,822	66.41%	97,651	13.80%	50,526	7.14%	57,400	8.11%	23,276	3.29%	8,829	1.25%
Kirov Oblast	399,810	57.93%	127,982	18.54%	63,993	9.27%	54,531	7.90%	36,005	5.22%	7,864	1.14%
Komi Republic	341,864	65.02%	70,135	13.34%	43,759	8.32%	40,314	7.67%	22,738	4.32%	6,970	1.33%
Kostroma Oblast	183,984	52.78%	90,714	26.02%	26,517	7.61%	28,204	8.09%	16,094	4.62%	3,076	0.88%
Krasnodar Krai	1,715,349	63.72%	496,909	18.46%	181,844	6.75%	176,119	6.54%	88,976	3.31%	32,893	1.22%
Krasnoyarsk Krai	784,337	60.16%	235,058	18.03%	109,827	8.42%	112,222	8.61%	46,123	3.54%	16,279	1.25%
Kurgan Oblast	305,777	63.39%	83,955	17.40%	27,725	5.75%	41,340	8.57%	19,280	3.99%	4,314	0.89%
Kursk Oblast	366,745	60.45%	122,775	20.24%	38,002	6.26%	49,744	8.20%	23,101	3.81%	6,350	1.05%
Leningrad Oblast	501,893	61.90%	114,951	14.18%	80,874	9.98%	54,857	6.77%	47,518	5.86%	10,664	1.32%
Lipetsk Oblast	382,179	60.99%	132,408	21.13%	34,778	5.55%	44,697	7.13%	24,722	3.95%	7,751	1.24%
Magadan Oblast	39,196	56.25%	13,946	20.01%	6,769	9.71%	6,399	9.18%	2,607	3.74%	769	1.10%
Mari El	228,612	59.98%	84,200	22.09%	24,282	6.37%	24,895	6.53%	15,175	3.98%	3,984	1.05%
Mordovia	506,415	87.06%	42,060	7.23%	9,353	1.61%	13,635	2.34%	6,448	1.11%	3,796	0.65%
Moscow	1,994,310	46.95%	814,573	19.18%	868,736	20.45%	267,418	6.30%	214,703	5.05%	87,698	2.06%
Moscow Oblast	2,015,379	56.85%	686,449	19.36%	396,379	11.18%	236,028	6.66%	149,801	4.23%	61,332	1.73%
Murmansk Oblast	244,579	60.05%	65,190	16.00%	39,291	9.65%	32,933	8.09%	20,566	5.05%	4,752	1.17%
Nenets Autonomous Okrug	13,346	57.05%	4,040	17.27%	2,349	10.04%	2,114	9.04%	1,239	5.30%	304	1.30%
Nizhny Novgorod Oblast	1,187,194	63.90%	353,964	19.05%	125,432	6.75%	110,808	5.96%	63,189	3.40%	17,366	0.93%
North Ossetia–Alania	289,643	70.06%	87,017	21.05%	6,848	1.66%	13,063	3.16%	12,864	3.11%	3,995	0.97%
Novgorod Oblast	179,501	57.91%	54,875	17.70%	27,017	8.72%	22,955	7.41%	22,066	7.12%	3,556	1.15%
Novosibirsk Oblast	762,126	56.34%	304,761	22.53%	124,205	9.18%	104,223	7.70%	41,001	3.03%	16,410	1.21%
Omsk Oblast	541,469	55.55%	234,035	24.01%	72,540	7.44%	74,857	7.68%	39,284	4.03%	12,644	1.30%
Orenburg Oblast	577,411	56.89%	252,947	24.92%	58,849	5.80%	74,414	7.33%	41,104	4.05%	10,212	1.01%
Oryol Oblast	237,868	52.84%	130,934	29.09%	27,632	6.14%	33,549	7.45%	15,066	3.35%	5,102	1.13%
Penza Oblast	492,031	64.27%	150,786	19.70%	39,908	5.21%	48,915	6.39%	24,213	3.16%	9,688	1.27%
Perm Krai	736,496	62.94%	184,639	15.78%	127,098	10.86%	53,879	4.60%	51,535	4.40%	16,562	1.42%
Primorsky Krai	567,177	57.31%	201,493	20.36%	78,639	7.95%	85,396	8.63%	43,168	4.36%	13,796	1.39%
Pskov Oblast	211,265	59.69%	73,073	20.64%	25,824	7.30%	23,760	6.71%	16,164	4.57%	3,880	1.10%
Rostov Oblast	1,324,042	62.66%	423,884	20.06%	134,461	6.36%	132,418	6.27%	76,633	3.63%	21,742	1.03%
Ryazan Oblast	370,945	59.74%	132,981	21.42%	37,903	6.10%	47,068	7.58%	25,562	4.12%	6,508	1.05%
Saint Petersburg	1,403,753	58.77%	311,937	13.06%	370,799	15.52%	110,979	4.65%	157,768	6.61%	33,331	1.40%
Sakha	317,933	69.46%	65,871	14.39%	29,712	6.49%	20,010	4.37%	20,193	4.41%	3,978	0.87%
Sakhalin Oblast	128,565	56.30%	45,730	20.03%	22,337	9.78%	20,016	8.77%	8,856	3.88%	2,846	1.25%
Samara Oblast	912,099	58.56%	320,128	20.55%	125,423	8.05%	117,828	7.56%	61,361	3.94%	20,828	1.34%
Saratov Oblast	934,685	70.64%	206,818	15.63%	59,006	4.46%	66,985	5.06%	43,267	3.27%	12,400	0.94%
Smolensk Oblast	273,232	56.69%	111,182	23.07%	32,516	6.75%	38,246	7.94%	20,930	4.34%	5,843	1.21%
Stavropol Krai	770,874	64.47%	215,600	18.03%	75,724	6.33%	83,543	6.99%	37,551	3.14%	12,448	1.04%
Sverdlovsk Oblast	1,337,781	64.50%	251,690	12.14%	237,780	11.46%	107,819	5.20%	113,353	5.47%	25,560	1.23%
Tambov Oblast	444,978	71.76%	107,797	17.38%	19,594	3.16%	28,179	4.54%	13,973	2.25%	5,570	0.90%
Tatarstan	1,967,291	82.70%	229,711	9.66%	69,708	2.93%	52,994	2.23%	41,878	1.76%	17,322	0.73%
Tomsk Oblast	261,581	57.07%	86,403	18.85%	53,028	11.57%	35,139	7.67%	16,966	3.70%	5,194	1.13%
Tula Oblast	587,952	67.77%	147,019	16.95%	43,917	5.06%	50,218	5.79%	29,601	3.41%	8,862	1.02%
Tuva	132,828	90.00%	6,370	4.32%	2,925	1.98%	2,574	1.74%	2,023	1.37%	860	0.58%
Tver Oblast	387,308	58.02%	131,591	19.71%	59,302	8.88%	49,384	7.40%	32,835	4.92%	7,076	1.06%
Tyumen Oblast	611,281	73.10%	95,398	11.41%	43,047	5.15%	59,083	7.07%	20,455	2.45%	6,915	0.83%
Udmurtia	515,755	65.75%	116,277	14.82%	67,362	8.59%	49,160	6.27%	26,803	3.42%	9,048	1.15%
Ulyanovsk Oblast	387,540	58.18%	160,089	24.03%	37,437	5.62%	46,384	6.96%	27,783	4.17%	6,926	1.04%
Vladimir Oblast	341,301	53.49%	132,400	20.75%	60,315	9.45%	53,615	8.40%	41,895	6.57%	8,484	1.33%
Volgograd Oblast	810,598	63.41%	240,998	18.85%	711,42	5.56%	87,657	6.86%	55,325	4.33%	12,696	0.99%
Vologda Oblast	361,720	59.44%	93,417	15.35%	57,064	9.38%	49,492	8.13%	40,306	6.62%	6,596	1.08%
Voronezh Oblast	800,024	61.34%	292,379	22.42%	69,813	5.35%	81,081	6.22%	47,974	3.68%	13,073	1.00%
Voting abroad	323,686	73.24%	31,785	7.19%	59,942	13.56%	12,006	2.72%	8,674	1.96%	5,838	1.32%
Yamalo-Nenets Autonomous Okrug	283,313	84.58%	18,738	5.59%	7,807	2.33%	17,456	5.21%	4,979	1.49%	2,669	0.80%
Yaroslavl Oblast	365,892	54.53%	133,476	19.89%	71,007	10.58%	51,816	7.72%	41,212	6.14%	7,569	1.13%
Zabaykalsky Krai	327,407	65.69%	71,636	14.37%	29,466	5.91%	49,612	9.95%	15,015	3.01%	5,271	1.06%
Russia	45,602,075	63.60%	12,318,353	17.18%	5,722,508	7.98%	4,458,103	6.22%	2,763,935	3.85%	836,691	1.17%

== Electoral irregularities ==
International observers from the Organization for Security and Co-operation in Europe (OSCE) found that although all competitors had access to the media, Putin was given clear prominence. Strict candidate registration requirements also limited "genuine competition". According to Tonino Picula, the Special Co-ordinator to lead the short-term OSCE observer mission,

There were serious problems from the very start of this election. The point of elections is that the outcome should be uncertain. This was not the case in Russia. There was no real competition and abuse of government resources ensured that the ultimate winner of the election was never in doubt.

The OSCE observers concluded that voting on the day of the election was assessed positively overall, but the "process deteriorated during the vote count which was assessed negatively in almost one-third of polling stations observed due to procedural irregularities." The OSCE called for a thorough investigation of the electoral violations and urged citizens to actively oversee future elections in order to increase confidence.

Allegations were made that Putin supporters had been driven around in coaches in order to vote for him in multiple constituencies (which is known as carousel voting). Vote stuffing was documented by video monitoring systems, which were installed on most voting stations.

The newspaper Pravda alleged that industrial plants with a continuous-cycle production have violated the law by bussing workers to polling centres. The chairman of the Moscow Election Committee Valentin Gorbunov countered the accusation saying that this was normal practice and did not constitute a violation. According to Iosif Diskin, a member of the Public Chamber of Russia, there were special observers who controlled that workers have legal absentee certificates. Information about carousel voting was, according to him, not confirmed. Georgy Fyodorov, director of the NGO "Citizens Watch" ("Гражданский контроль"), said that statements from the monitoring group GOLOS about carousel voting in Strogino District were false, however, Citizens Watch never addressed the evidence of the electoral fraud presented by GOLOS. The level of electoral manipulation is substantial. According to GOLOS, one third of all electoral commissions had substantial irregularities at the stage of vote counting and tabulation.

Claims that Putin's share of the vote was inflated by up to 10% were dismissed by Putin in a talk with journalists: "It's possible there were irregularities, probably there were some. But they can only influence hundredths of a per cent. Well, maybe one per cent; that I can imagine. But no more." Ruža Tomašić, OSCE observer from Croatia, noted that there were no irregularities at five polling stations near Kaluga.

The Communist Party of the Russian Federation did not acknowledge the results of the election.

== Protests ==
On 11 March 2012 approximately 15,000–20,000 protesters demonstrated in Novy Arbat street against perceived fraud and Putin's rule. MP Ilya Ponomaryov, a protest coordinator, described the protesters' plans: "We must be the government's constant nightmare and build up to a crescendo of protests at the time of Putin's inauguration in early May."

=== Inauguration ===
Putin was inaugurated in the Kremlin on 7 May 2012. Public protests had taken place in Moscow on 6 May with estimated 8,000-20,000 protesters taking part. 80 people were injured in confrontations with police (including over 30 policemen) and 450 arrests were made on 6 May and another 120 arrests the following day.

== Cost ==
The election cost 10.375 million roubles according to a report given by the Russian Central Election Commission. According to the report, during the campaign, budget funds have been spared.

== See also ==
- Bald–hairy
