= Ilia Shumanov =

Russian public figure and lawyer

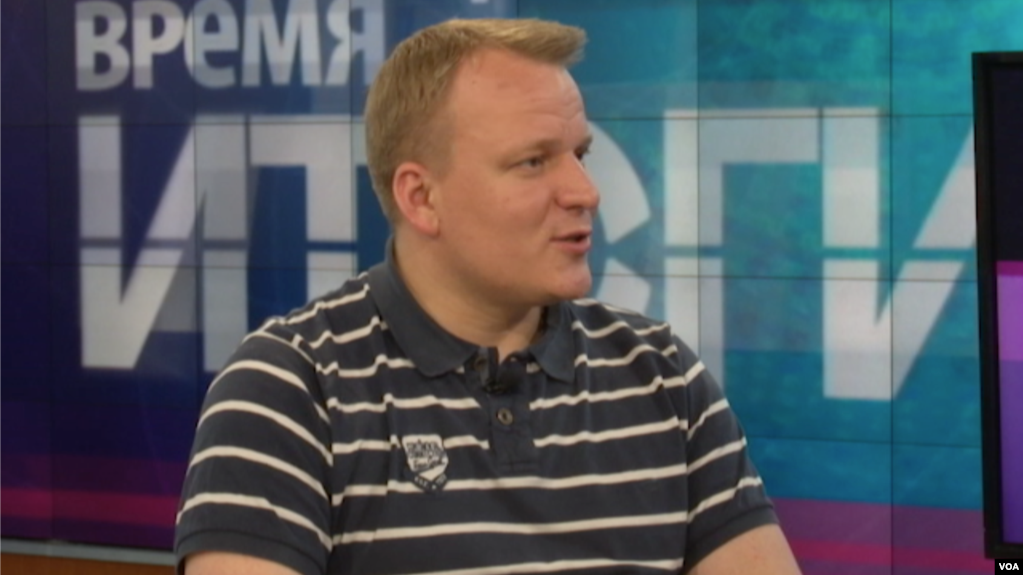
- Ilia Shumanov in 2016
- Born: Ilia Vyacheslavovich Shumanov; 21 June 1981 (age 45); USSR
- Occupation: Public figure
- Awards: Redkollegia (July 2022)

Ilia Shumanov (Russian: Илья Вячеславович Шуманов; born 21 June 1981) is a Russian public figure and lawyer. He served as the executive director of Transparency International Russia from 2021 until February 2025 and is the founder of the Arctida project.

== Biography ==
Ilia Shumanov was born in Voronezh, USSR. His mother worked as an engineer in the design of hydraulic structures, and his father was a professor at Kaliningrad State Technical University, where the family relocated shortly after his birth. Shumanov graduated in law from the Immanuel Kant Baltic Federal University in 2008 and from the Kaliningrad Law Institute of the Ministry of Internal Affairs of Russia in 2011.

After graduation, he initially worked in the gambling industry, co-founding a chain of gambling clubs and a strip club. Later, he transitioned to public service, where he became the chief specialist at the Kaliningrad mayor's office and subsequently headed the consumer market department.

In the early 2010s, Shumanov joined the Kaliningrad Regional Anti-Corruption Experts Society, a nonprofit organization, becoming a board member with a focus on corruption studies. In 2013, he began managing the Kaliningrad Office of Transparency International Russia and later advanced to the role of deputy director in 2016 and executive director in 2021. He stepped down from this position in February 2025.

From 2015 to 2018, Shumanov contributed materials to Forbes. He has also been featured as an expert in various media outlets, including Svobodnaya Pressa and Meduza. In 2012, he founded the Kafka and Orwell Forum, a discussion platform that has been held annually in Georgia since 2022.

Following the 2022 Russian invasion of Ukraine, Shumanov left Russia and founded Arctida, a project that focuses on Russian policies in the Arctic region and related issues.

== Persecution ==
In 2015, the Russian Ministry of Justice declared Transparency International – Russia a foreign agent. On 21 October 2022, Shumanov was also listed as a foreign agent. In July 2023, Shumanov was fined 100,000 rubles by the Moscow Presnensky Court for failing to label his work as that of a foreign agent.

On 6 March 2023, the Russian Prosecutor General's Office designated Transparency International, a Germany-based organization, as an undesirable organization, putting its staff at risk of criminal prosecution. Although Transparency International Russia was an autonomous organization, its board announced the liquidation of its legal entity on 16 March 2023 due to these legal risks. In September 2023, the Ministry of Justice removed the dissolved organization from the list of foreign agents.

On 24 August 2024, it was reported that Shumanov had been placed on Russia's federal wanted list for evading his foreign agent obligations.

== Awards ==
In June 2022, Shumanov's anti-corruption investigation "Steal and Inflate" was awarded the Redkollegia journalism award.
