= Boris Kovalchuk =

Russian official (born 1977)

- Борис Ковальчук
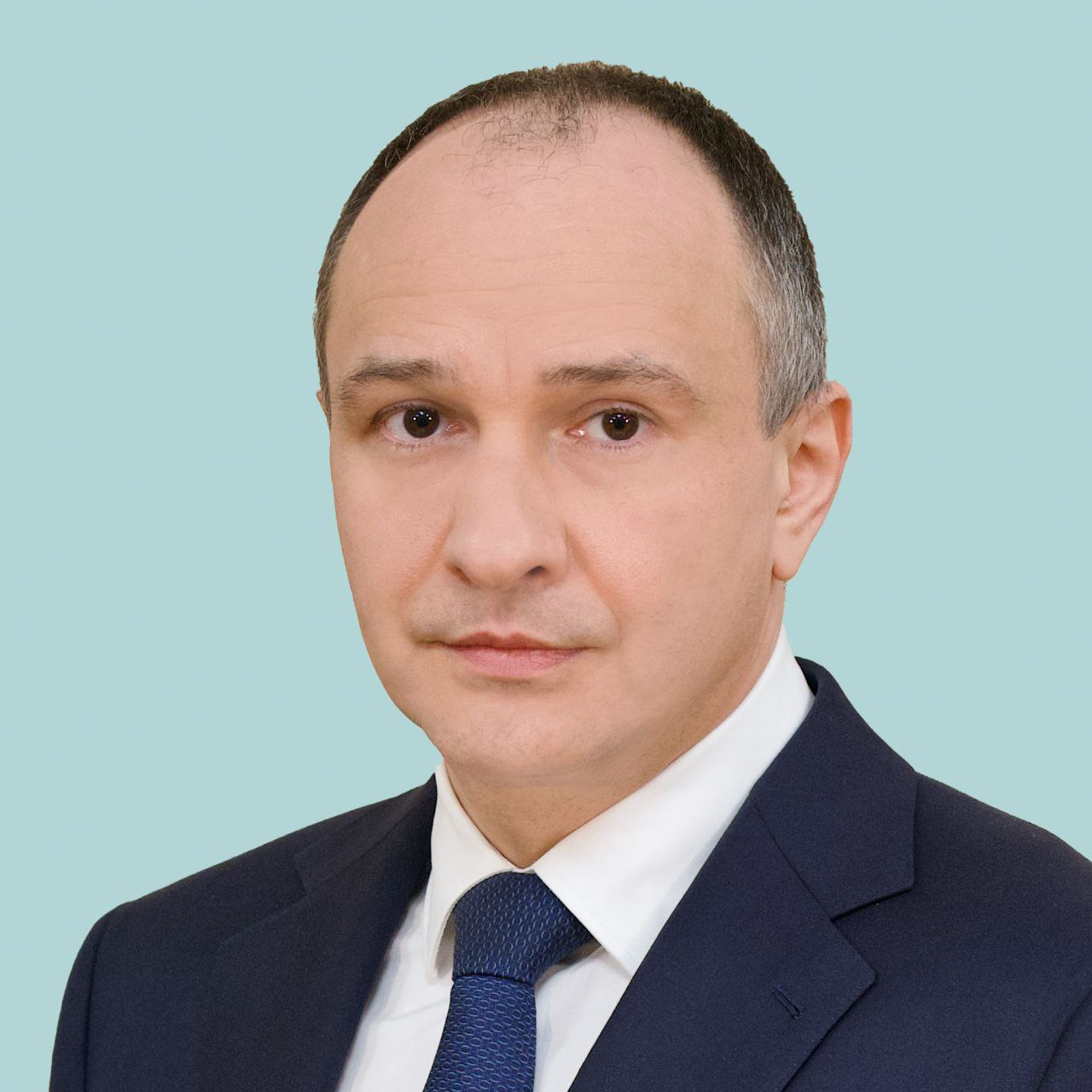
- Kovalchuk in 2024

5th Chairman of the Accounts Chamber
- Incumbent
- Assumed office 14 May 2024
- Preceded by: Alexei Kudrin; Galina Izotova (acting)

Personal details
- Born: 1 December 1977 (age 48) Leningrad, Russian SFSR, Soviet Union (now Saint Petersburg, Russia)
- Parent: Yury Kovalchuk
- Education: Saint Petersburg State University Faculty of Law

Boris Yuryevich Kovalchuk (Russian: Бори́с Ю́рьевич Ковальчу́к; born 1 December 1977) is a Russian official who has served as Chairman of the Accounts Chamber of Russia since 2024. He is a son of Yury Kovalchuk.

Since April 20, 2006, he has led the Department of the Russian Government's Staff for implementation of the National Priority Projects.

== Biography ==
Kovalchuk was born on December 1, 1977, in Leningrad, which was then part of the Russian SFSR. His father is Yury Kovalchuk, who has been known to be a longtime associate of Vladimir Putin. In 1999 he graduated from the Faculty of Law of St. Petersburg State University. After graduating he worked until 2006 as a legal consultant at the Federal State Unitary Enterprise Central Research Institute "Granit", which supplies telecommunications equipments while also from 2003 to 2006 being a member of the audit commission of the Rossiya Bank which his father owns. In addition, during this time, he was executive director of the non-profit "League of Honorary Consuls", director of the North-West Consulting Company, head of Consult LLC, and head of the management company "Investment Culture" which built ski resorts in Leningrad region.

On March 9, 2006, he was appointed assistant in the secretariat of then First Deputy Prime Minister of Russia, Dmitry Medvedev. In November 2009 he was appointed Acting Chairman of the Management Board of Inter RAO, after Yevgeny Dod went to the board of RusHydro. In the summer of 2010 he was approved as the full-time chairman of Inter RAO, which he did until March 2024.

== Sanctions ==
He was sanctioned by the UK government in 2022 in relation to the Russo-Ukrainian War.

In December 2022 the EU sanctioned Boris Kovalchuk in relation to the 2022 Russian invasion of Ukraine.
