= Carousel voting =

Method of vote rigging

Carousel voting (in Russian карусель (karusel, "carousel")) is a method of vote rigging in elections, used particularly in Russia and Serbia, whereby "busloads of voters [are] driven around to cast ballots multiple times". The term "carousel" refers to the circular movement made by the voters, from one polling station to the next, alluding to fairground carousels. Similar practice was reported in Serbia during the 2023 and 2024 local elections when thousands of voters were bussed from one municipality to another (or from Republika Srpska to Serbia), so to vote in municipalities where they do not live.

== In Russia ==
The activity has been used in Russia since Vladimir Putin came to power in 2000. Voters are recruited through offers of payment and then meet up on the day of the election and are instructed by a leader as to what to do. Journalist Sergei Smirnov reported in 2012 that he was offered 2,000 roubles ($70) to vote four times for Putin in the presidential election. He was told to photograph the ballot papers and then send the photographs to his group leader. Smirnov also reported meeting people who said that they had been paid 5,000 roubles ($170) to vote in the previous year's parliamentary elections.

Who orders the carousels is not completely established. The Just Russia's member of State Duma Ilya Ponomarev has said that the fraud in Russia's electoral system has been created due to the initiative of local officials who wish to please their superiors: "Vladimir Putin has a system in place in which provincial authorities are obliged to hold up the result of the ruling party. They know that if they don't attain the right result they could lose their jobs".

== In Ukraine ==
Carousel voting was one of several election fraud methods used by the Viktor Yanukovych campaign in the 2004 presidential election in Ukraine, which led to the mass protests known as the Orange Revolution, and to Ukraine's Constitutional Court decision to nullify election results and order a new election, which was won by Viktor Yushchenko.

Cases of carousel voting have also been reported during the 2012 Ukrainian parliamentary election.

== In Azerbaijan ==
Independent observers reported instances of carousel voting during the 2020 Azerbaijani parliamentary election.

== In Serbia ==
During the 2023 Belgrade City Assembly election (part of the 2023 Serbian local elections), media reported that thousands of Serbian citizens who do not reside in Belgrade (mostly Serbs from Republika Srpska) were bussed to Belgrade by the ruling Serbian Progressive Party (SNS) to vote. N1 television published videos of busloads of "voters" in front of the Belgrade Arena, which was used as a gathering point. From there, those "phantom voters" were sent to different polling stations around the city to cast their votes. According to Miodrag Jovanović, professor of the University of Belgrade Faculty of Law, this was illegal, as people who do not reside in Belgrade do not have right to vote in the local election. Milan Stamatović of the ruling SNS coalition, claimed that bussing non-resident voters is legitimate and legal. Many other leaders of the SNS including Aleksandar Vučić, president of Serbia, acknowledged and defended bussing phantom voters as legitimate. Independent observers called the election "rigged", as did Freedom House. Office for Democratic Institutions and Human Rights and European Union expressed concern regarding the legality of the election process. Higher Public Prosecutor of Belgrade rejected all criminal charges claiming that there is no evidence of illegal acts.

During the 2024 Belgrade City Assembly election, it was again reported that residents of different Serbian towns were bussed to Belgrade to cast their vote. Especially notable was the case of a group of Mala Krsna residents whose street was asphalted only after they accepted to be taken to Belgrade to vote. Residents of other towns were also bussed to Belgrade to vote, including Kovin and Vranje.

== In Georgia ==
President Salome Zourabichvili claimed before the 2024 Georgian parliamentary election, ID card were confiscated from socially disadvantaged persons under various pretexts and then used by the ruling Georgian Dream to vote on electronic devices up to 17 times and called this "Russian methods" and "Armenian Carousel".

== See also ==
- Bulgarian train
