= Declarator (website) =

The Deсlarator
- Декларатор
- Founded at: Russia
- Type: Nonprofit organization
- Location: Russia
- Website: https://declarator.org/

The Declarator (Russian: Декларатор) is a russian online service for processing anti-corruption declarations of officials. As of 2025, the service contains records of more than 1.3 million public officials.

== Project background and development ==
Declarator was created in 2011 with the aim of increasing the transparency and accessibility of information on the income and property of Russian officials. The project was a response to the introduction in Russia in 2008 of mandatory income and property declarations for civil servants. Initially, the project team was engaged in manually collating data from declarations into spreadsheets. However, this approach was not efficient enough to process large volumes of information. This led to the decision to develop a specialized database and a website for publishing the collected information.

In 2013 to 2014, the project received support from the Civil Initiatives Committee of Russia, thanks to which declarations from a number of federal and regional authorities were processed and the technical base of the Declarator was improved. A significant contribution to the development of the project was made by the HSE Project and Training Laboratory of Anti-Corruption Policy, whose students and interns participated in the creation of the database architecture and information processing.

In 2018, an API was launched that allows third-party projects to access and use the Declarator database.

The key figure and speaker of the project is Andrey Zhvirblis. He stood at the origins of the database creation and has been coordinating the team's work since its launch.

== Project goals and objectives ==
The Declarator project aims to increase transparency and public control over the income and property of officials in Russia. The main task is to collect disparate information about the income, assets and property liabilities of officials at all levels (from the school principal to the president) and present it in a convenient, machine-readable format.

Careful examination of financial declarations of public officials allows journalists, activists and citizens to identify potential conflicts of interest, illicit enrichment or discrepancies between declared income and assets.

== Practical application ==
The publication Important Stories has studied how civil servants receive real estate from the state, while many veterans are forced to wait for housing for years. The investigation indicates that some officials have purchased several apartments under preferential programs.

The Anti-Corruption Foundation (FBK) used the Declarator data to search for declarations of officials, which became the basis for a number of anti-corruption investigations, including into the ownership of elite real estate by government officials.

Russia Post analyzed in a study how access to data on the incomes of officials in Russia has changed, citing the Declarator service.

== Scientific research ==
An analysis of government employee declarations using the Declarator was used in a study published in the American Journal of Political Science.

== Restrictions and legislative changes ==
Public access to some information is restricted by Russian law. Since the adoption of the Law on Combating Corruption in 2008 has undergone multiple revisions, some of which have significantly reduced the volume of open data.

- In 2022, a ban was introduced on the publication of declarations of employees of a number of government agencies during the Russian invasion of Ukraine.
- In 2023, a law was passed allowing deputies and senators not to publish income declarations, and also allowing municipal deputies not to submit declarations under certain conditions.

The Federal Protective Service also restricts access to a number of data on high-ranking officials. Some agencies publish declarations in formats that are difficult to process automatically or delete archived information, which reduces the completeness and openness of information.

In June 2025, the website of the Declarator project was blocked by Roskomnadzor following a court ruling in response to a complaint from the prosecutor's office regarding violations of personal data legislation.
