= Accounts Chamber of Russia =

Parliamentary body of financial control in the Russian Federation

- Emblem

- Digital emblem

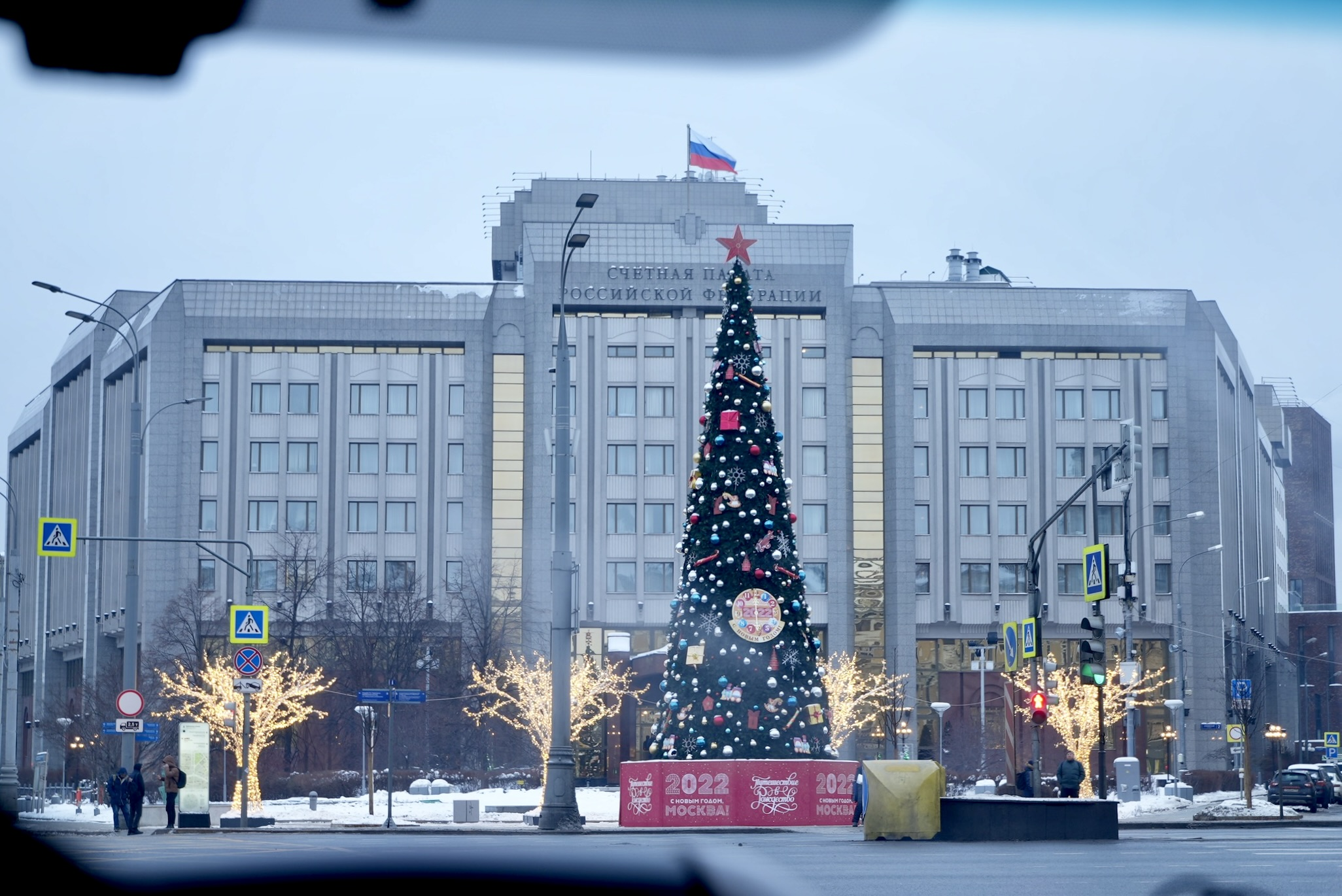
- Headquarters at 15 Zubovskaya Street, 2022

Agency overview
- Formed: 14 January 1995
- Headquarters: Zubovsksya Street 15, Moscow
- Agency executives: Boris Kovalchuk, Chairman; Galina Izotova, Deputy Chairwoman
- Website: ach.gov.ru

Accounts Chamber of the Russian Federation (Russian: Счётная палата Российской Федерации) is the parliamentary body of financial control in the Russian Federation.

== History ==
The prototype of the Accounts Chamber of the Russian Federation was the Chamber-collegium established by Peter I in 1718 for the management of state taxes and some sectors of the state economy. Prior to that time, the treasury of Russian tsars was a mess. The founder of the Court of Auditors was Petr Lukich Aksenov. In 1719, he introduced to the Russian government the written balance of income and expenditure of money in the state treasury, and gave the Emperor a weekly report of capital flows. Moreover, Petr Aksenov defined the form of accounting for the Chambers-collegium and teach it local clerk and officials from all Russia. In 1725, the Senate determined Peter Aksenov kamerirom, and in 1731 Secretary.

The office of State Comptroller existed in the Russian Empire from 1811 to 1918. It was then replaced by People's Commissariat of same name and in 1920 by Rabkrin.

== Status ==
Status of the Accounting Chamber of the Russian Federation by the Constitution of Russia and the Federal Law "On the Accounts Chamber of the Russian Federation", according to which the Accounts Chamber of the Russian Federation is a permanent body of financial control, which is formed by the Federal Assembly, the bicameral parliament of Russia and accountable to him. The work of The Chamber is guided by federal law, carries out the assignments of the Federation Council and the State Duma. As part of its objectives Chamber has the organizational and functional independence. It is the supervisory body of the Federal Assembly, but is not a structural unit and formally applies to the legislative, executive or judicial branches of government.

== Structure ==
Chairman and half of (six auditors) Accounts shall be appointed by the State Duma, Vice-President and the other half of (six auditors) - Council of the Federation. Audit Chamber composed of a body and the unit. Board considers the organization of work, as well as reports and messages. Chairman (or in his absence - his deputy) manages the Accounting Chamber, organizes its work, auditors led by certain activities. The apparatus consists of the inspectors (who directly organize and carry out control) and other staff members.

Internal matters of the Chamber, the distribution of responsibilities between auditors Court of Auditors, the Apparatus of the Accounts Chamber of Russia and the interaction of the structural units of the Accounting Chamber, the order of business, development and implementation activities of all kinds and forms of control, and other activities are regulated by the Accounting Chamber, approved by its Board.

== Chairs ==
№	Chair	Took office	Left office	Length of service	Deputy Chair
1	Khachim Karmokov	17 January 1994	19 April 2000	6 years, 93 days	Yury Boldyrev (1995–2001)
2	Sergei Stepashin	19 April 2000	20 September 2013	13 years, 154 days	Yury Boldyrev (1995–2001)
2	Sergei Stepashin	19 April 2000	20 September 2013	13 years, 154 days	Alexander Semikolennykh (2001–2010)
2	Sergei Stepashin	19 April 2000	20 September 2013	13 years, 154 days	Valery Goreglyad (2010–2013)
3	Tatyana Golikova	20 September 2013	17 May 2018	4 years, 239 days	Vera Chistova (2013–2019)
Vera Chistova as acting chairwoman (17 — 22 May 2018)					Vera Chistova (2013–2019)
4	Alexei Kudrin	22 May 2018	30 November 2022	4 years, 192 days	Vera Chistova (2013–2019)
4	Alexei Kudrin	22 May 2018	30 November 2022	4 years, 192 days	Galina Izotova (2019–present)
Galina Izotova as acting chairwoman (30 November 2022 — 14 May 2024)					Galina Izotova (2019–present)
5	Boris Kovalchuk	14 May 2024	Incumbent	2 years, 86 days	Galina Izotova (2019–present)

== See also ==
- Federal budget of Russia
