= Opinion polling for the 2012 Russian presidential election =

Opinion polling for the Russian presidential election, 2012

This is a collection of scientific, public opinion polls that have been conducted relating to the 2012 Russian presidential election.

== Election forecasts ==
Poll source	Date					
Poll source	Date	Putin UR	Zyuganov CPRF	Zhirinovsky LDPR	Prokhorov Ind	Mironov SR
Levada	16–20 Dec 2011	39	26	8	4	6
Levada	20–23 Jan 2011	54	27	5	2	1
FOM	21–22 Jan 2012	52.2	18.0	10.8	6.7	6.6
FOM	28–29 Jan 2012	52.6	28.9	3.7	2.9	2.9
FOM	4–5 Feb 2012	58.7	15.0	12.2	7.2	5.1
FOM	11–12 Feb 2012	35.0	54.7	2.5	1.4	4.0
VCIOM	11–12 Feb 2012	58.6	14.8	9.4	8.7	7.7
Levada	17–20 Feb 2012	52	24	3	2	1
FOM	18–19 Feb 2012	58.7	16.2	8.8	8.6	6.1
VCIOM	25–26 Feb 2012	51.9	25.1	7.7	3.7	2.1

== Open survey ==
Polling firm	Fieldwork date	Sample size	Putin UR	Medvedev UR	Zyuganov CPRF	Prokhorov Ind	Zhirinovsky LDPR	Mironov SR	Yavlinsky Yabloko	Mezentsev UR	Other	Wouldn't vote	Spoil	Undecided
Levada	21–24 Jan 2011	1,600	23	19	5	—	3	—	—	—	4	11	—	37
Levada	11–14 Feb 2011	1,600	22	19	6	—	4	0	—	—	4	12	3	33
Levada	18–21 Mar 2011	1,600	22	19	6	—	4	0	—	—	3	13	4	31
Levada	15–18 Apr 2011	1,600	25	20	5	—	4	0	—	—	3	9	—	35
Levada	13–16 May 2011	1,600	24	21	6	—	4	1	—	—	3	12	—	31
Levada	23–27 Jun 2011	1,600	23	18	6	0	5	1	—	—	4	12	—	33
Levada	15–19 Jul 2011	1,600	23	18	5	1	4	1	—	—	3	12	—	35
Levada	19–23 Aug 2011	1,600	23	16	5	—	4	1	—	—	4	10	—	41
Levada	23–27 Sep 2011	1,600	27	13	6	—	5	—	—	—	3	11	—	34
Levada	30 Sep–3 Oct 2011	1,591	42	6	10	—	9	—	—	—	3	17	—	8
Levada	21–24 Oct 2011	1,600	34	9	6	1	5	1	—	—	4	11	—	34
FOM	6 Nov 2011	3,000	46	—	9	—	9	3	—	—	3	11	1	13
FOM	13 Nov 2011	3,000	42	—	11	—	11	3	—	—	3	12	1	14
FOM	20 Nov 2011	3,000	42	—	10	—	11	4	—	—	3	12	2	14
Levada	18–21 Nov 2011	1,591	31	7	8	—	6	—	—	—	—	12	—	33
FOM	27 Nov 2011	3,000	41	—	10	—	11	4	—	—	2	11	1	15
FOM	30 Nov 2011	3,000	45	—	10	—	12	6	—	—	1	9	1	12
FOM	11 Dec 2011	3,000	42	—	10	—	11	4	—	—	3	11	1	13
FOM	18 Dec 2011	3,000	43	—	10	—	10	5	—	—	4	11	1	13
VCIOM	24 Dec 2011	1,600	45	—	10	4	8	5	2	—	—	10	—	12
FOM	24–25 Dec 2011	3,000	44	—	12	4	11	4	2	—	2	9	1	12
VCIOM	7 Jan 2012	1,600	48	—	10	3	9	5	2	0	—	9	—	10
VCIOM	14 Jan 2012	1,600	52	—	11	2	9	4	1	0	0	10	—	9
FOM	14–15 Jan 2012	3,000	45	—	11	3	10	3	1	—	1	10	1	13
VCIOM	21 Jan 2012	1,600	49	—	8	4	9	6	—	—	—	9	—	9
FOM	22 Jan 2012	3,000	44	—	11	4	9	4	2	—	1	11	1	13
Levada	20–23 Jan 2012	1,600	37	<1	8	4	5	4	—	—	1	14	—	26
VCIOM	28 Jan 2012	1,600	52		9	4	8	4	—	—	—	11	—	10
VCIOM	5 Feb 2012	1,600	53.3	—	10.3	4.6	8.2	3.3	—	—	—	9.8	—	9.8
VCIOM	12 Feb 2012	1,600	54.7	—	9.2	5.8	8.0	5.0	—	—	—	8.1	—	8.4
VCIOM	19 Feb 2012	1,600	53.5	—	10.8	5.6	8.9	4.3	—	—	—	7.8	—	8.0
Levada	24–27 Feb 2012	1,600	46	—	12	5	8	4	—	—	0	11	1	15

According to a "Levada Center" opinion poll from September 2011, 41% of Russian people wanted to see Putin be a candidate in the 2012 elections as opposed to 22% for Medvedev, while 10% wanted someone else and 28% were unsure.

== Exit polls ==
Candidate	%	
Vladimir Putin	59.3%	58.3%
Mikhail Prokhorov	9.6%	9.2%
Gennady Zyuganov	18.2%	17.7%
Vladimir Zhirinovsky	7.4%	8.5%
Sergey Mironov	4.3%	4.8%
Spoiled ballot		1.5%
Refused to answer		31.7%
Sample Size		159,161
Poll Source	FOM	VTSIOM
