= Elena Panfilova =

Russian academic and anti-corrpution activist

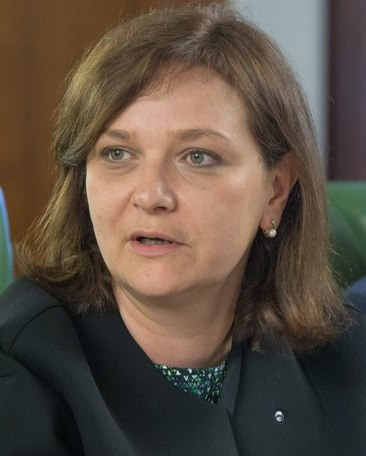
Elena Panfilova, April 2015 (cropped)

Elena A. Panfilova is chairperson of the Center for Anti-corruption Research and Initiative, former board chair of Transparency International Russia, and a former vice chair of Transparency International globally. She founded the Transparency International chapter in Russia in 1999.

Panfilova was previously a professor in the Higher School of Economics and is presently a professor in the graduate business school of Lomonosov Moscow State University. She lectures on business ethics and anti-corruption. Panfilova was also a lecturer on anti-corruption for the Council of Europe. Her husband, Alexander Panfilov, is a translator.
