= Mikhail Prokhorov 2012 presidential campaign =

Russian presidential campaign

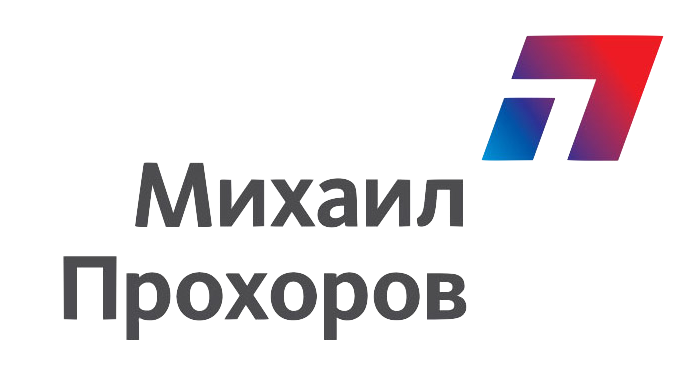
- Campaign: 2012 Russian presidential election
- Candidate: Mikhail Prokhorov businessman and former leader of Right Cause
- Affiliation: Independent
- Key people: Anton Krasovsky (campaign manager)

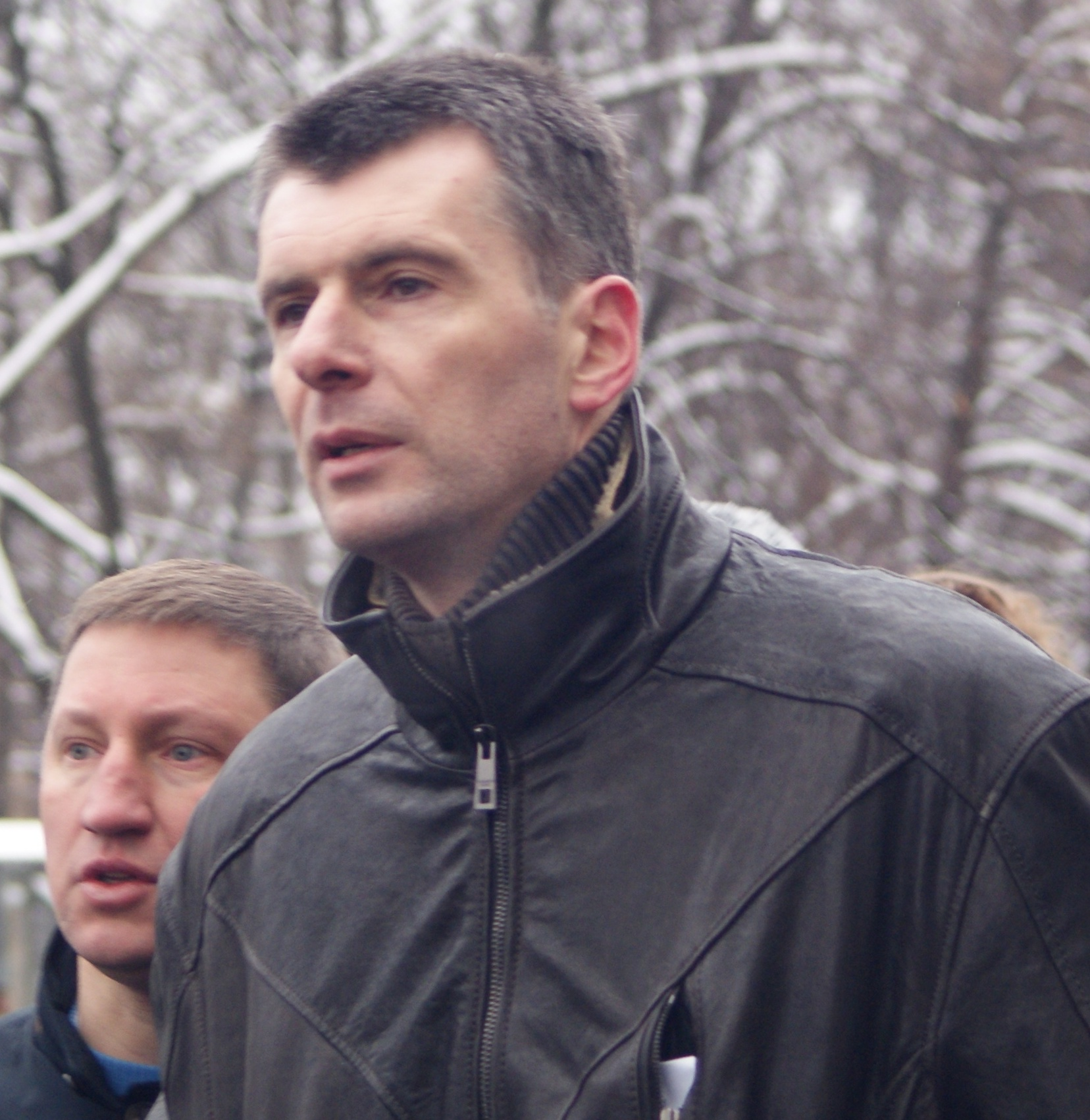
Prokhorov campaigning

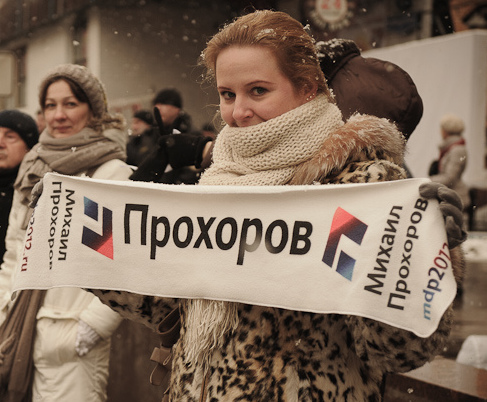
A campaign supporter

The Mikhail Prokhorov 2012 presidential campaign was the 2012 campaign of businessman Mikhail Prokhorov for the Russian presidency.

Prokhorov campaigned as an independent politician.

== Campaign ==
In December 2011, after the legislative elections, Prokhorov announced that he would contest the 2012 presidential election against Vladimir Putin as an independent. He called it at the time "probably the most important decision of my life". According to Communist leader Gennady Zyuganov and opposition leader Boris Nemtsov, both believed the move was inspired by the Kremlin itself. According to Mr. Nemtsov, Prokhrov's candidacy is an attempt, "to preserve Putin's regime". He collected the 2 million signatures needed to allow him to run for the presidency.

In the 4 March 2012 presidential polls, Prokhorov gained 7.94% of the vote.

Mikhail Prokhorov conducted a tour around the country, meeting with his supporters in various cities. He was the only candidate to do so except for Putin, who visited Russia's regions as a part of his Prime Minister of Russia duties.

During his campaign, Prokhorov largely refrained from speaking negatively about his opponents. Prokhorov stated that he would not base his campaign on criticism of Putin. "Criticism must make up no more than 10% ... I would like to focus on the things I would do," he said.

Officially, Phrokhorov was the second best-funded campaign of the election, with a campaign fund of 400 million rubles (only 11 million rubles shy of Putin), of which he spent more than 319 million.

== Campaign promises and views ==
Prokhorov positioned himself as a liberal reformist.

While running for president in 2012, he made a number of promises if he was to be elected. For domestic policy, Prokhorov promised to build more roads and railroad tracks, and increase the Russian standard of living to the point of being higher than in the United States.

As for foreign policy, his view was that Russia should create a closer partnership for trade with the European Union and a closer partnership with the Central Asian zone. He sought greater integration with Europe. Undesirable countries in his opinion are the "non-democratic" or human-rights- abusing regimes, of which he named Iran and Syria as the primary ones.

If elected, Prokhorov promised to reinstate elections for Russia's governorships.

Prokhorov promised to pardon Mikhail Khodorkovsky.

Prokhorov promised to reverse the recent constitutional amendment that had lengthened presidential terms from four years to six.

Prokhorov stated that it was his belief that the Prime Minister and parliament needed to be a strong counterweight to the presidency. He stated that he would select Alexei Kudrin to serve as his prime minister.

Prokhorov promised to dismantle state control of the media and prohibit all forms of censorship and state control of major television and radio stations. This included selling-off state-owned television assets.

Prokhorov would require the government's top 200 officials to sell off their business assets. Speaking of his own business interests he stated, “When I become president, I will sell all my assets, I will pay all the taxes, and I will give more than a half to charity.”

Prokhorov promised to dismantle large energy monopolies, including Gazprom. He also stated that he favored better relations with the European Union.

He planned to, whether or not he won the presidency, lead a liberal free-market oriented party following the presidential election. In June 2012 he became the leader of the Civic Platform Party.

Mikhail Prokhorov’s results in the 2012 Russian presidential election
