= Joseph Raihelgauz =

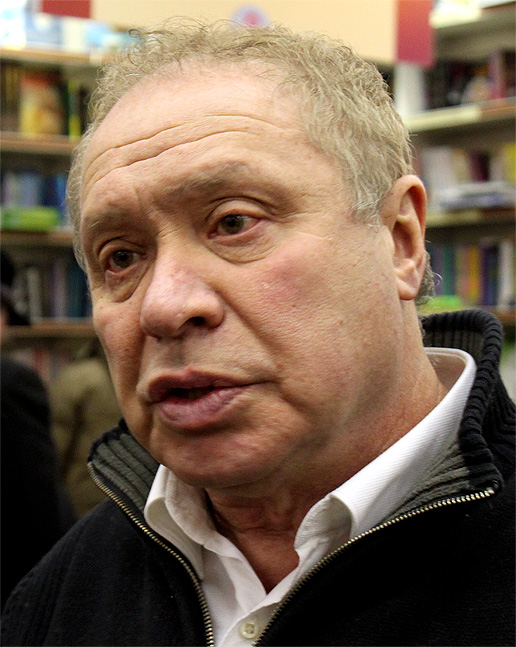

Joseph Leonidovich Raihelgauz (Reichelhaus) (Russian: Ио́сиф Леони́дович Райхельгауз; born June 12, 1947, Odessa) is a Soviet and Russian theater director, teacher; People's Artist of Russia (1999), professor of the Russian University of Theatre Arts (GITIS), founder and artistic director of the Moscow theater School of Modern Drama. Member of the Public Council of the Russian Jewish Congress.

In 2012, he signed an open letter calling for the release of the participating group Pussy Riot.
