= Alexei Kudrin =

Russian liberal politician and economist (born 1960)

- Алексей Кудрин
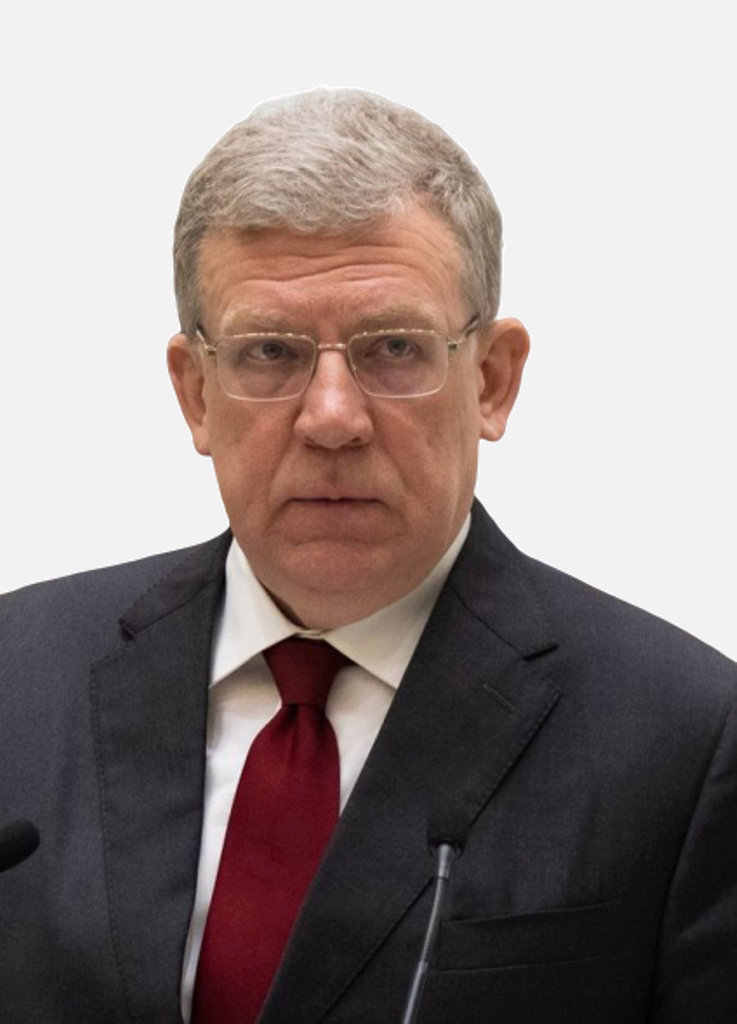
- Kudrin in 2020

4th Chairman of the Accounts Chamber
- In office 22 May 2018 – 30 November 2022
- Preceded by: Tatyana Golikova
- Succeeded by: Galina Izotova (acting); Boris Kovalchuk

Minister of Finance
- In office 18 May 2000 – 26 September 2011
- Prime Minister: Mikhail Kasyanov; Viktor Khristenko (acting); Mikhail Fradkov; Viktor Zubkov; Vladimir Putin
- Preceded by: Mikhail Kasyanov
- Succeeded by: Anton Siluanov

Deputy Prime Minister of Russia
- In office 18 May 2000 – 9 March 2004; 24 September 2007 – 26 September 2011

Personal details
- Born: 12 October 1960 (age 66) Dobele, Latvian SSR, Soviet Union (now Latvia)
- Party: Independent
- Other political affiliations: Civil Initiatives Committee (2012–)
- Education: Leningrad State University; Russian Academy of Sciences

Alexei Leonidovich Kudrin (Russian: Алексе́й Леони́дович Ку́дрин, IPA: [ɐlʲɪkˈsʲej lʲɪɐˈnʲidəvʲɪtɕ ˈkudrʲɪn]; born 12 October 1960) is a Russian liberal politician and economist. Previously he served as the Chairman of the Accounts Chamber from 2018 to 2022 and as Minister of Finance from 2000 to 2011. Since 9 December 2022, he has been a corporate development advisor at Yandex.

After graduating with degrees in finance and economics, Kudrin worked in the administration of Saint Petersburg's liberal Mayor Anatoly Sobchak. In 1996, he started working in the Presidential Administration of Boris Yeltsin. He was appointed as Finance Minister on 28 May 2000 and held the post for 11 years, making him the longest-serving Finance Minister in post-Soviet Russia up to that point. In addition, he was Deputy Prime Minister from 2000 to 2004 and again beginning in 2007. As Finance Minister, Kudrin was widely credited with prudent fiscal management, commitment to tax and budget reform and championing the free market.

Under Kudrin, Russia's government paid most of the substantial foreign debt it had accumulated in the 1990s, leaving the country with one of the lowest foreign debts among major economies. Much of the revenue from exports was accumulated at the Stabilization Fund which helped Russia to come out of the 2008 financial crisis in a much better state than many experts expected. During his career, Kudrin has won several awards, including the "Finance Minister of the Year 2010" prize from Euromoney magazine. He was asked to resign from his position on 26 September 2011 by President Dmitry Medvedev.

From 2011 to 2022, he was the dean of the Faculty of Liberal Arts and Sciences in St. Petersburg State University. As of 2016, he is co-chairman of the board of trustees of the Mariinsky Theatre,^{[25]} and the chairman of the board of trustees of the foundation of the European University at St. Petersburg.^{[26]}

He has the federal state civilian service rank of 1st class Active State Councillor of the Russian Federation.

== Biography ==
=== Early life and education ===
Alexei Kudrin was born on 12 October 1960 in Dobele, Latvian SSR to Russian father and Latvian mother. His first job was a motor mechanic and training assistant at the engine laboratory of the Academy of Procurement and Transportation of the Defense Ministry of the Soviet Union, before entering Leningrad State University to study economy. He graduated in 1983, and got an internship at the Leningrad Institute of Social and Economic Problems. In December 1985, he entered the internal postgraduate school at the Institute of Economics of the Academy of Sciences of the Soviet Union, where he later received his PhD. He then worked as a researcher at the Institute of Social and Economic Problems of the Academy of Sciences. Kudrin has authored over 15 scientific works in the fields economics and finance, including topics such as competition and anti-monopoly policy in the Soviet economy of the transition period.

=== Saint Petersburg administration ===
From 1990 to 1996, Kudrin worked in the Saint Petersburg Saint Petersburg City Administration under the liberal mayor and reformer Anatoly Sobchak. His first position was vice chairman of the Committee for Economic Reform. Until 1993, he worked in various financial positions in the city administration, before he was promoted to deputy mayor, in which position he served from 1993 to 1996. Future president Vladimir Putin was the other top deputy mayor of Saint Petersburg at the time. Kudrin was also chairman of the City Administration's Economic and Finance Committee.

=== Presidential administration ===
In August 1996, Kudrin was appointed deputy chief of Boris Yeltsin's presidential administration, as well as chief of the Administration on Trade, Economic and Scientific-Technological Cooperation. In March 1997, he became first deputy finance minister, and on 28 May 2000, he was appointed finance minister by the new president Vladimir Putin. In addition to his role as finance minister, Kudrin served as one of the deputy prime ministers of Russia from 2000 to 2004 and again beginning in September 2007.

== Finance minister ==
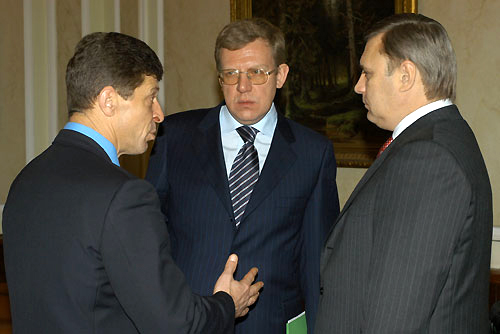
Dmitry Kozak, Alexei Kudrin and Mikhail Kasyanov in 2003

Kudrin served as finance minister from May 2000 to September 2011. Kudrin belongs to the group of so-called "St Petersburg economists"—liberal reformers who worked with Putin during his time in the St Petersburg administration—one of the three main informal groups during Putin's presidency. John P. Willerton regards Kudrin and Herman Gref as the leading intellectual forces in crafting of the economic policies of the Putin and Medvedev presidencies. According to Simon Pirani, Kudrin balanced the influence of the siloviki in the government with a financial sobriety.

=== Prudent fiscal management ===
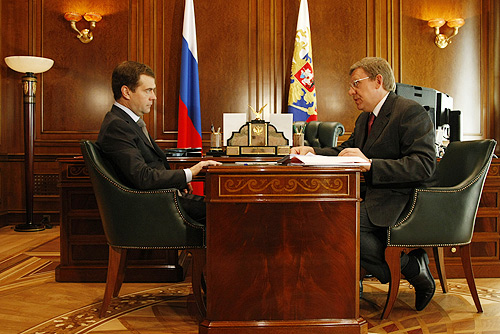
Kudrin meeting with President Dmitry Medvedev on 27 May 2008

During Putin's presidency, Russia's macroeconomic policies were highly prudent, and extra income from oil exports was put in stabilization funds. The Stabilization Fund of the Russian Federation is widely regarded as Kudrin's idea. Alexander Osin, chief economist at Finam Management, regards the Stabilization Fund as one of Kudrin's main achievements. However, other analysts have described The Stabilization Fund as "dead money", which doesn't benefit the real economy. The Stabilization Fund was split into the Reserve Fund and National Welfare Fund in February 2008.

In 2005, Kudrin and Prime Minister Mikhail Fradkov clashed over a proposal to cut VAT tax from 18% to 13%. Fradkov supported the proposal, but Kudrin argued that lower VAT could endanger stability of the ruble and would cause the government to withdraw money from the stabilization fund. The same year, Kudrin received the "Finance Minister of the Year 2005" award by the Banker magazine.

On 21 August 2006, Russia paid its debts, totalling $23.7 billion to the Paris Club. Simon Pirani, writing for Emerging Markets, praised Kudrin's refusal to be "blown off course by other ministers' whims" in his quest to repay the debt. He also credited Kudrin with sound conduct of the ruble exchange rate and capable fiscal management that has arguably helped to prevent the most serious problems of the so-called Dutch disease. In 2006, Kudrin received the award "Best Finance Minister of a Developing European Country" by the Emerging Markets newspaper, published by the IMF and the World Bank.

As the father and supporter of the prudent fiscal management policies, Kudrin had to endure strong criticism from other members of the government, who believed the money should instead be invested in the country's development. In the end, Kudrin's stance prevailed. The savings later proved crucial in helping Russia to come out of the 2008 financial crisis in a much better state than many experts had expected, and Kudrin was widely credited for his policies.

Still, the Putin-Kudrin relationship was not all smooth sailing. For example, in September 2007 Kudrin was almost fired but in the end was kept on in Viktor Zubkov's Cabinet.

Early in the Putin years, Kudrin was appointed chair of the state-owned diamond concern, Alrosa.

=== Other policy stances ===
Although he has often spoken in favour of privatisation and lessening the state role in economy, Kudrin also supported the creation of the so-called national champions. Kudrin has said that the state's role in the oil industry should not be increased, and has indicated that the purchase of Sibneft by Gazprom and the merger of some former Yukos assets to state-controlled oil company Rosneft were taken at a particular stage of the restructuring of the sector. According to Kudrin, "no-one regards state ownership of such assets as an end in itself" and "we are not going to see a continuous strengthening of the state’s position."

As Finance Minister, Kudrin has also supported increasing the retirement age and cutting down on bureaucracy. For his policies, he has often been the target of criticism, especially from the United Russia party, which he has refused to join. According to Renaissance Capital, Kudrin's poll ratings are not favourable as he is seen as responsible for some highly criticized welfare reforms, although economic experts say that the reforms proved to be highly effective.

=== The Great Recession and its aftermath ===
In the aftermath of the late 2000s global economic crisis, Russia's state budget went into deficit for the first time in years. Kudrin has said that the projected budget deficit is to total 3.6% in 2011, 3.1% in 2012 and 2.9% in 2013. The deficit will be covered primarily through expanded market borrowing. Russia conducted its first international debt sale since 1998 in April 2010, raising $5.5bn on the international markets. According to Kudrin, the government's aim is to attain a deficit-free budget by 2015, based on projected $75–78 oil prices per barrel. Kudrin has said that the Reserve Fund, accumulated before the crisis, will run out in 2011. Consequently, Kudrin warned that Russia will soon have to adjust to being a country, just "like everyone else" and called for a more effective use of state funds.

=== Finance Minister of the Year 2010 ===
In October 2010, Kudrin was declared "Finance Minister of the Year 2010" by the Euromoney magazine. The magazine said that "Kudrin is rightly hailed as a fiscal manager of the highest order" and praised his "championing of the free market and fiscal prudence". According to Euromoney, the Stabilization Fund created and supported by Kudrin also "enabled Russia to pay off its foreign debt early", and noted that "Kudrin is rightly praised for his commitment to tax and budget reform, Russia’s desire to join the World Trade Organization (WTO) and continuing the progress in privatization."

In the award ceremony, Kudrin said: "Russia has already learnt this lesson; it was able to prepare and pass through this period. In this context, this is a result. And when you see your result, you feel satisfied. And when the result is praised by the professional community, it is especially important."

== Back to academia ==
Since his retirement from September 2011 to May 2022, Kudrin has been the Dean of the Faculty of Liberal Arts and Sciences of St. Petersburg University. As of 2016, he is co-chairman of the board of trustees of the Mariinsky Theatre, and the chairman of the foundation of the board of trustees of the European University at St. Petersburg.

=== Political activities ===
Kurdrin is the head of the Civil Initiatives Committee, a Non Governmental Organization which promotes Human Right and development of Civil society in Russia. At the opening of the All-Russian Civil Forum, organized by his Committee, Kudrin said the Law on non-governmental organizations - "foreign agents" should be abolished or completely reworded.

=== 2014 sanctions ===
Kudrin said in November 2014 that "Formal and informal sanctions have already seriously impacted the Russian economy. Bringing back the previous opportunities when it comes to foreign investment and trust in the rouble can be achieved only within seven to 10 years of growth of our economy."

== Speculation on future roles ==
During his 2012 presidential campaign, businessman Mikhail Prokhorov said he would appoint Kudrin as Prime Minister, but, Prokhorov lost the election.

=== 2018 presidential campaign speculation ===
On 18 June 2015, Kudrin proposed to hold snap presidential elections. He justified this need for global reform and cited the example of the President of Kazakhstan Nursultan Nazarbayev, who did just that. State Duma deputy from the party A Just Russia Mikhail Emelyanov considered this statement Kudrin's entry into the presidential race. The next day, Kudrin said that he is not going to run for the presidency. However, many experts continued to believe that Kudrin wants to return to the Federal Government, and even take the place of the Prime Minister.

== Chairman of the Accounts Chamber ==
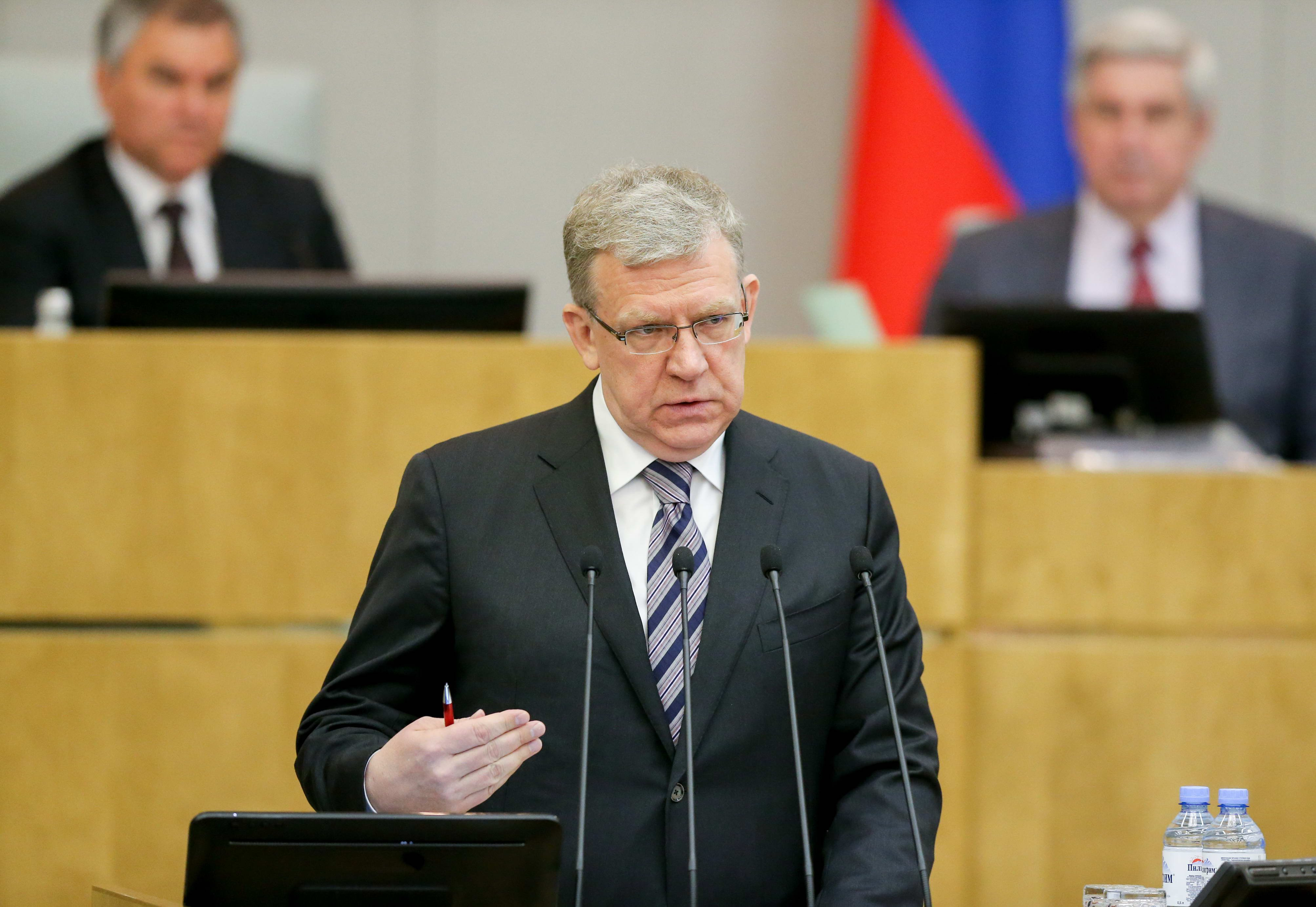
Kudrin at his confirmation hearing in the State Duma on 22 May 2018

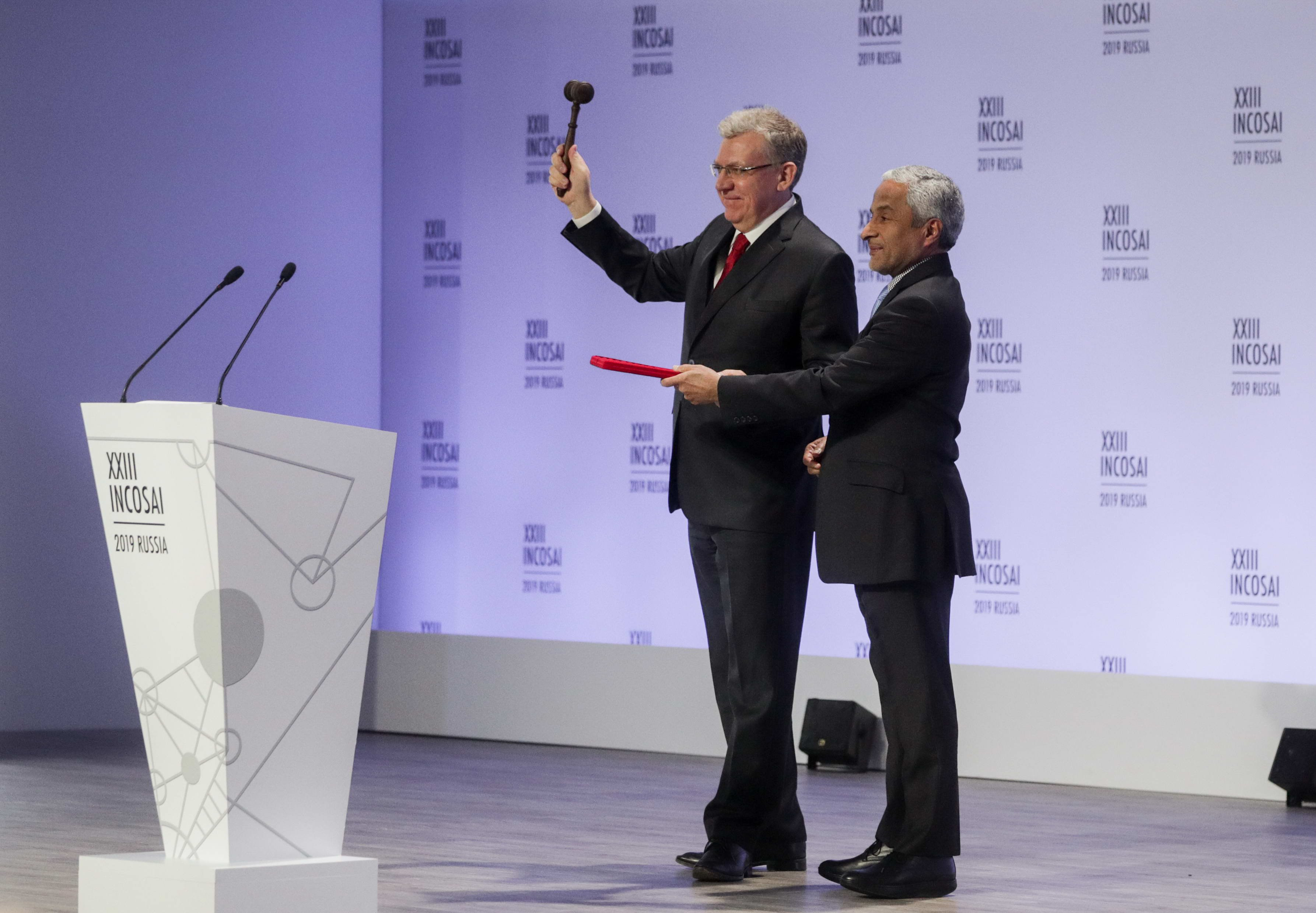
Kudrin during the inauguration of the President of the INTOSAI

After the 2018 Russian presidential election during the formation of the new government, Prime Minister Dmitry Medvedev nominated Chairwoman of the Accounts Chamber Tatyana Golikova as Deputy Prime Minister. On 10 May, the United Russia party proposed to nominate Kudrin to post of chairman of the Accounts Chamber, instead of Golikova. This was the most anticipated nomination, as pundits observed that Kudrin's role in the new government would set the degree of reformative policies under Putin's fourth term. The low-importance of the position led some observers to speculate that this development signals that the new government has no sizable plans for economic reforms. On 11 May, the party leader Dmitry Medvedev agreed on the candidacy of Kudrin with the parliamentary faction. On 14 May, at a meeting with the Presidium of the faction, Kudrin officially agreed to nominate his candidacy. According to Russian legislation, the State Duma nominates at least three candidates for the post of chairman of the Accounts Chamber, one of whom the President submits to the State Duma for approval. In addition to Kudrin, Anatoly Aksakov from A Just Russia, Yury Sinelshchikov from the Communist Party and Maxim Rokhmistrov from the Liberal Democratic Party also was nominated for this post. On 21 May, Vladimir Putin nominated Kudrin for the chairman. On 22 May, State Duma approved Kudrin in office, with 264 votes in favor. On the same day, the speaker of the State Duma Vyacheslav Volodin introduced Kudrin to the members of the Accounts Chamber.

On 25 September 2019, Russia took over the presidency of the International Organization of Supreme Audit Institutions, and Kudrin took over as president of the organization.

On 29 November 2022, Alexei Kudrin announced his intention to resign as chairman of the Accounts Chamber in order to work in the private sector. On the same day, President Putin submitted to the Federation Council a submission on the dismissal of Kudrin from office.

On 30 November 2022, the Federation Council dismissed Alexei Kudrin from the post of head of the Accounting Chamber.

== Kudrin and Yandex ==
In September 2022, the media learned about the offer that Kudrin was made by the founder of Yandex, Arkady Volozh. He offered the head of the Accounts Chamber 5% of the company for help in dividing it into two parts. Volozh plans to separate the business of unmanned vehicles into a separate structure and develop it in Europe. The rest of Yandex will remain in Russia. There were also rumors that Kudrin was offered a leadership position in the Russian part of Yandex. At the end of September, Pavel Demidov, a longtime employee of Kudrin, moved from the Accounts Chamber to Yandex to the position of GR manager. In November 2022, Putin asked the Federation Council to dismiss Kudrin from his position as head of the Accounts Chamber. The Federation Council will hold a vote on November 30. On December 9, 2022, Kudrin started working at Yandex as a Corporate Development Advisor. Kudrin was sanctioned by the OFAC for operating in the technology sector of the Russian Federation economy.

== Personal life ==
Alexei Kudrin was married to a Moroccan woman, and they had a daughter together. His wife has passed away. His hobbies include tennis, swimming and music.

Political offices
Preceded by Mikhail Kasyanov	Minister of Finance; 2000–2011	Succeeded by Anton Siluanov
Government offices
Preceded by Tatyana Golikova	Chairman of the Accounts Chamber; 2018–present	Succeeded by Incumbent
