= Misha Mavashi =

Misha Mavashi Миша Маваши
- Born: Mikhail Fyodorovich Nits; January 29, 1985; Kostanay, Kazakh SSR, Soviet Union
- Died: October 25, 2026 (aged 41) Voronezh, Russia
- Genres: Hip hop, alternative rock
- Occupations: Rapper, songwriter, activist
- Years active: 2009–2026

Mikhail Fyodorovich Nits (Russian: Михаил Фёдорович Ниц; 29 January 1985 – 25 October 2026), known professionally as Misha Mavashi (Russian: Миша Маваши), was a Russian rapper who became the subject of internet memes, as well as the frontman and founder of the musical projects TselRazgrom and Mavashi Group. He was also the founder of the far-right movement Northern Man.

== Biography ==
=== Early life ===
Nits was born on 29 January 1985 in Kostanay, in the Kazakh Soviet Socialist Republic of the Soviet Union. His father practised weightlifting and held the title of Master of Sport. Mavashi took gymnastics and swimming lessons as a child and practised kickboxing as a teenager. He had an older brother, Vyacheslav, who worked as a neurosurgeon. He took part in sports from an early age, an experience that later influenced his music.

After finishing school, Mavashi moved to Chelyabinsk, where he studied law. According to his account, after returning to Kazakhstan he worked for about three months as an assistant lawyer specialising in civil cases before taking a job at an auto-parts shop. He later applied for a dispatcher position at Astana's airport, but was not hired.

=== Music career ===
==== Solo work ====
Mavashi began pursuing music actively in 2009. He later said that he had turned to music after two close friends were murdered and two other acquaintances developed drug addictions. He bought a laptop, installed audio-editing software and began by making instrumental compositions before gradually moving on to writing lyrics. His early songs had a hooligan-oriented tone, but he later decided to focus on social issues. In an interview with the magazine Missiya, he linked this shift to the Manezh Square riots in Moscow in December 2010. He explained that his stage name, “Mavashi”, referred to a kick to the head in Eastern martial arts.

He released the solo albums Tolko pravda (Only the Truth, 2009), To, chto videl (What I Saw, 2011), Zerno (Grain, 2012), Iznanka (The Flip Side, 2013) and Pitbul (Pit Bull, 2017). His lyrics addressed responsibility, personal principles and a healthy lifestyle. His best-known songs included “Moya krepost” (“My Fortress”) and “Pomnit dolzhen” (“You Must Remember”). In the early 2010s, however, he distanced himself from the perception that his work consisted solely of rap about sports and healthy living, noting that his discography also included lyrical, satirical and hooligan-oriented songs. Arkady Romanov, author of the book Eto bylo v Rossii: muzyka 2010-kh ot kal'yan-repa do postpanka (It Happened in Russia: Music of the 2010s from Hookah Rap to Post-Punk), described Mavashi as one of the performers who enjoyed considerable popularity among young people with right-wing views in the early 2010s, alongside the groups 25/17 and Grot.

Mavashi said that the hooligan themes of his early albums reflected his circumstances at the time, when he had neither a job nor money. He also said that the negative response to his music contributed to his notoriety.

In February 2017, people associated with Mavashi attacked rapper Pasha Technique in Voronezh, where he had arrived to perform. A group of unidentified people assaulted Technique with a dildo, filmed the incident and forced him to apologise to Mavashi for a post in which Technique had insulted him.

==== TselRazgrom ====
In 2014, Mavashi created the side project TselRazgrom, which consisted of Mavashi and beatmaker Edik Stechkin. The music video for “Davay, ne namazyvay” (“Come On, Don't Smear It”) was released in October 2014. The music publication The Flow noted that Mavashi used elements of trap in the project while retaining his characteristic themes of physical and spiritual strength. The project released two albums, Kraynyaya neobkhodimost (Extreme Necessity) and Vdavayas v podrobnosti (Going into Detail), as well as the bonus track “Moi pravila” (“My Rules”), which appeared on the first album, and two official music videos. The video for “Davay, ne namazyvay” was released on 20 October 2014, followed by “Imperiya zla” (“Empire of Evil”) on 10 March 2015. The side project later disbanded.In 2016, Mavashi began using prescription medication to treat depression and subsequently developed a dependency. In a 2020 interview with The Flow, he said that he had taken antidepressants and sleeping pills and could barely remember events from November 2016 to the end of February 2017. According to Mavashi, an acquaintance helped arrange treatment in Voronezh, where he spent about a month and a half before settling in the city. In the same interview, he said that his creative interests had gradually shifted from sports and healthy living to love, death and creation. He also rejected the idea that his music could be reduced to healthy-lifestyle themes, pointing to songs in his discography that addressed other subjects.

In February 2017, Mavashi also told Afisha Daily that he had spent five months in a Kazakh prison after a road-rage incident. The publication investigated his account by contacting Kazakhstan's Ministry of Internal Affairs. The ministry replied that Nits had not been criminally prosecuted or imprisoned in the country, and had only faced administrative penalties for traffic violations.

==== Mavashi Group ====
In 2018, Mavashi founded Mavashi Group and became its frontman. The group's music combined rap and alternative rock. Mavashi wrote the group's lyrics.

In 2019, he appeared in BEEF: Russian Hip-Hop, a documentary film by rapper Roma Zhigan about the history of Russian hip hop. In 2021, Mavashi married Valeria Voyevodina, the vocalist of Mavashi Group. That year, he published a poetry collection titled Chitaya stikhi (Reading Poems), combining poems with recollections of friends, tours and difficult periods of his life, as well as reflections on literature and his creative development.

In 2022, Mavashi took part in the St. Petersburg International Legal Forum, speaking on “The right to self-defence and the protection of one's home: theory and law enforcement”.

In 2023, Mavashi announced that he had divorced Voyevodina. He said he would not have discussed the separation publicly if it had not affected the group's activities. Voyevodina subsequently left the group.

=== Political views ===
==== Russian invasion of Ukraine ====
Mavashi supported Russia's invasion of Ukraine and delivered humanitarian aid to areas affected by the fighting. He also took credit for the cancellation of concerts by the band Mashina Vremeni, whose frontman Andrei Makarevich opposed the invasion. Ukraine's National Agency on Corruption Prevention proposed imposing international sanctions on Mavashi, describing him as a Russian nationalist who publicly supported Russia's war against Ukraine. He was later included by the Anti-Corruption Foundation in its list of corrupt officials and warmongers on similar grounds.

On 8 September 2025, a Ukrainian court sentenced Mavashi in absentia to eight years in prison with confiscation of property for “financing actions aimed at changing the borders of Ukraine”. The case concerned donations he collected and directed to Russian military personnel fighting in Ukraine.

==== Northern Man ====
Mavashi was known for his nationalist views. In March 2021, he released the song “Severny chelovek” (“Northern Man”); several months later, he began publicly discussing the creation of a far-right civic association to oppose immigration. Registration of the organisation began in May 2022. On 25 November that year, channels and chats for members of the Severny Chelovek movement were opened in 31 cities.

The movement described its aim as “uniting Russian people so that they can help one another in times of trouble and so that families can be friends”.

Mavashi publicly said that he would not cooperate with the authorities. However, according to Novaya Gazeta, some regional branches received state grants and worked with local administrations, including in Chelyabinsk and Vologda. Members of the movement also took part in police raids targeting migrants and in confrontations with people from other ethnic groups. Mavashi described Severny Chelovek as an ethnic movement. His later songs increasingly addressed Russian national character and ethnic identity, accompanied by aggressive rhetoric towards people from the Caucasus. According to Radio Free Europe/Radio Liberty, movement members also carried out attacks on LGBT people in several Russian cities.

In March 2023, activists from the organisation published a video in which a teenager from Perm apologised to “Russian Orthodox people” for burning an icon. The teenager had reportedly been flogged beforehand. In August that year, Mavashi drew attention to a 13-year-old teenager of Armenian descent in Belgorod Oblast who had pulled down his trousers in front of another teenager; the first boy subsequently received threats. In spring 2024, movement activists supported protests against the construction of a mosque in Moscow's Kosino-Ukhtomsky District. In September, they joined the Procession of the Cross on Nevsky Prospekt alongside the Russian Community and the Academic Movement. In November, the organisation complained to law enforcement about a concert by rapper Code80 in Vladivostok, describing his music as “antisocial”; the concert was subsequently cancelled.

==== Charitable work ====
Mavashi was a trustee of the Zhivi, malysh (“Live, Baby”) charitable foundation and worked with the Zdorovaya strana (“Healthy Country”) foundation, which focused on the rehabilitation of people with drug and alcohol dependencies.

=== Death ===
Mavashi died in Voronezh during the night of 24–25 October 2026, aged 41. On the morning of 25 October, an associate announced his death in a video posted to the artist's official Telegram channel. The associate said that Mavashi had died “as a result of an accident”, but did not disclose the circumstances and asked people not to spread rumours until more information became available. Nikolai Voytenko, the concert director of Mavashi Group, also confirmed the death without providing further details.

On the evening of 25 October, the newspaper Kommersant, citing its own source, reported that Mavashi's wife was in an adjoining room when she heard a gunshot and called an ambulance. Mavashi was taken to an emergency hospital and admitted to intensive care, but could not be saved. The newspaper reported that he died from severe blood loss and cerebral edema, and that the preliminary version of events was an accidental injury while disassembling and cleaning a hunting rifle. The Russian Investigative Committee's official statement did not confirm these details.

On 15 October 2026, ten days before his death, Mavashi announced that he had married a woman named Ekaterina and posted photographs from the ceremony on social media.

== Internet memes ==
In the mid-2010s, Mavashi became the subject of internet memes and widespread trolling. Users posted the phrase “ko-ko-ko” in comments under his posts, songs and news stories about him, and compared him to a “rooster” (a derogatory prison slang term). The title of his third album, Zerno (“Grain”), also became a source of mockery.

In February 2017, Afisha Daily wrote that a “ko-ko-ko” comment flash mob had become popular on social media posts about the rapper. Video blogger Yury Khovansky later joined the mockery and dedicated a parody song to Mavashi. Mavashi said that he initially did not understand the meaning of the comments, but later learned of Khovansky's role in spreading the jokes. He eventually disabled comments across all his social media accounts. In a 2020 interview with The Flow, Mavashi recalled that the trolling had upset him and affected his life.
