= 2026 Russian legislative election =

- 18–20 September 2026

All 450 seats to the State Duma 226 seats needed for a majority
- Opinion polls
- Turnout: 59.58% (▲7.86 pp)
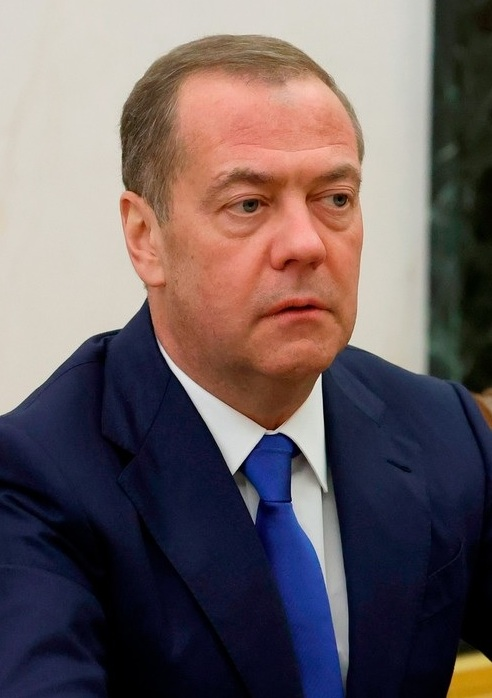

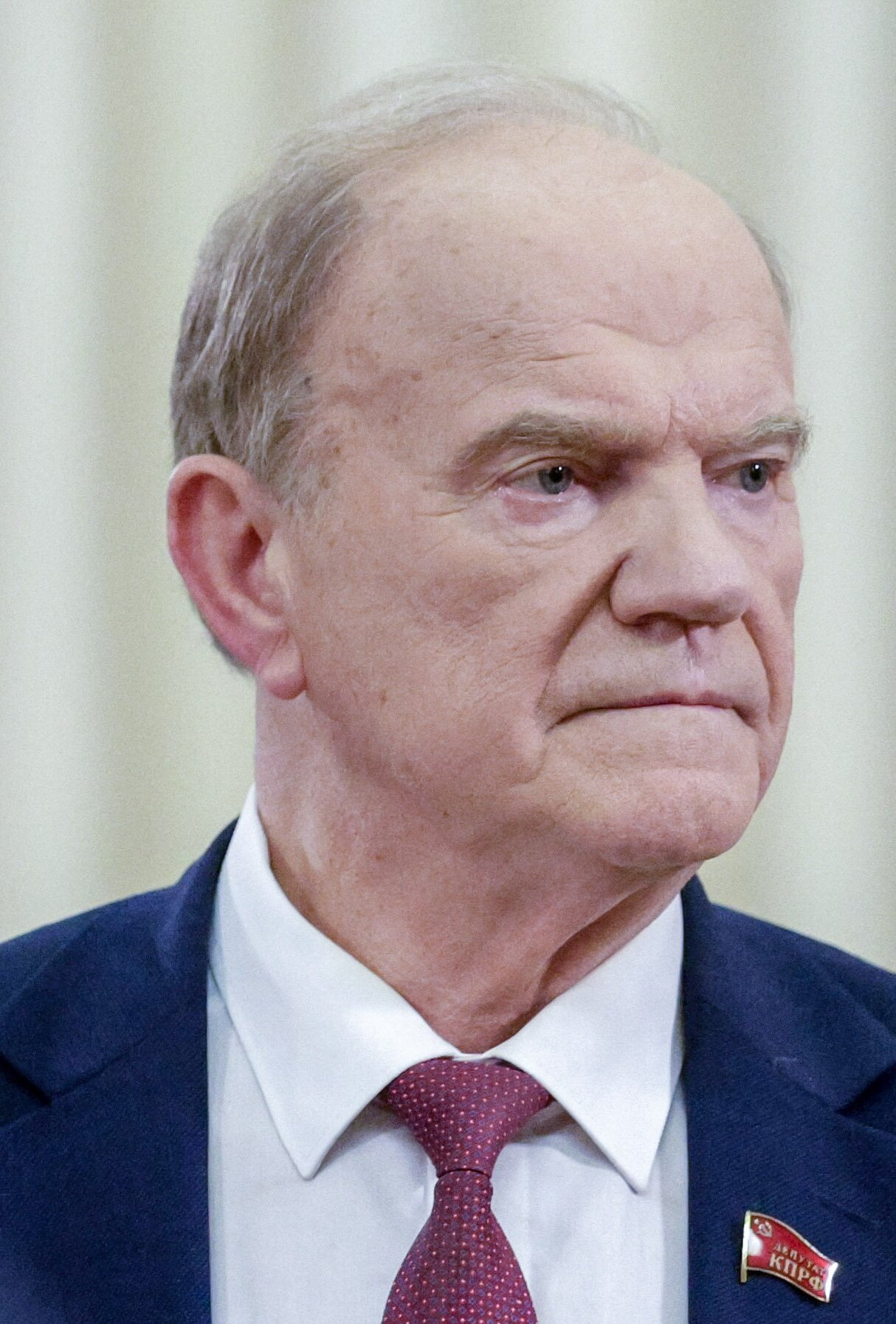

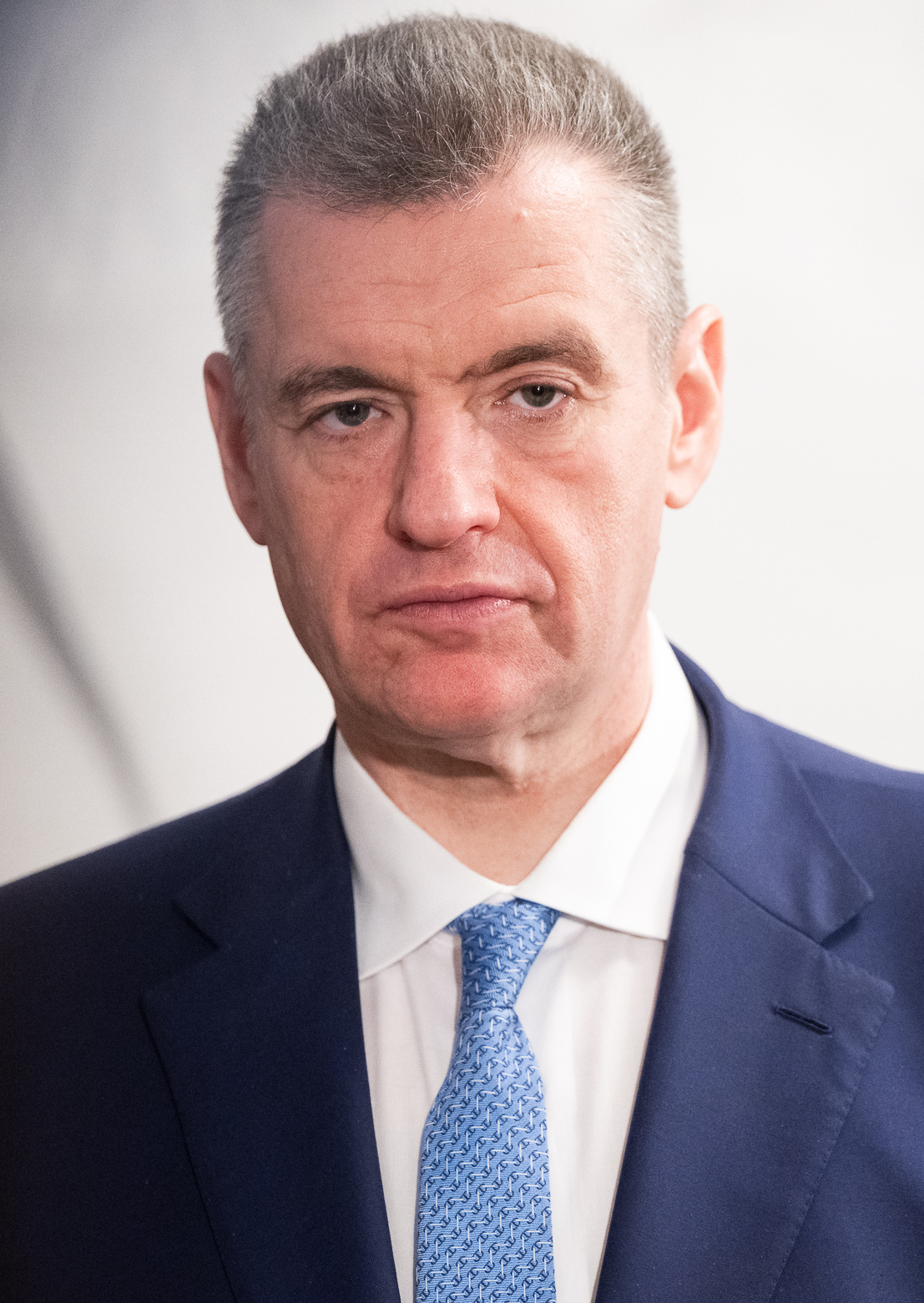

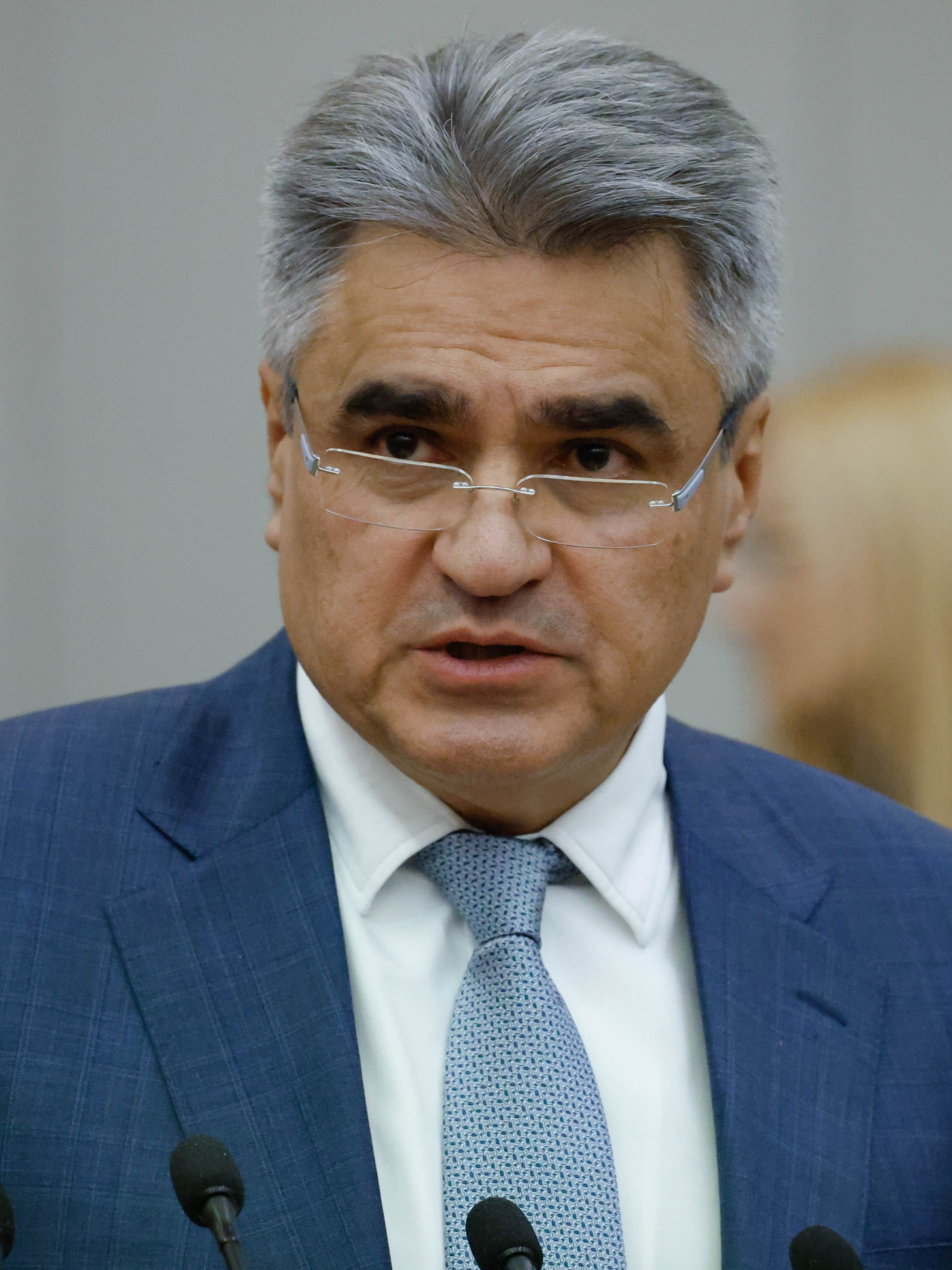

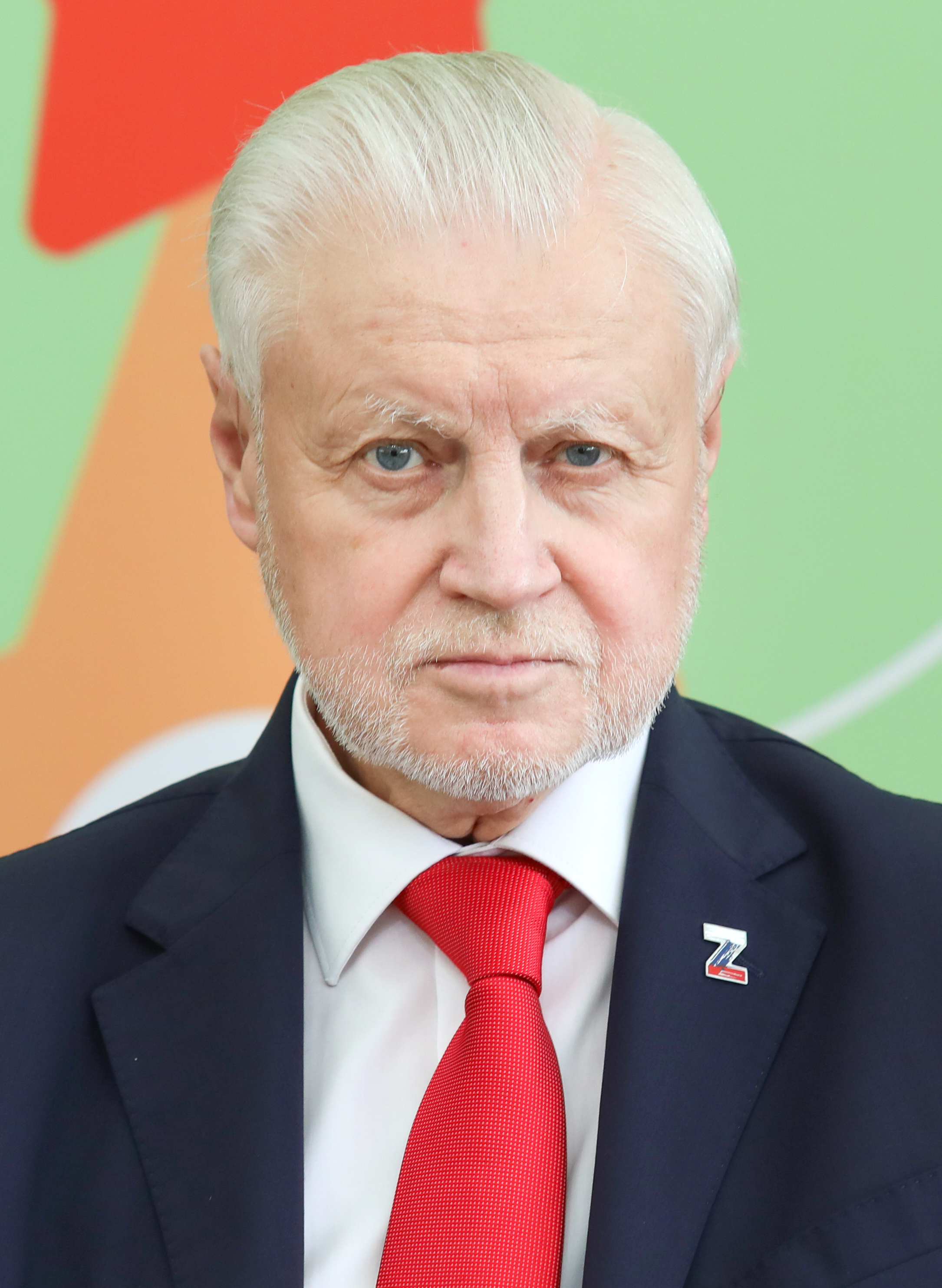
	First party	Second party	Third party
Leader	Dmitry Medvedev	Gennady Zyuganov	Leonid Slutsky
Party	United Russia	CPRF	LDPR
Leader since	26 May 2012	14 February 1993	27 May 2022
Leader's seat	Did not stand	Party list	Party list
Last election	324	57	21
Seats won	349	37	23
Seat change	▲25	▼20	▲2
Popular vote	39,118,497	9,051,776	5,970,578
Percentage	59.01%	13.66%	9.01%
Swing	▲9.19 pp	▼5.27 pp	▲1.46 pp
	Fourth party	Fifth party
Leader	Alexey Nechayev	Sergey Mironov
Party	New People	A Just Russia
Leader since	8 August 2020	27 October 2013
Leader's seat	Party list	Party list
Last election	13	27
Seats won	19	17
Seat change	▲6	▼10
Popular vote	5,253,202	3,589,806
Percentage	7.92%	5.42%
Swing	▲2.60 pp	▼2.04 pp
- United Russia CPRF LDPR A Just Russia Rodina Independents
Chairman of the State Duma before election
Vyacheslav Volodin
United Russia
Elected Chairman of the State Duma
Vyacheslav Volodin
United Russia

Logo of the election campaign ("Your vote is the power of Russia!")

Legislative elections were held in Russia from 18 to 20 September 2026, to elect all 450 seats of the 9th State Duma, the lower house of the Federal Assembly. Going into the election, United Russia was the incumbent and largest party with 310 seats, with Vladimir Putin having been re-elected as president in 2024.

This election was unique as the first to take place following the Russian invasion of Ukraine, and the first Russian legislative election to take place in the occupied territories of Ukraine, and Transnistria, an occupied unrecognized breakaway region of Moldova. Attacks occurred in both Moscow and the occupied territories by the Ukrainian armed forces during voting.

In party-list seats, eleven parties were automatically included on the ballot, however the centre-left and anti-war party Yabloko party was banned from these seats by the Supreme Court of Russia.

The elections resulted in United Russia gaining seats and retaining its supermajority. The Liberal Democratic Party of Russia and New People parties also gained seats while the Communist Party of the Russian Federation and A Just Russia lost seats.

== Background ==
Legislative elections were last held in 2021 from 17 to 19 September. United Russia once again obtained a constitutional majority with 324 seats, but lost 14 party-list seats and 5 constituency seats. The Communist Party (CPRF) remained in second with 57 seats, with A Just Russia – For Truth and the Liberal Democratic Party of Russia (LDPR) remaining in third and fourth place with 27 and 21 seats respectively. A Just Russia merged with Patriots of Russia and Zakhar Prilepin's For Truth party in January 2021.

For the first time since the 2003 elections, more than four parties crossed the 5 percent threshold to be allocated party-list seats: the CPRF increased its party-list seats from 35 to 48 seats; the LDPR decreased from 34 to 19; A Just Russia – For Truth increased from 16 to 19, related to the merger of A Just Russia with Patriots of Russia and For Truth party; and the right-liberal New People party gained 13 seats. However, the 2021 election is considered by opposition not alleged to have links to the Kremlin to be falsified, unfair, and unjust due to systematic violations and the exclusion of independent candidates and parties.

Presidential elections were last held in 2024 from 15 to 17 March 2024, with a record turnout of 77.49%. Incumbent president Vladimir Putin was re-elected with 87.28% of the vote. The election was considered by non-systemic opposition to be the most unfair and unjust election in the history of Russia.

The non-systemic opposition have previously attempted to participate in Russian elections. Smart Voting was utilized during the 2021 legislative election, and in the 2024 presidential election spoilt voting and voting for anyone except Vladimir Putin was encouraged. Alongside this, protests occurred which were organised by the Noon Against Putin campaign. Due to the Russian invasion of Ukraine and subsequent tightening of legislation, politicians and public figures from the non-systemic opposition were subject to imprisonment, being designated as foreign agents, or being forced to emigrate. The leader of the non-systemic opposition, Alexei Navalny, died in prison on 16 February 2024.

On 10 August 2026, the Russian Supreme Court banned the principal opposition party, Yabloko, from participating in the election. The pro-Kremlin Rodina party had brought a case against them, accusing them of copyright infringement, extremism, and receiving ilicit foreign funding. The party had received support from the non-systemic opposition including Yulia Navalnaya, Alexei Navalny's widow, as well as Lyubov Sobol, Ilya Yashin, Andrei Pivovarov, Dmitry Bykov, and Oleg Orlov. On the same day, the party's deputy leader, Lev Shlosberg, was sentenced to 11 years and one month in a penal colony over his opposition to the war in Ukraine. Dozens of supporters and journalists who came to hear the Supreme Court's decision were detained and moved to nearby police stations, which party leader Nikolay Rybakov decried as intimidation.

=== Preparation for the election ===
In June 2026, Interfax estimated that the Russian CEC may receive up to ₽27.4 billion, of which 23.3 billion rubles would be directed towards organizing the State Duma elections.

On 16 June 2026, president Vladimir Putin signed a decree scheduling the elections for 20 September 2026.

On 17 June 2026, the CEC published a calendar of events for the preparation and conduct of the elections to the State Duma of Russia. It was announced that the elections to the State Duma and other combined elections and referendums will take plover several consecutive days. The election slogan was introduced: "Your vote is the strength of Russia".

== Electoral system ==
Under Russian electoral law, a State Duma's term is limited to a maximum of five years and each seat is elected via a parallel voting system. This means that half of the seats are elected under a party-list proportional representation system with a threshold of 5 percent; and the other half are elected in 225 single-member constituencies via first-past-the-post (FPTP) voting.

For the proportional seats, candidates are nominated by political parties, and political party lists must include between 200 and 400 candidates. The list can include candidates who are not party members, but they cannot make up more than 50% of the total candidates on the list. The party list may also be divided into federal and regional sections, of which the latter includes regional groupings of candidates that correspond to the federal subjects of Russia. The number of regional groups must be at least 35, and a maximum of 15 candidates can be included on federal section of candidates. The regional parts of the party list must cover the entire territory of Russia. A party's list can be formed from solely regional groups, as having a federal section is not mandatory.

In the FPTP seats, candidates can be nominated by political parties or themselves. The political party must provide a list of candidates to the Central Election Commission, and the list must contain the name and number of the constituencies in which each candidate is planning to run in. Self nominations, party nominations, must submit applications to the District Election Commissions. Self nominated candidates must collect signatures from at least 3% of voters in the constituency, or at least 3,000 signatures if the constituency has less than 100,000 registered voters. A candidate can be nominated in both types of constituency however if elected in both seats they must vacate one of the seats.

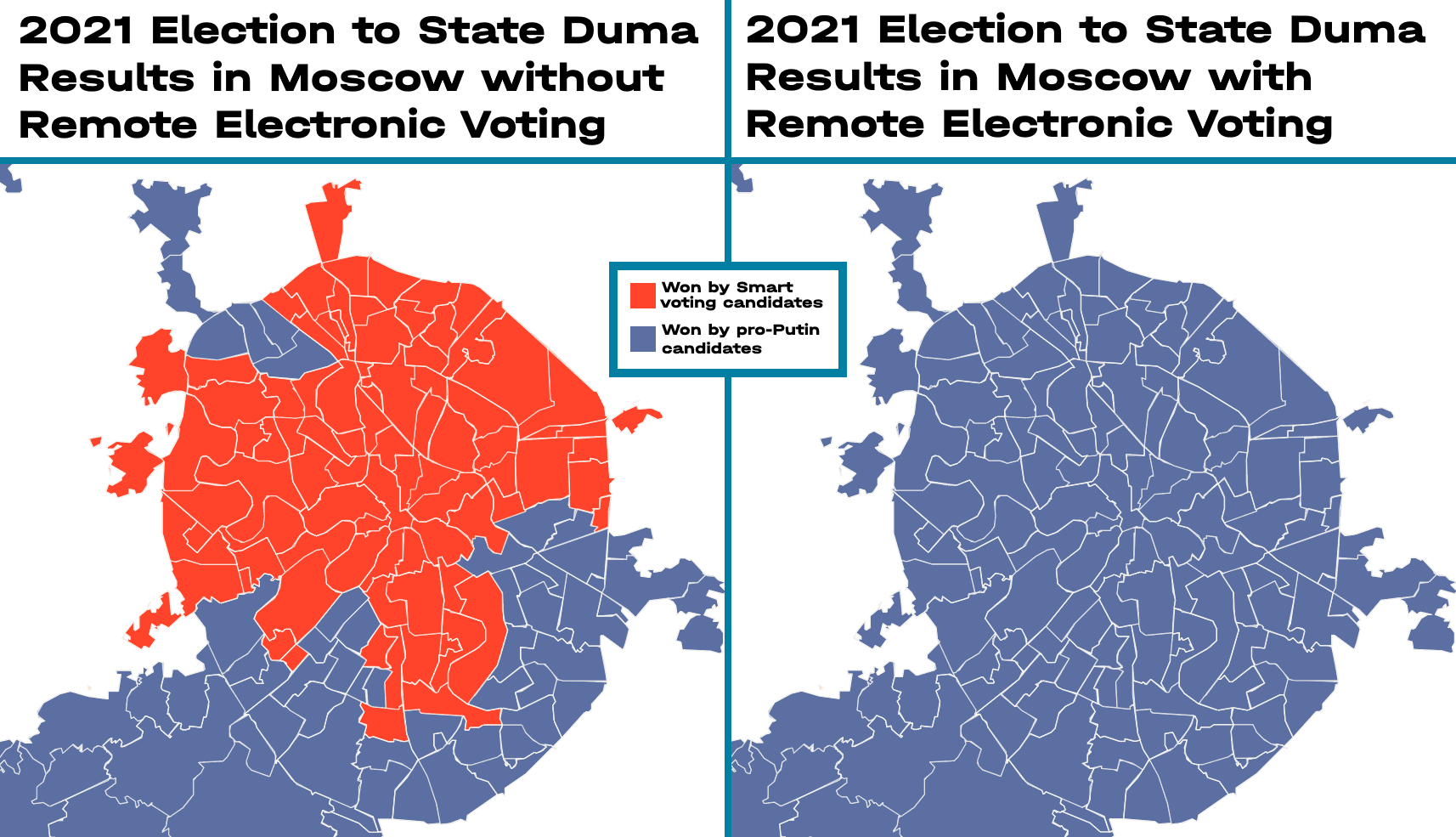
2021 election to the State Duma with and without Remote Electronic Voting

Electronic voting which was used against electoral fraud, in the previous legislative election and elections to Moscow City Duma, was planned to be rolled out to 33 regions and would cover roughly 48 million eligible voters during the election.

== Redistricting ==
Map of constituencies to be used in the 2026 election

The State Duma constituencies were last redrawn in 2015 to be used for a period of ten years. In April 2025 the Central Election Commission of Russia introduced a new map of 225 constituencies which would be used for the 2026 elections. Unlike previous redistricting, the new constituencies will be used for a period of five years, meaning they will be redrawn again before the next Russian legislative election. In the Russian-occupied regions of Ukraine, constituencies were established in the regions which have been occupied since 2022. Three were created in Donetsk, two in Luhansk, one in Kherson, and one in Zaporizhzhia; the constituencies in Crimea, which was annexed in 2014, were significantly re-arranged.

Within Russia's internationally recognized borders, three regions gained one constituency each: Moscow (16), Moscow Oblast (12) and Krasnodar Krai (9), while ten regions – Rostov Oblast (6), Altai Krai (3), Volgograd Oblast (3), Voronezh Oblast (3), Zabaykalsky Krai (1), Ivanovo Oblast (1), Kaluga Oblast (1), Smolensk Oblast (1), Tambov Oblast (1), Tomsk Oblast (1) lost one constituency. Constituencies were significantly re-arranged in Dagestan, Tatarstan, Chelyabinsk Oblast, Sverdlovsk Oblast and Saint Petersburg, minor changes were made to districts in Chuvashia, Kursk Oblast, Leningrad Oblast, Lipetsk Oblast, Samara Oblast, Ulyanovsk Oblast and Vladimir Oblast. Furthermore, most of the constituencies in Krasnodar Krai and Rostov Oblast were renamed.

On 20 May 2025, the State Duma adopted the new constituency map during the third reading by a 396–3 vote with Galina Khovanskaya (SR–ZP), Marina Kim (SR–ZP) and Yevgeny Marchenko (Independent) voting against the changes. Khovanskaya raised vocal opposition to the new map, objecting the removal of Sokol District from her constituency, Leningradsky. On 21 May the Federation Council unanimously approved the new map and on 23 May, President Vladimir Putin signed the bill into law.

=== New seats ===
Ten new districts were created after the 2025 redistricting process:

- Makiivka constituency (Donetsk People's Republic)
- Donetsk constituency (Donetsk People's Republic)
- Horlivka constituency (Donetsk People's Republic)
- Luhansk constituency (Luhansk People's Republic)
- Alchevsk constituency (Luhansk People's Republic)
- South-Western constituency (Krasnodar Krai)
- Zaporizhzhia constituency (Zaporizhzhia Oblast)
- Mytishchi constituency (Moscow Oblast)
- Kherson constituency (Kherson Oblast)
- Solntsevo constituency (Moscow)

=== Seats eliminated ===
The following districts were eliminated and became obsolete:

- Rubtsovsk constituency (Altai Krai)
- Dauria constituency (Zabaykalsky Krai)
- Krasnoarmeysky constituency (Volgograd Oblast)
- Pravoberezhny constituency (Voronezh Oblast)
- Kineshma constituency (Ivanovo Oblast)
- Obninsk constituency (Kaluga Oblast)
- Shakhty constituency (Rostov Oblast)
- Roslavl constituency (Smolensk Oblast)
- Rasskazovo constituency (Tambov Oblast)
- Ob constituency (Tomsk Oblast)

== Political parties ==
Newsletters of A Just Russia (left) and New People (right) promoting themselves ahead of the elections

As of December 2023, 25 political parties are registered in Russia. According to nomination rules, a party must collect 200,000 signatures to be eligible to appear on the ballot. Parties already represented in the State Duma via party-list seats or represented in at least one of regional parliaments (also by party list) are automatically included.

=== Parties Automatically on ballot ===
This list contains political parties that have held conventions, nominated candidates and successfully had their party and candidates registered. As of 30 July 2026, all parties eligible for automatic inclusion on the ballot have held conventions, submitted their lists and obtained their registration.

No. on ballot	Party	Abb.	Party leader	No. 1 in federal party list	Convention date	Political position	Ideologies	Party list	SMC	Notes
1	United Russia	UR	Dmitry Medvedev	Sergey Lavrov	28 June 2026	Big tent	National conservatism / Statism / Putinism	✓	✓	CEC registered the federal list of candidates on 21 July
~~2~~	Yabloko	Yabloko	Nikolay Rybakov	Yaroslav Shcherbakov	27 June 2026	Centre-left	Social liberalism / Pro-Europeanism / Progressivism / Anti-war	✘	✓	CEC registered the federal list of candidates on 29 July. Party list disqualified by the Supreme Court of Russia on 10 August. Judicial appeal of the court decision is expected, 127 party candidates in single-member majoritarian constituencies have not been disqualified.
3	Liberal Democratic Party of Russia	LDPR	Leonid Slutsky	Leonid Slutsky	23 June 2026	Right-wing to far-right	Russian nationalism / Pan-Slavism / Ultranationalism	✓	✓	CEC registered the federal list of candidates on 22 July
4	Party of Direct Democracy	PPD	Tatyana Kolnauz	None	3 July 2026	Centre to centre-right	Direct democracy / E-democracy	✓	✓	CEC registered the federal list of candidates on 30 July
5	Russian Ecological Party "The Greens"	The Greens	Konstantin Atayan	Marina Shishkina	5 July 2026	Centre	Green politics / Agrarianism	✓	✓	CEC registered the federal list of candidates on 30 July
6	A Just Russia	SR	Sergey Mironov	Sergey Mironov	4 July 2026	Centre-left	Socialism of the 21st century / Social democracy / Social conservatism	✓	✓	CEC registered the federal list of candidates on 23 July
7	Rodina	Rodina	Aleksey Zhuravlyov	Aleksey Zhuravlyov	28 June 2026	Far-right	Russian nationalism / National conservatism / Right-wing populism	✓	✓	CEC registered the federal list of candidates on 29 July
8	Communist Party of the Russian Federation	CPRF	Gennady Zyuganov	Gennady Zyuganov	20 June 2026	Left-wing to far-left	Communism / Marxism–Leninism	✓	✓	CEC registered the federal list of candidates on 17 July
9	Russian Party of Pensioners for Social Justice	RPPSS	Erik Prazdnikov	Erik Prazdnikov	26 June 2026	Centre to centre-right	Pensioners' interests / Social conservatism	✓	✓	CEC registered the federal list of candidates on 28 July
10	Communists of Russia	CR	Sergey Malinkovich	Sergey Malinkovich	28 June 2026	Far-left	Communism / Anti-revisionism / Stalinism	✓	✓	CEC registered the federal list of candidates on 28 July
11	New People	NL	Alexey Nechayev	Alexey Nechayev	1 July 2026	Centre to centre-right	Liberalism / Communitarianism / Regionalism	✓	✓	CEC registered the federal list of candidates on 20 July

=== Parties on ballot via signatures ===
Other registered political parties that needed to collect signatures to be included in the ballots and did not run in the elections.

Party	Party leader	Ideology	2021 election (Note: DNP stands for Did Not Participate.)
Russian Party of Freedom and Justice	Ilmi Shagan	Socialism	0.77%
Party of Russia's Rebirth	Igor Ashurbeyli	Social democracy / Democratic socialism / Civic nationalism	DNP*
Cossack Party of the Russian Federation	Sergey Kolosok	Cossacks interests	DNP*
Democratic Party of Russia	Alexander Zorin	Conservatism / Liberalism / Populism / Pro-Europeanism / Soft Putinism	DNP*
Party for Justice!	Vladimir Ponomarenko	Social conservatism	DNP*
Party of Progress	Olesya Petriyenko	Social liberalism	DNP*

* Did not participate

=== Suspended parties ===
These registered political parties were banned from participating in the elections, despite collecting the required number of signatures, due to their parties' activities being suspended by the Supreme Court.

Party	Party leader	Ideology	Decision date
Civic Platform	Rifat Shaykhutdinov	Liberal Conservatism/ Putinism	April 30, 2026
Social Protection Party	Vladimir Mikhaylov	Social democracy	December 2025

== Campaign ==
=== United Russia ===
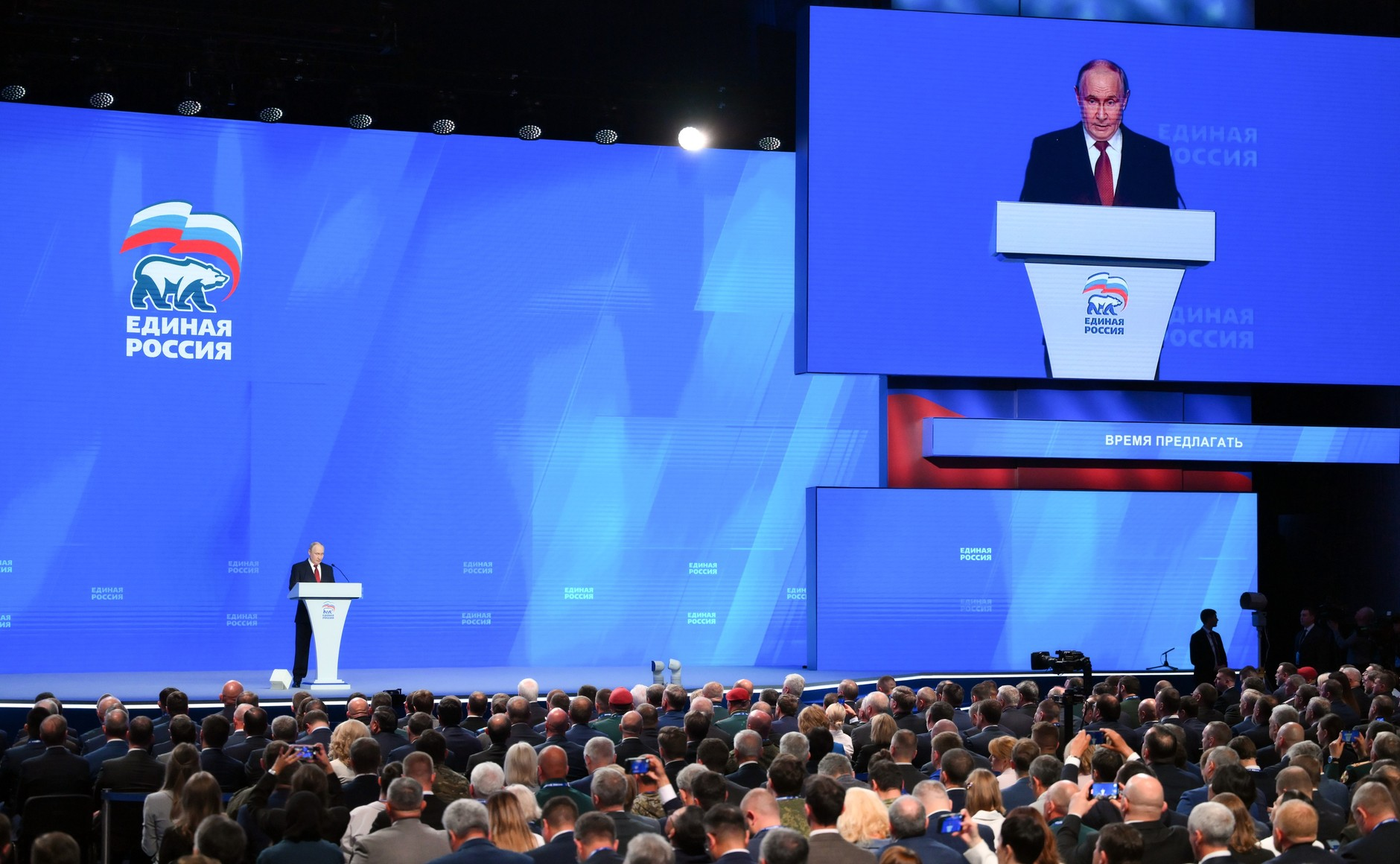
President Vladimir Putin speaks at the United Russia convention, June 23, 2026

On 21 April 2025, the Presidential Administration of Russia and United Russia began preparations for the next election. As part of forming a new party-list, incumbent deputies were assessed by regional authorities, which included rating their performance using a "traffic light system" and suggesting a potential replacement for the deputy. Evaluations were also being conducted by the Presidential Administration and the United Russia parliamentary group. In January 2026, it was announced that Vladimir Yakushev, secretary of the party's general council, had been appointed head of the party's election campaign headquarters.

United Russia's candidate selection process remained via primaries, conducted electronically for the first time. Primaries concluded in May 2026, leading to at least 37 incumbent deputies losing their primary elections. In a number of large regions, including Krasnodar Krai, Tatarstan and Bashkortostan, nearly half of the single-member constituencies lost their primary elections.

On 28 June 2026 the first stage of the party convention was held in Moscow, with President Vladimir Putin speaking, and wished the party good luck in the election, calling the electoral process a test of strength for the political system. During the event, the top five members of the federal party list were approved, which included Minister of Foreign Affairs Sergey Lavrov, Moscow Mayor Sergey Sobyanin, war correspondent Yevgeny Poddubny, Presidential Commissioner for Children's Rights Maria Lvova-Belova, and the head of the Yunarmiya movement Vladislav Golovin. Party leader Dmitry Medvedev, like in the previous election, was not included in the party list.

United Russia's final party list included 400 members. Like previous elections, United Russia utilised the political technique known as the locomotive (Note: A political technique in which more well‑known and popular figures (usually government members, governors, mayors, actors, athletes, etc., who do not really intend to be elected to parliament) are placed at the top of the party list. After the election, these frontrunners give up their seats, which are then passed down to the less prominent politicians further down the list.) in creating the list. In most regional lists, the first position was held by incumbent governors (55 governors in total) or well‑known federal politicians (e.g. Deputy Prime Minister Yury Trutnev, United Russia Secretary General, Senator Vladimir Yakushev). On the single-member constituencies, 225 candidates were nominated, making it the first time under the mixed electoral system that United Russia has nominated candidates in every single-member constituency. There was also significant attention given to the turnover present in these constituencies, as 110 of the 198 single-member seats won in 2021 nominated new candidates rather than renominating incumbents.

The second stage of the congress was held on August 22, where delegates discussed the party program for the elections. Putin used these proceedings to cement United Russia as the party that supported the war in Ukraine, using it to position the legislative elections as a referendum on the conflict. Speaking on National Flag Day, Putin emphasized the unity of the home front and the frontline, pointing to the stability of the Russian state despite conducting elections amid an active conflict.

=== Communist Party of the Russian Federation ===
According to First Deputy Chairman Yury Afonin, the KPRF's goal for the election was to retain the same amount of seats won in the 2021 election.

Members of the Communist Party reported facing increased interference from state authorities ahead of the election. In Altai Krai, a region where the Communist Party has traditionally been strongest, at least eleven prominent members of the regional party were arrested between November 2025 and February 2026.

The party's convention was held on 20 June 2026, in which candidates were nominated and the party's electoral programme was approved. Party leader Gennady Zyuganov's statement at the convention about the need to withdraw 30 trillion rubles from bank deposits and direct them to the development of the economy was widely reported by the media. Zyuganov later denied that he had proposed withdrawing money from citizens' bank accounts to replenish the budget, saying that his words had been taken out of context and misinterpreted. According to him, he was talking about the "wrong" economic model and the high key rate of the Central Bank, in which it is more profitable for citizens and businesses to keep savings on investments than to invest in economic development.

=== Liberal Democratic Party ===
The Liberal Democratic Party was the first party to launch its election campaign in April 2025, on the 79th anniversary of the birth of Vladimir Zhirinovsky, the party's founder and first leader. The party plans to build its election platform on a national patriotic ideology, focusing on anti-migrant and demographic themes, as well as support for the regions.

In October 2025, the Liberal Democratic Party convention was held, at which Leonid Slutsky was prematurely re-elected party leader (initially his term ended in May 2026). In addition, at the convention, Slutsky announced one of the party's goals to at least double the number of deputies in the State Duma following the election results.

On 23 June 2026, party convention took place in Ruza, Moscow Oblast. At the convention, the party approved its candidates list for the election. The party also adopted its election programme titled "100 Days of Transformation of Russia," aimed at addressing social issues. Key proposals include a "people's mortgage" at 3%, abolition of personal income tax on earnings up to 50,000 rubles, and pension indexation of at least 20%. Party leader Leonid Slutsky emphasized continuity with the ideas of the LDPR's founder, Vladimir Zhirinovsky. In total, the party's electoral list includes 435 candidates.

=== A Just Russia ===
At party's annual congress on 25 October 2025, A Just Russia – For Truth reverted to its pre-2021 name, A Just Russia. One of the reasons for the return was the de facto retreat of the former leaders of Patriots of Russia and For Truth from the party's leadership in recent years: Gennady Semigin resigned in 2024, and Zakhar Prilepin barely participated in the party leadership. Furthermore, Mironov stated that the acronym SRPZP offended him, "while everyone knows A Just Russia." The position of co-chairs, created in 2021 for Semigin and Prilepin, was abolished, as well as Semigin's and Prilepin's positions of Chairman of the Central Council and Secretary of the Chamber of Deputies. In their place, the positions of first deputy chairman of the party were created, with Alexander Babakov appointed, and two ordinary deputy chairmen, with Ruslan Tatarinov and Zakhar Prilepin appointed. Sergei Mironov was unanimously re-elected chairman.

On 4 July 2026, the convention of the party was held in Moscow. The convention approved the party list of candidates for the election, which was headed by the party leader Sergey Mironov. In total, the party nominated 263 candidates on the party list and 224 candidates in single-member constituencies. The media drew attention to the nomination of former Ukrainian Acting Prime Minister and National Bank Governor Serhiy Arbuzov on the party's list. In addition, the congress approved the party's election programme entitled "Manifesto of Justice". Also, out of the 27 current deputies from A Just Russia, the party nominated only 17 for election. A Just Russia did not nominate deputies who joined party when it merged with the parties For Truth (except Alexander Babakov) and Patriots of Russia. Among the current deputies, long-time party members were mostly nominated.

=== New People ===
In April 2024, the New People party merged with the Party of Growth.

In March 2026, the first part of the party's convention took place in Saint Petersburg, where the top three leaders of the federal list for the State Duma elections were approved: party leader Alexey Nechayev, Vladislav Davankov and Sardana Avksentyeva. The party's main goal was stated to be expanding its faction in the State Duma and strengthening its representation in the regions.

Before the New People party convention, media reports emerged about a possible expansion of the party list with experienced politicians who had previously been members of other major parties. Among them are Vasily Vlasov, who was formerly one of the closest associates of the Liberal Democratic Party founder Vladimir Zhirinovsky, Anastasia Pavlyuchenkova, who previously stepped down as head of the central apparatus of A Just Russia, and Maria Chuprina, a former assistant to ex-leader of Yabloko Sergei Mitrokhin.

On 1 July 2026, the party convention was held, at which 299 candidates for party list and 83 candidates for single-member constituencies were approved.

=== Party of Pensioners ===
On 26 June 2026, the convention of the Party of Pensioners was held in Moscow. The delegates unanimously approved the party list and the election programme. The party plans to compete for seats both on party lists and in 108 single-mandate constituencies. The federal part of the list includes party leader Erik Prazdnikov, three doctors, and a retired major general. Separately, the convention approved Andrey Svintsov, a State Duma deputy previously expelled from the Liberal Democratic Party, as the head of the regional list for the Moscow Oblast. He explained his decision by saying that this party now genuinely defends the rights of the majority of citizens. The foundation of the election campaign is the "Programme for a Normal Life," whose key points include affordable healthcare and dentistry, decent pensions, as well as support for families and young people.

=== Yabloko ===
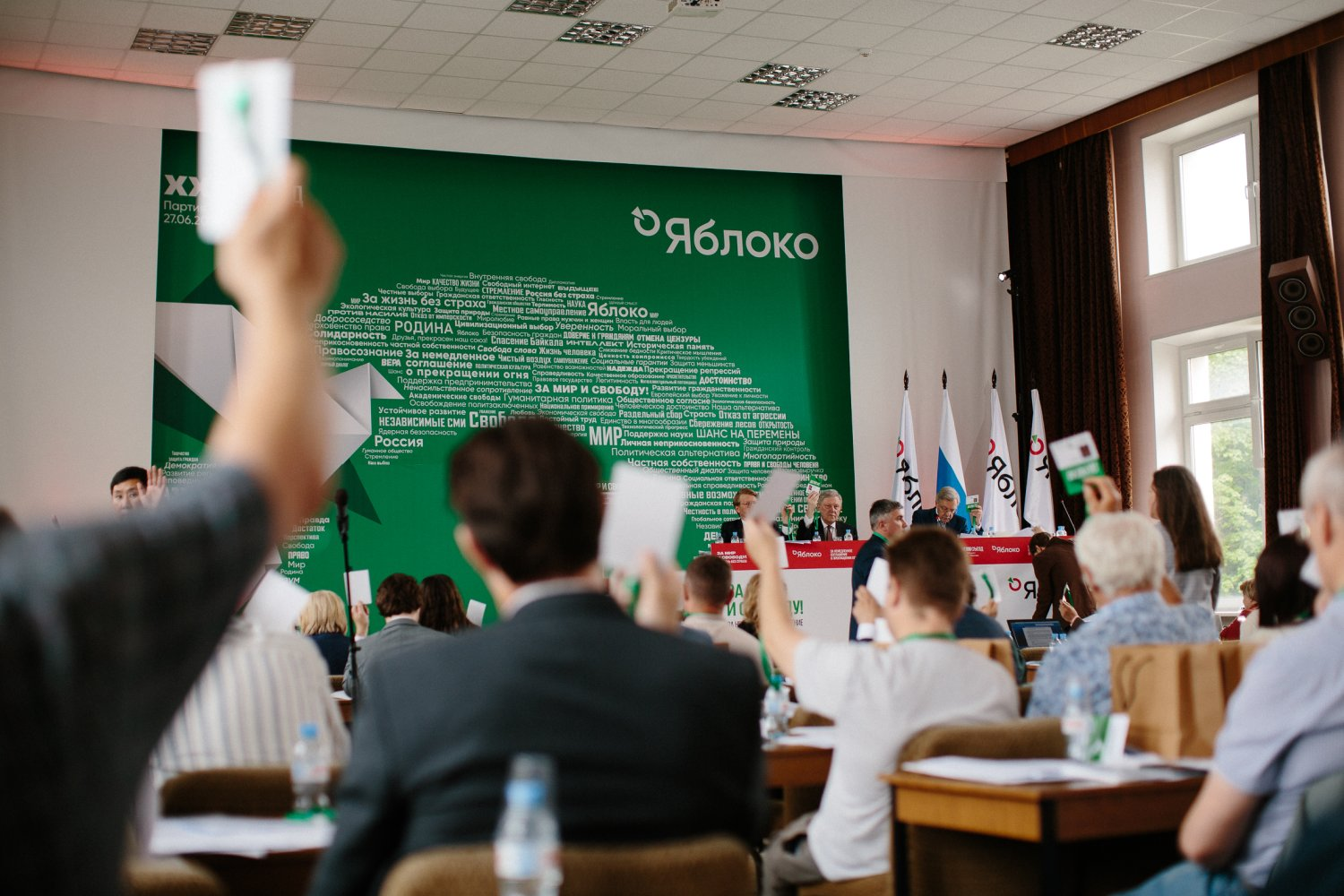
Yabloko party convention in Moscow under the "For Peace and Freedom" slogan, June 27, 2026

Yabloko remained the sole registered party to openly oppose the Russian war in Ukraine, openly agitating "For Peace and Freedom". The party planned to partake in the 2026 legislative election under this anti-war slogan.

Since the previous elections, 11 members of the party have become defendants in criminal cases, and 12 party members have been added to the register of foreign agents. Party members recognized as foreign agents, as well as those brought to administrative responsibility for the "demonstration of extremist symbols", have lost their right to participate in elections. Among them: party chairman Nikolay Rybakov, and his deputies Boris Vishnevskiy, Vladimir Dorokhov, and Lev Shlosberg. Another deputy of Rybakov, Maxim Kruglov, was sentenced to seven years in prison by the Zamoskvoretsky Court of Moscow on June 24, 2026, for publishing information on social media about civilian casualties in Ukraine during the Russian invasion, including in Mariupol and Bucha.

On 27 June 2026, the Yabloko convention was held, at which a party list of 275 candidates and 137 candidates for single-mandate constituencies were approved. The party list was headed by the leader of the Chelyabinsk regional branch of the party, lawyer Yaroslav Shcherbakov.

On 10 August 2026, the Supreme Court of Russia removed Yabloko from the ballot, following a lawsuit by the Rodina party. Yabloko officials state that they intend to appeal the ruling. Ultimately, Yabloko was barred from running for party-list seats in the State Duma, though it was allowed to run in constituencies and participate in some regional elections.

=== Rodina ===
In April 2026, the Rodina party held a convention at which a new leadership body was elected. The main point of intrigue at the congress was the possible joining of writer Zakhar Prilepin to the party and even his election as "ideological leader". However, Prilepin himself did not attend the event. Rodina leader Aleksey Zhuravlyov stated that the party would very much like to see Prilepin in its ranks, but the matter was postponed. At the same time, his associates were present at the congress, including Alexander Zaremba and Dmitry Shurov (who was also elected secretary of party's political council), and they expressed their readiness to jointly advance the patriotic agenda. Prilepin's possible joining of Rodina was expected ahead of the party's election convention.

On 28 June, the party's election convention took place, at which the party list was approved, comprising 15 people headed by Aleksey Zhuravlyov, as well as candidates for single-mandate constituencies. It also became known that Prilepin was absent from the congress and did not make it onto Rodina's candidate list for the election.

=== Communists of Russia ===
The Communists of Russia convention was held on 28 June 2026. Candidates from the party list and single-mandate constituencies were nominated at the congress. The party's election programme entitled "Communists for Victory and Soviet Power!" was also announced.

=== Party of Direct Democracy ===
The Party of Direct Democracy convention was held on 3 July 2026. The party's list and election programme were approved at the convention.

The electoral programme of the Direct Democracy Party, "Exactly Twelve," focuses on returning politics to the people through direct democracy and comprises three key pillars: protecting personal freedoms and civil rights (privacy, free speech, banning digital surveillance), social justice (transparent digital budget, dignified pensions, environmental quotas), and a strong, open state with fair elections, imperative mandates, and the implementation of blockchain technologies for voting and local self-government.

The Party of Direct Democracy became the only party in the 2026 election that refused to form the federal part of the list and formed it from only 40 regional groups. According to a statement on the party's website, this step is due to the party's refusal to use the "locomotive" technique in its nominations, which other parties use to attract votes by deceiving voters.

=== The Greens ===
In April 2026, The Greens merged with the Green Alternative party.

On 5 July 2026, the congress of the Green Party was held, at which 263 candidates on the party list and 135 candidates in single-member constituencies were approved. The party list was headed by member of the Legislative Assembly of Saint Petersburg, former leader of Saint Petersburg regional branch of A Just Russia party Marina Shishkina.

== Opinion polls ==
All opinion polls. Up to 95% polling results of the graph are sourced from pollsters affiliated to the president Putin and the Presidential Administration, notably FOM and VCIOM United Russia CPRF LDPR A Just Russia New People

Graph of independent, opposition and alleged closed Kremlin opinion polls. Consists of 31 Levada Center, 9 Russian Field, 4 CIPKR, 3 ACF, 3 ExtremeScan and 2 alleged closed Kremlin-ordered polls. United Russia CPRF LDPR A Just Russia New People Yabloko RPPSJ BLP

== Conduct ==
On the week of the election, a CEC employee was killed in a drone attack in Zaporizhzhia Oblast in occupied Ukraine. On the first day of voting, a polling station in Krasnodar Krai was relocated due to drone damage, while in Luhansk People's Republic, occupied Ukraine, 14 polling stations lost electricity following a drone attack on energy infrastructure. In Sochi, election workers and voters were forced to seek shelter due to an air raid alert. There were reports of widespread failures of electronic voting terminals in Moscow. Election officials in the city later said an online voting system had come under a cyberattack. Polling in Sochi was suspended on 19 September following another Ukrainian drone attack. On 20 September, the final voting day, Ukraine carried out its largest ever drone attack on the Moscow area. The Russian Ministry of Defense stated that over 1,900 drones, eight guided aerial bombs, eight cruise missiles and four other missiles had been shot down overnight.

== Results ==
United Russia easily triumphed in the elections, gaining more than three fourths of the seats in the State Duma. Several parties representing Russia's systemic opposition filled in the remainder of the seats, and a handful went to members without any party affiliation. Overall turnout was at 55.66%, with Moscow seeing a record high voter turnout according to the commission. Observers noted that in the absence of serious opposition parties, it was more of a question of how much rather than if United Russia would win. Some have stated that this will either lead to more drastic legislation being passed or Vladimir Putin using the legislature as a cover more often. Putin himself stated that the results indicated that the Russian people stood firmly behind the war in Ukraine. Ella Pamfilova, chairman of the Central Election Commission said that for the first time, veterans of the Russo-Ukrainian War who ran in the election won 46 to 49 seats.

Party	Party-list			Constituency			Total seats	+/–
Party	Votes	%	Seats	Votes	%	Seats	Total seats	+/–
United Russia	39,118,497	59.01	140			209	349	+25
Communist Party	9,051,776	13.66	32			5	37	–20
Liberal Democratic Party	5,970,578	9.01	21			2	23	+2
New People	5,253,202	7.92	19			0	19	+6
A Just Russia	3,589,806	5.42	13			4	17	–10
Party of Pensioners	1,286,329	1.94	0			0	0	0
The Greens	761,542	1.15	0			0	0	0
Communists of Russia	555,943	0.84	0			0	0	0
Rodina	469,972	0.71	0			1	1	0
Party of Direct Democracy	231,011	0.35	0			0	0	New
Yabloko						0	0	0
Independents						4	4	–1
Total	66,288,656	100.00	225			225	450	0
Valid votes	66,288,656	98.64						
Invalid/blank votes	913,571	1.36						
Total votes	67,202,227	100.00						
Registered voters/turnout	112,789,817	59.58		112,789,817	–			
Source: Central Election Commission of the Russian Federation

== Reactions ==
=== Domestic ===
United Russia chairman Dmitry Medvedev welcomed the party's preliminary performance and said that its next task was to implement President Vladimir Putin's policies and decisions.

Communist Party leader Gennady Zyuganov questioned the preliminary results in an interview with Channel One. He alleged that all of the party's election observers in Voronezh had been unlawfully removed and said that the party would compare its copies of polling-station protocols with the official results. He also said that practices associated with the "wild 1990s" had resurfaced during the campaign and disputed the accuracy of the results displayed by the electoral commission.

New People thanked its supporters and stated that more than five million citizens had cast their votes for the party in what it described as its largest electoral campaign to date. The party wrote on its Telegram that it would provide a complete assessment of the campaign following the final results.

Yabloko chairman Nikolai Rybakov claimed that the party would have finished second in the election had it not been disqualified. He described the campaign as political event of global significance that had demonstrated public support for peace and freedom. Ivan Bolshakov, head of Yabloko's analytical centre, criticized tactical voting for other parties to deprive United Russia of its majority, arguing that voting for any party on the ballot amounted to supporting Putin and the continuation of the war. Rybakov said that an influx of new supporters would lead the party to expand its activities, including its political education programmes, and invited supporters to submit proposals for its future work.

=== International ===
On 6 August, the Organization for Security and Co-operation in Europe (OSCE) criticized Russia for not inviting OSCE observers to the elections, noting that this "represents a serious breach of the commitments it has undertaken as an OSCE participating State".

On 21 September, the Council of the European Union described the election as "evidence of the 'continued and deepening erosion of democracy in Russia, taking place in an increasingly authoritarian political environment'. Albania, Andorra, Iceland, Liechtenstein, Moldova, Montenegro, North Macedonia, Norway, San Marino and Ukraine later aligned themselves with this assessment.

On 13 August, Ukraine's Ministry of Foreign Affairs stated that the results of the election in Russian-occupied Ukraine would be invalid because the vote was illegal, stating that the presence of a mission of international observers from post-Soviet states did not alter this fact and suggesting that their presence was a tool for Russia to attempt to legitimize the results. On 21 September, a joint statement by the governments of Australia, Canada, New Zealand, Norway and the United Kingdom declared elections in the occupied territories of Ukraine to be a sham.

The Ministry of Foreign Affairs of Moldova condemned Russia's intention to open polling stations in the Moldovan unrecognized breakaway region of Transnistria for the election, calling such a move, not coordinated with the Moldovan government, "unacceptable" and a violation of the country's sovereignty and territorial integrity. Vadim Krasnoselsky, the de facto president of Transnistria, had previously announced that Russia would open 17 polling stations in Transnistria for its 2026 legislative election. The Russian embassy in Chișinău had agreed with the Moldovan government the opening of uniquely one polling station, in Chișinău. According to the breakaway government, around 220,000 residents in Transnistria had Russian citizenship at the time. Five days later, Moldova's foreign ministry summoned Oleg Ozerov, the Russian ambassador to Moldova, and handed him a formal note of protest on 3 September, calling on Russia to refrain from opening polling stations in Transnistria for its own election.

Officials from Romania's Ministry of Foreign Affairs condemned on 18 September Russia's opening of polling stations for the election in Transnistria without the Moldovan government's consent, as well as the illegal holding of the election in the Russian-occupied territories of Ukraine, expressing Romania's support for the territorial integrity of both countries.

The Georgian government also condemned Russia's decision to open polling stations in the occupied territories of South Ossetia and Abkhazia.

== See also ==
- List of members of the 9th Russian State Duma
