= Northern Man =

Far-right political organisation in Russia

Northern Man Северный человек
- Leader: Vacant
- Founders: Misha Mavashi
- Founded: 25 November 2022
- Registered: 18 May 2022
- Membership (2024): 185,500 (claimed)
- Ideology: Russian nationalism; National conservatism; Cultural nationalism; Pan-Slavism; Anti-immigration; Islamophobia; Antiislamism; Patriotism
- Political position: Far-right
- Religion: Russian Orthodox Church
- Colours: Black, white
- Federation Council: 0 / 178
- State Duma: 0 / 450

Website
- северныйчеловек.рф

Northern Man (Russian: Северный человек, romanized: Severnyy chelovek) is a Russian nationalist, patriotic, Islamophobic and anti-immigrant political organization founded in 2022 by Russian rapper Misha Mavashi (real name Mikhail Nitz).

== Ideology ==
The stated goals of the organization are "consolidation of citizens based on the Slavic ethnicity," "popularization and preservation of traditional values," "patriotic education of youth," "support for physical and spiritual development," and assistance to Russian soldiers in Ukraine.

Northern Man has been described as adhering to far-right, Russian nationalist, national-conservative, Islamophobic, anti-immigrant views. Ideologically, Northern Man is close to Russian Community, with which it has an alliance.

== History ==
Misha Mavashi expressed the idea of creating the organization back in 2021, amid rising anti-migrant sentiments in Russia. The organization's stated start date is 25 November 2022, although it was already registered as an autonomous non-profit organization on 18 May 2022. The organization's name coincides with Mikhail Mavashi's song "Severny Chelovek" (Northern Man), which was posted in March 2021.

In April 2024, Northern Man joined the Ethno-Confessional Council under the Governor of Astrakhan Oblast as a representative of ethnic Russians. That same month, mayor of Vladivostok Konstantin Shestakov expressed solidarity with the organization's members in a pre-campaign for the launch of the city branch of the organization. The movement also collaborated with Governor of Vologda Oblast Georgy Filimonov, who is known for his ultra-conservative views.

Its founder and leader, Misha Mavashi, died on October 25, 2026, at the age of 41, for undisclosed causes.

=== Actions ===
In March 2023, Northern Man activists from the organization published a video in which a teenager from Perm apologized to "Russian Orthodox people" for burning an icon. Before this, the teenager was flogged.

In the spring of 2024, activists of the movement, together with the Russian Community, supported the protest against the construction of a mosque in the Kosino-Ukhtomsky District of Moscow.

In September 2024, Northern Man took part in the Orthodox fundamentalist procession along Nevsky Prospect together with the Russian Community and the Movement of Academists.

In November 2024, the organization filed a complaint with law enforcement about a rap artist's concert in Vladivostok, calling his work "antisocial," and successfully got the concert cancelled.

Members of the organization often act as people's druzhinas. In March 2025, members of Northern Man, together with the Russian Community, took under protection residents of the outskirts of Zelenograd who were receiving threats from a network of drug dens.

The organization also conducts sports training in various cities of Russia.

== Membership ==
During the first year, branches of Northern Man appeared in Perm, Lipetsk, Khabarovsk, Murom, Astrakhan and other cities of Russia. In early 2024, a branch appeared in Tyumen, which in September held a march in the city center, which the authorities did not approve but did not interfere with either. In February 2025, a branch of the organization appeared in Bratsk. In total, 45 branches of the organization have been declared in different cities of Russia. The organization's membership, according to its own statements, is about 185 thousand people.

== Criticism ==
In April 2024, MMA fighter Magomed Ismailov criticized Northern Man for the fact that a person of non-Slavic nationality cannot become a member of the organization.

== See also ==
- Movement Against Illegal Immigration
- Sorok Sorokov Movement
- Russian Community
- Male State
