= Russian Community =

Far-right political organisation in Russia

Russian Community Русская община
- Abbreviation: RO
- Leader: Andrei Tkachuk
- Founders: Andrei Tkachuk; Yevgeny Chesnokov; Andrei Afanasyev
- Founded: 29 December 2020
- Ideology: Russian nationalism; Orthodox fundamentalism; Anti-immigration; Islamophobia; Antiislamism; Caucasophobia; Homophobia; Anti-Western sentiment; Etatism
- Political position: Far-right
- Religion: Russian Orthodox Church
- Colours: Black, white
- Federation Council: 0 / 178
- State Duma: 0 / 450

Website
- obshinaru.ru

The Russian Community (Russian: Русская община, romanized: Russkaya obshchina; RO) is a Russian far-right nationalist political paramilitary organization founded in late 2020. It has been described as anti-Islamic, anti-immigrant, anti-Caucasian, and pro-government.

The Russian Community is known for its fight against immigrant workers in Russia. Chairman of the Investigative Committee of Russia, Alexander Bastrykin, is considered an unofficial patron of the organization. The organization has seen its heyday since 2022 Russian invasion of Ukraine. But even despite their pro-government orientation, activists of the Russian Community are often sentenced for criminal cases related to inciting ethnic hatred and hooliganism.

Despite its stated opposition to migrant workers only, the organization is also opposed to the indigenous Muslim peoples of Russia, in particular those from the North Caucasus. Other nationalist organizations cooperate with the Russian Community, including the Orthodox fundamentalist Sorok Sorokov Movement and the far-right Northern Man movement, founded by nationalist rapper Misha Mavashi.

== Ideology ==
According to its own statements, the Russian Community advocates for the "unification of Russians for all types of assistance to each other." One of the roots of ideology is the concept of survival collectives by a futurologist Igor Vasiliev (Semyon Reznichenko).

The organization supports the political course of the current Russian leadership, including Russian invasion of Ukraine and the crackdown on the anti-war opposition. The organization cooperates with law enforcement agencies; In particular, the head of the Investigative Committee, Alexander Bastrykin, known for his anti-immigrant position, is popular in the Russian Community and is considered by them an ally.

The Russian Community declares its fight against migrant workers in Russia, conducting joint raids with the police, including those in mosques, and reporting on events that, in their opinion, “do not correspond to traditional values,” as well as on people who displease the organization because of their ethnicity or behavior. In general, the organization's activities are similar to those of the Movement Against Illegal Immigration, banned in Russia in 2011.

In September 2024, a political action called the "March of Patriots" took place in Saint Petersburg, where one of the leaders of the organization, Andrei Tkachuk, called Muslims "Basurman scum." Tkachuk later accused the intelligence services of the United Kingdom of inciting discord in Russia, calling Russian Muslim bloggers Mansur Gneev and Zamir Khadzhimuratov their agents, who allegedly "set representatives of small nations against Russians and the Russian Community and against me personally."

== History ==
The Russian Community was founded in late 2020. The founders of the organization were Yevgeny Chesnokov, who previously coordinated the radical anti-abortion movement "For Life", pro-government journalist and former vice-speaker of the Omsk City Council Andrei Tkachuk, and Andrei Afanasyev, a journalist for the Orthodox fundamentalist TV channels Spas and Tsargrad. The Russian community developed from Andrey Tkachuk's COVID-19 dissident project, which was created in late 2020.

In 2023, the Russian Community spoke out against the construction of a mosque in the Kosino-Ukhtomsky District of Moscow. Members of the organization, together with other Orthodox activists, actively opposed the construction of the mosque, speaking under the slogan "We will not allow our places to be desecrated by a mosque."

Around 2024 some Russian federal subject of Russia started using Russian community's forces to perform basic policy duties due to increasing lack of police workers caused by intense recruitment of law enforcement to the Russian invasion of Ukraine.

The activities of the Russian Community also affect natives of the North Caucasus regions of the Russian Federation. In January 2024, the organization’s Telegram channel discussed a certain “black brigade of cones” that allegedly “seized the Tomsk Oblast.” The organization claimed that the Caucasians “behaved barbarically during the collection of cedar cones” and “kept the surrounding villages in fear.”

As of May 2025, the organization has about 650 thousand subscribers on its official Telegram channel and over a million subscribers on its YouTube channel. According to the list they published, the organization has 150 regional and city cells.

=== Raids and conflicts ===
In April 2024, the Russian Community succeeded in demolishing a mosque in Troitsk, adding that "there is still a lot of work ahead."

In August 2024, members of the Russian Community, together with city officials and police, raided street vendors in Yekaterinburg. The police subsequently detained the vendors, leaving their goods (fruits and vegetables) unattended. After their detention, members of the organization began distributing fruits and vegetables to passersby, who then began stealing them without the help of the community members. Journalists tried to convince the community members that distributing someone else's goods was theft. In turn, the police said that stealing from the counter was normal.

In early October 2024, members of the Russian Community carried out illegal raids on drug dealers in Tyumen. Subsequently, the activities of the Tyumen branch of the community were noticed by local police officers, but there were no consequences for the organization.

In October 2024, the Russian Community had a conflict with Boris-Mansur Gneev, an ethnic Russian who converted to Islam. A protocol was drawn up against Gneev, a 22-year-old native of Kuban, for inciting ethnic hatred and enmity because he criticized Andrei Tkachuk, the leader of the community. The alleged reason for the persecution of Gneev was his video about the Circassian genocide, in which he expressed regret that the majority of the inhabitants of Adygea are Russians, and not the indigenous population, who were exterminated. Earlier, in July of the same year, Community members surrounded the house of Gneev and his mother in the village of Khersonsky. Gneev's position on Christianity seemed offensive to the Community members, since in his videos Gneev called Christianity "illogical" and its dogmas unproven.

In December 2024, a conflict occurred between ethnic Chechens and members of the Russian Community in Saint Petersburg. According to the organization itself, the Chechens allegedly took the passport of a Russian army serviceman and then blackmailed him for money. The serviceman himself turned out to be a 45-year-old local resident, previously charged with intentional harm to health, who fought in the Russo-Ukrainian War as part of the Wagner Group, where he was recruited from a prison. At about five in the evening, on 1 December 2024, people in balaclavas entered the guard booth in order to find one of the participants in the incident, who, as it later turned out, quit in mid-November and returned to Chechnya. One of his colleagues was punched in the nose, and the second was slapped. The community members said that he had questions for "Gray", since he allegedly harassed a woman. As they left, the attackers identified themselves as members of the Russian Community.

In January 2025, the Russian Community succeeded in closing down the local Muslim religious community in Kotelniki, Moscow Region, and along with it, the prayer room. A criminal case was also opened against the leader of the Muslim community, Salavat Ibatullin, under the article of the Criminal Code of the Russian Federation on the creation of an illegal legal entity.

In February 2025, the Russian Community protested against the distribution of the As-Salam newspaper, which is printed in agreement with the Muftiate of Dagestan.

In March 2025, in Saint Petersburg, the Russian Community had a conflict with a native of Dagestan. According to the Community, the Dagestani person allegedly insulted the wife of a Russian soldier, a participant in the Russo-Ukrainian War. The woman complained about the insults to the community members, who later forced the man to apologize. At the same time, the Dagestani person himself was also a former soldier, a participant in the Ukraine war, demobilized for health reasons. He reported that the community members smashed his head and used pepper spray against him. "The video they posted is not true, they showed what suits them," the Dagestani person said regarding the video posted in the Community channels. The Community members themselves stated that the Dagestani threatened to kill the woman.

In April 2025, the Russian Community had a conflict with the Nogais in the village of Fyodorovsky, Surgut District, Khanty-Mansi Autonomous Okrug. The Nogais asked the Community members to remove the stickers with the organization's symbols, but the community members refused to do so, which led to the conflict.

In May 2025, in the town of Kameshkovo, Vladimir Oblast, a group of armed men with bats, brass knuckles, and knives attacked natives of Ingushetia, shouting nationalist slogans. The attack was reported by Adam Delimkhanov, a State Duma MP representing Chechnya, who said that eyewitnesses assessed the attack as "nationalistically motivated". Some channels indicated that the Russian Community was behind the attack, although Tkachuk, one of the Community's leaders, denied the organization's involvement in the attack.

== Reactions ==
Vera Alperovich, an expert at the SOVA Center, believes that the Russian Community verbally states that it has nothing against Russian citizens of other nationalities ("non-Russians"). "But this is theoretical. They emphasize that they have no complaints and are ready to interact with the peoples inhabiting Russia. They seem to have no questions for Chechens, Ingush, Dagestanis and other citizens of the Russian Federation," Alperovich noted. But, as Alperovich also believes, in practice, Russian citizens who profess Islam, in particular, natives of the North Caucasus, are also subjected to harassment by the Russian Community.

== Court cases ==
In May 2024, the court arrested six members of the "Russian Community" who came to a school in the village of Koysug, Azovsky District, Rostov Oblast earlier in April in search of "non-humans" and blocked it. The incident was caused by a conflict on ethnic grounds between a student and a teacher of Russian language and literature.

In August 2024, in Saint Petersburg, a native of Tajikistan called members of the Russian Community to resolve a conflict with a rival taxi driver from Dagestan. The participants in the conflict were taken to the police, and subsequently ten members of the Russian Community were found guilty of petty hooliganism and administratively arrested.

In October 2024, the Chechen Human Rights Regional Commissioner Mansur Soltayev asked the police and the prosecutor's office to conduct an investigation into the activities of the Russian Community. According to Soltayev, the organization works for foreign intelligence services with the aim of inciting ethnic hatred in Russia.

On May 6, 2025, searches were conducted in Vsevolozhsk, Leningrad Oblast at the home of representatives of the Russian Community in connection with a case of causing death by negligence. Earlier, on 3 May 2025, Community members, posing as police, broke into an apartment in a building on Leningradskaya Street. According to investigators, the activists broke down the door and used a gas canister and a stun gun against the tenant. There were also two guests in the apartment - a man and a woman who barricaded themselves in one of the rooms. When the community members tried to break down the door, the man set fire to the furniture, as a result of which he died, and the woman who was with him jumped out of the window, receiving serious injuries.

On 28 May 2025, three members of the Russian Community in Kovrov, Vladimir Oblast were taken into custody. According to investigators, on May 25, they took another member of the Community to the forest, tied his hands with tape, put a bag over his head and beat him for at least three hours, and also used a stun gun. In addition to beatings and torture, after the abduction, the victim was threatened with rape with a rubber truncheon and murder. The Investigative Committee of the Russian Federation has charged the suspects with kidnapping a person committed by a group of persons by prior agreement with the use of violence.

== See also ==
- Freikorps
- Sturmabteilung
- Movement Against Illegal Immigration
- Sorok Sorokov Movement
- Northern Man
- Soldiers of Odin
