= For the Family (political party) =

For the Family За семью
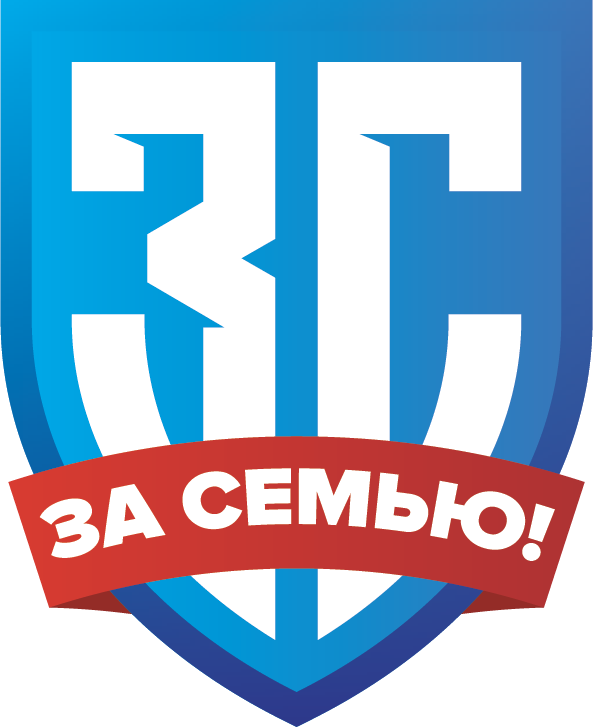
- Abbreviation: ZS
- Leader: Andrei Kormukhin
- Founder: Andrei Kormukhin
- Founded: 25 March 2023
- Ideology: Orthodox fundamentalism Social conservatism Russian conservatism Conservative Christianity; Christian right
- Political position: Far-right
- Religion: Russian Orthodox Church
- National affiliation: Sorok Sorokov Movement
- Colours: Blue; Red
- Slogan: «For the Faith!» (Russian: «За веру!»)

Website
- partyazasemyu.ru

The For the Family (Russian: За семью, romanized: Za sem'yu; ZS) is a Russian Orthodox-traditionalist party founded by Andrey Kormukhin, leader of the Sorok Sorokov Movement, on 25 March 2023.

== History ==
=== Foundation ===
12 March 2023 at the conference of the initiative groups of Moscow and the Moscow Oblast of the traditionalist movement "For the Family!" voted unanimously for the establishment of the Russian traditionalist political party of the same name. At the conference, it was noted that the members of the movement "consider it most important at the present stage at the legislative level to promote the strengthening of the positions of the traditional large family".

On 13 March, the initiative to create a party was supported by the Russian Orthodox Church.

On 25 March 2023, the founding congress of the party was held. The congress was attended by 300 delegates from 57 regions of the country. Andrey Kormukhin, the coordinator and founder of the Sorok Sorokov Movement, was elected chairman of the party. The political council included, in particular, Vladimir Krupennikov — United Russia deputy of the State Duma of the 5th, 6th, 7th convocations, war correspondent Anastasia Mikhailovskaya, retired Foreign Intelligence Service general Leonid Reshetnikov, political scientist Vladimir Samoilov, journalist Anna Shafran.

In September 2023, the party submitted documents for registration to the Ministry of Justice of Russia, but was refused.

== Party program ==
Laws protecting motherhood, traditional spiritual and moral values, a stable independent Russian economy, healthcare-oriented medicine, de-urbanization and development of abandoned territories — these and other issues were included in the party program.
