= Male State =

Far-right men's movement in Russia

Male State Мужское государство
- Abbreviation: MG
- Leader: Vladislav Pozdnyakov
- Founded: October 2016
- Banned: 18 October 2021
- Headquarters: Moscow, Russia
- Ideology: National patriarchy; Russian ultranationalism; Antifeminism; Homophobia; Anti-immigration; Anti-Ukrainian sentiment; Antisemitism
- Political position: Far-right
- Colours: Black; White

Party flag

Male State (MG; Russian: Мужское государство, romanized: Muzhskoye gosudarstvo) is an extremist and unofficial Russian men's movement that advocates patriarchy and far-right. The group's activities focus on online harassment: community members insult, bully and threaten women, black people, people in interracial relationships, and LGBT people.

The group was created by Vladislav Pozdnyakov in 2016 as a private community on the social network VKontakte. In 2020, the Male State community was blocked by VKontakte for "incitement to violent action". In 2021, a Russian court banned the group as extremist, stating that it incited hatred against women.

== Activities ==
The group advocates patriarchy, Russian nationalism and radical information warfare against the current government (Male State claims that Russia's current leaders are too pro-women). The group's activities are concentrated mainly on the Internet: members locate people (usually women) who express feminist or gay-friendly views on social media and target them with insults and threats of beatings or murder. The group has also held periodic in-person meetings, during which members learned hand-to-hand combat and pneumatic weapons use. Some members have identified the Liberal Democratic Party of Russia (LDPR) as their political partner.

== History ==
Male State began as a private community on the Russian social media network VKontakte. It was created in 2016 by the Russian bodybuilder Vladislav Pozdnyakov and maintained strict membership rules.

In December 2018, Pozdnyakov was sentenced to a two-year suspended sentence under Article 282 of the Criminal Code of the Russian Federation for "actions aimed at humiliating human dignity in relation to women". A year later, the sentence was overturned due to the partial decriminalization of the article under which he was previously convicted.

In 2019, four members of the Male State from Khabarovsk, detained in 2017, were convicted of extremist activities.

In 2020, the Male State community was blocked by the VKontakte administration for "incitement to violent action". By the time of blocking, the group consisted of over 150 thousand users. After the blocking of Male State and two more of his communities on VKontakte, Pozdnyakov began to actively maintain his channel on Telegram, a messaging service, and has garnered more than 80 thousand subscribers.

In July 2021, Pozdnikov was accused of leading a hate campaign against the Russian wife of a Nigerian student who had drowned while rescuing a swimmer in Kaliningrad Oblast.

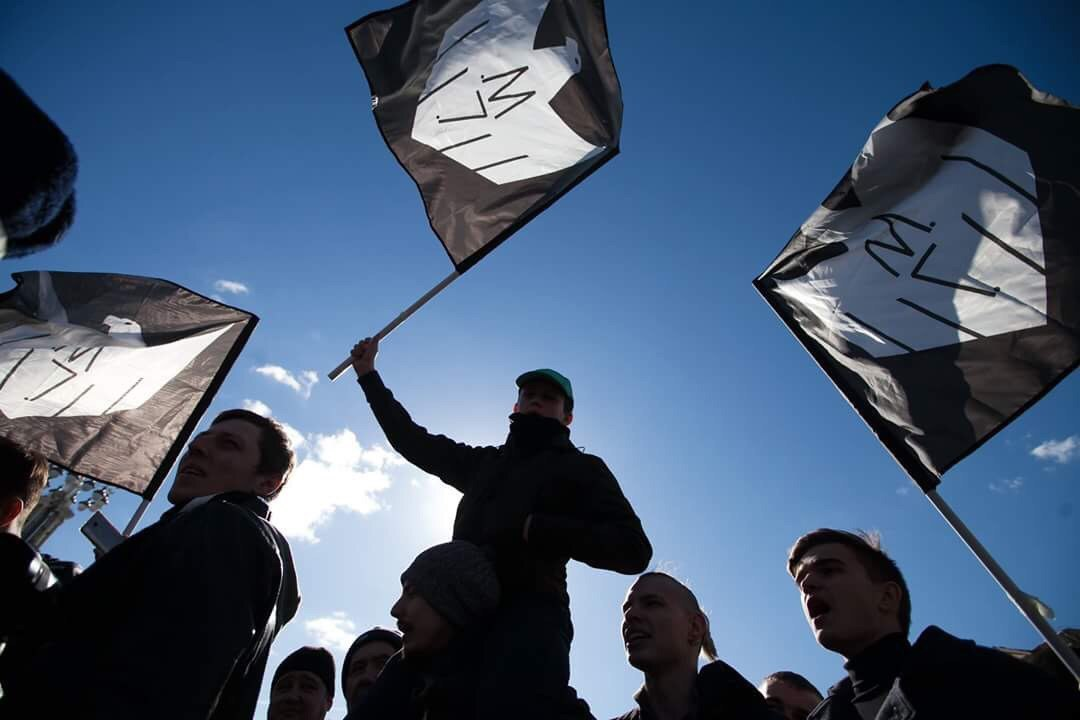
Male State activists at a rally in Moscow in 2017

In August 2021, Yobidoyobi co-founder Konstantin Zimen said he and his business received a barrage of threats and abuse after Vladislav Pozdnyakov shared a Yobidoyobi ad featuring a black man on his social media pages and called for action to be taken. The company took down the ad and apologized.

On 18 October 2021, the Nizhny Novgorod regional court declared the organization extremist, thus banning its activities in Russia.

On 4 August 2022, Male State and sympathizers targeted Dedaena Bar in Tbilisi because pro-Putin Russians are banned, posting thousands of negative reviews and hacking their website.

== See also ==
- Northern Man
