= 34th Congress of the Liberal Democratic Party of Russia =

2022 political party leadership election

2022 Liberal Democratic Party of Russia leadership election
- 27 May 2022

86 delegates 44 delegates votes needed to win
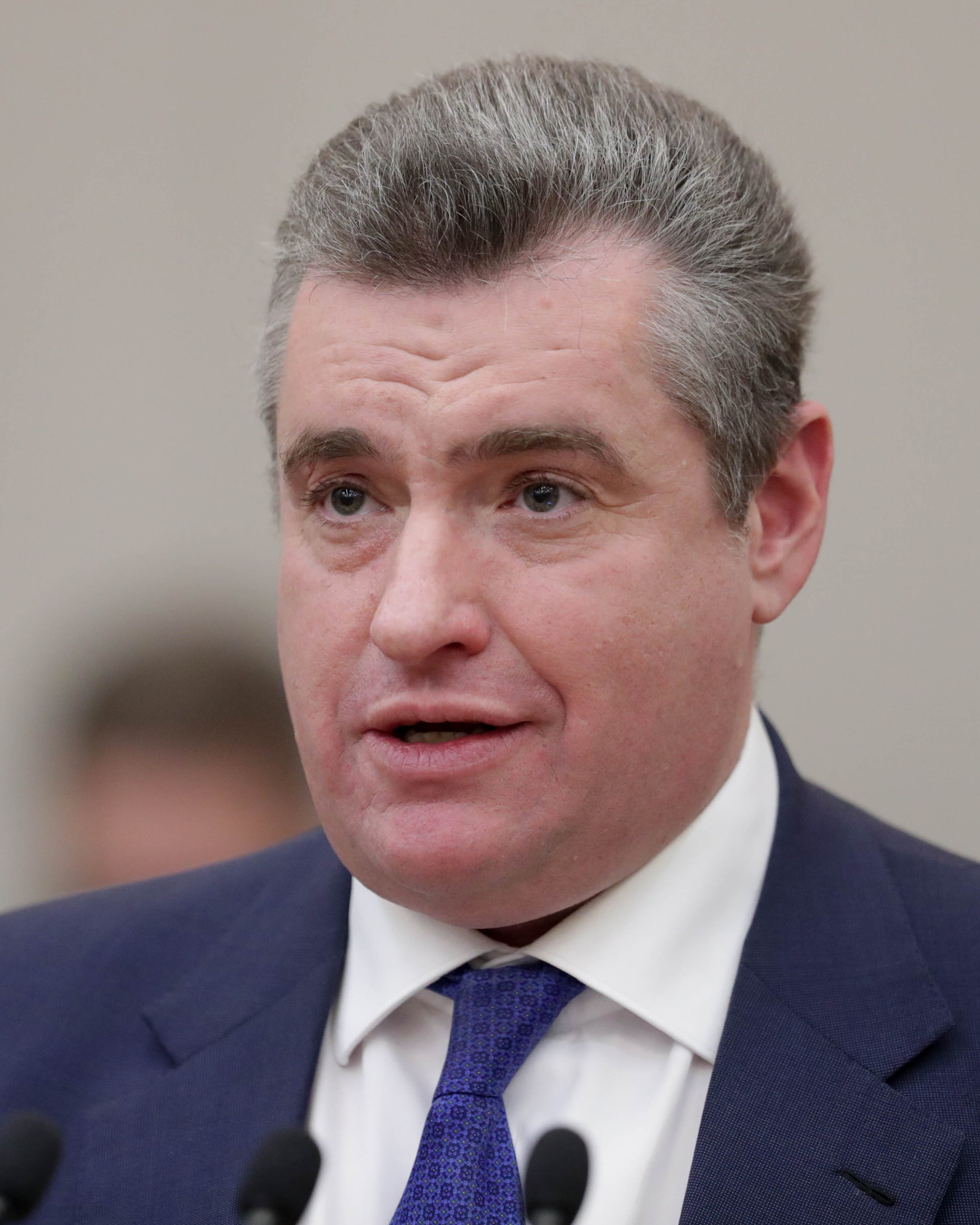
| Candidate | Leonid Slutsky |
| Party | LDPR |
| Delegate count | 86 |
| Percentage | 100% |
Party leader before election
Vladimir Zhirinovsky
Elected Party leader
Leonid Slutsky

The 34th Congress of the Liberal Democratic Party of Russia was held on 27 May 2022 to elect a new party leader, after the death of Vladimir Zhirinovsky.

The congress was held to elect a new leader of the Liberal Democratic Party after the death of its long-time leader Vladimir Zhirinovsky. Leonid Slutsky was elected as new party leader.

== Background ==
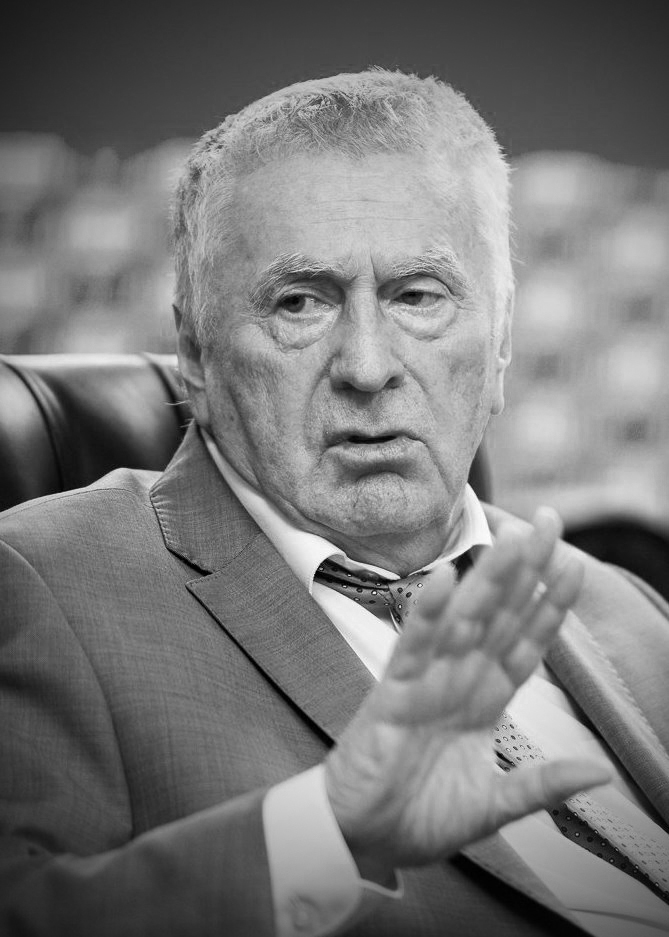
Vladimir Zhirinovsky died on 6 April 2022

Since the founding of the party in 1989, its permanent leader was Vladimir Zhirinovsky. Zhirinovsky was the party's presidential candidate in almost all elections (except the 2004 election), and headed the party's list in all federal parliamentary elections, and also always headed the party's lists in all regional parliamentary elections.

In February 2022, Zhirinovsky was hospitalized in critical condition in Moscow with COVID-19. In March, he was reportedly placed in a medically induced coma, and underwent treatment for COVID-19 complications such as sepsis and respiratory failure. Zhirinovsky claimed to have been vaccinated against COVID-19 eight times.

On 25 March 2022, Zhirinovsky was reported to have died in a hospital. Despite confirmation from several sources, including his own political party, the news was quickly denied by family members. On 6 April 2022, Vyacheslav Volodin, the Speaker of the Duma, announced that Zhirinovsky had died following a long illness. He was 75. In a statement after Zhirinovsky died, President Vladimir Putin said he "always defended his patriotic position and Russia's interests before any audience and in the fiercest of debates". Putin and other politicians including Sergey Shoygu and Vyacheslav Volodin attended Zhirinovsky's funeral which was officiated by Patriarch Kirill of Moscow.

== Candidates ==
=== Nominated candidate ===
On 26 May 2022, the Supreme Council of the Liberal Democratic Party nominated Leonid Slutsky to the post of chairman of the party. Slutsky's nomination was supported by all 85 regional branches of the party. Slutsky became the only nominated candidate.

Nominated candidate
Leonid Slutsky

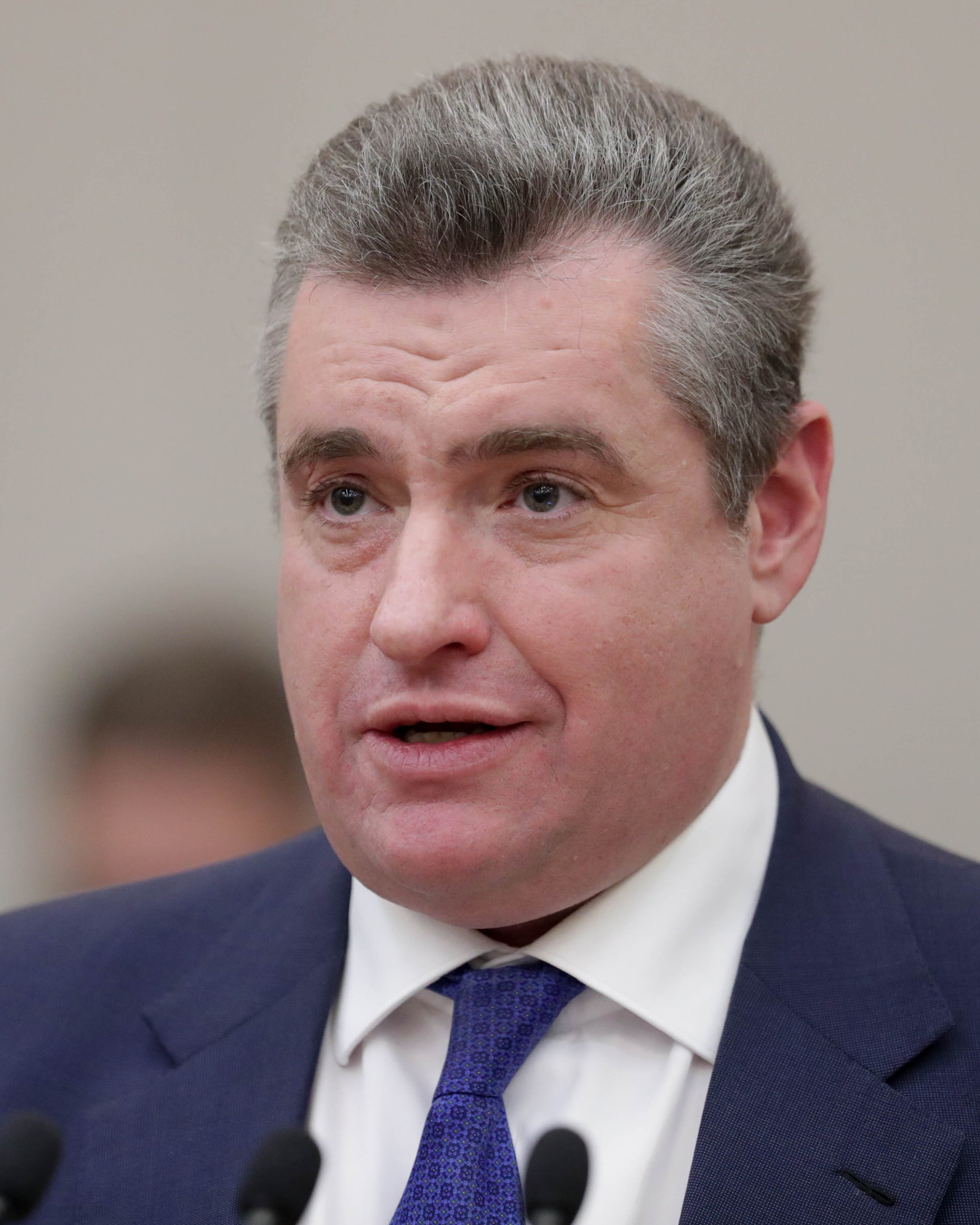

Member of the State Duma
(1999–present)

=== Other declared candidates who were not included in the ballots ===
Two more party members announced before the congress their intention to participate in the election of the party's leader, but were not included in the voting ballots.

| Portrait | Name | Offices held | Announcement date |
|---|---|---|---|
| | Vitaly Zolochevsky (born 1986) | Member of the State Duma (2012–2016) | 16 May 2022 |
| | Alexander Sherin (born 1977) | Member of the State Duma (2014–2021) | 16 May 2022 |

=== Speculative candidates who did not run ===
After Zhirinovsky's death, assumptions about candidates for the post of the new party leader began to appear in the media.

- Boris Chernyshov, member of the State Duma, deputy chair of the State Duma;
- Alexei Didenko, member of the State Duma, chair of the State Duma Committee on Regional Policy and Local Government, First Deputy Head of the Central Office of the party;
- Igor Lebedev, former member of the State Duma, son of Vladimir Zhirinovsky;
- Andrey Lugovoy, member of the State Duma;
- Yaroslav Nilov, member of the State Duma, chair of the State Duma Committee on Labour, Social Policy and Veterans' Affairs;
- Alexey Ostrovsky, Governor of Smolensk Oblast;
- Boris Paykin, member of the State Duma;
- Dmitry Rogozin, CEO of the Roskosmos, former Deputy Prime Minister, former member of the State Duma, former leader of the Rodina party (not party member);
- Vasily Vlasov, member of the State Duma.
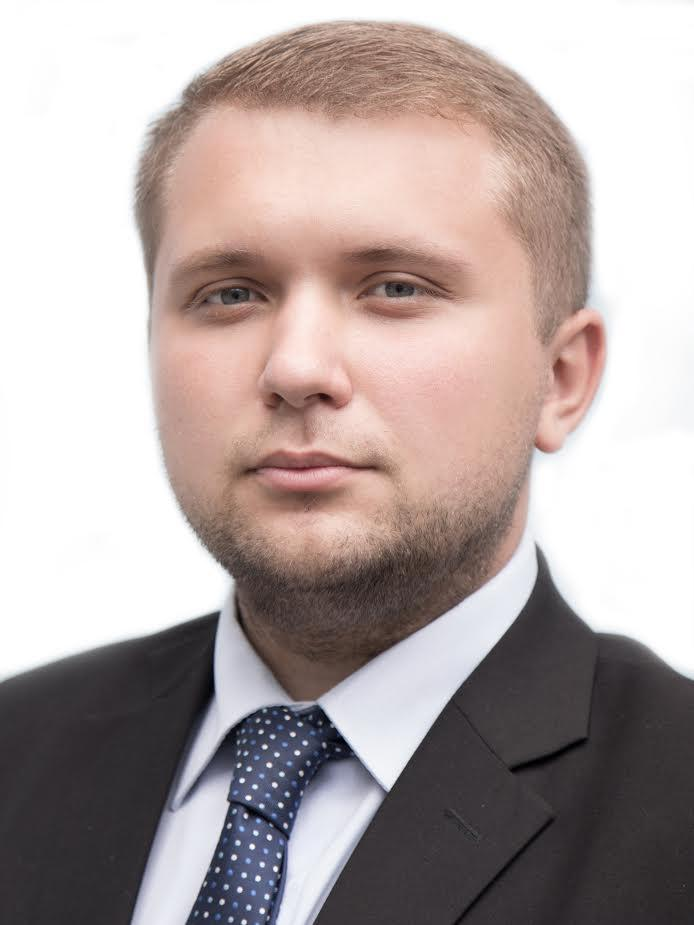
member of the State Duma
Boris Chernyshov

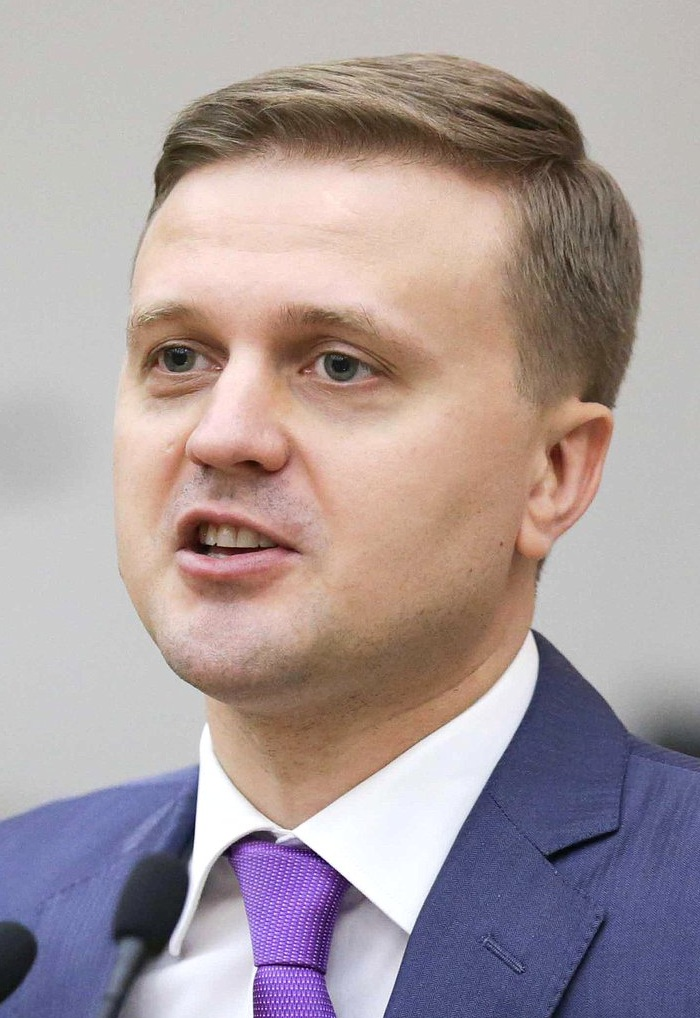
member of the State Duma
Alexei Didenko

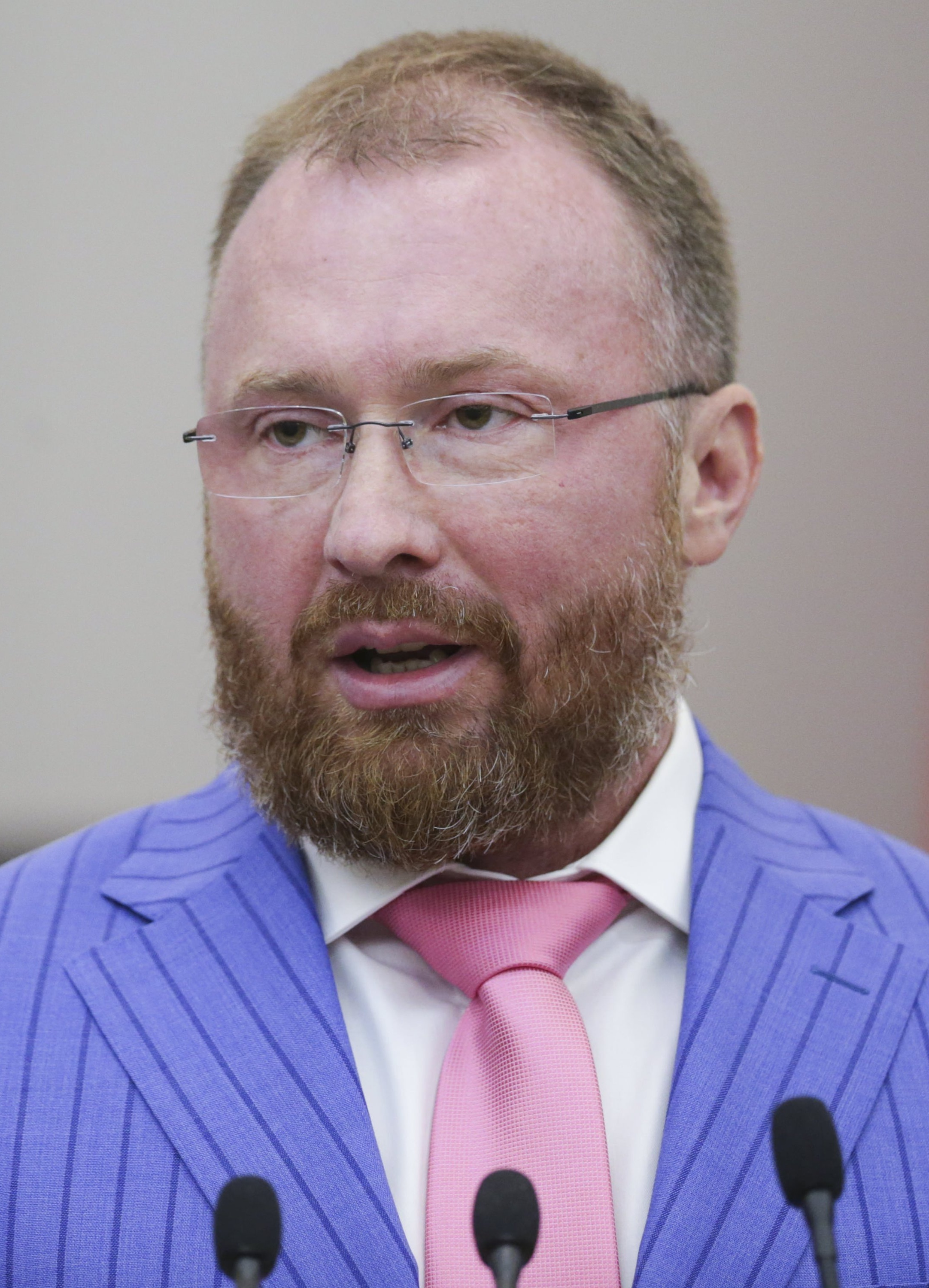
former member of the State Duma
Igor Lebedev

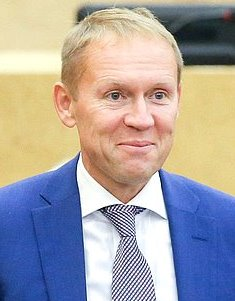
member of the State Duma
Andrey Lugovoy

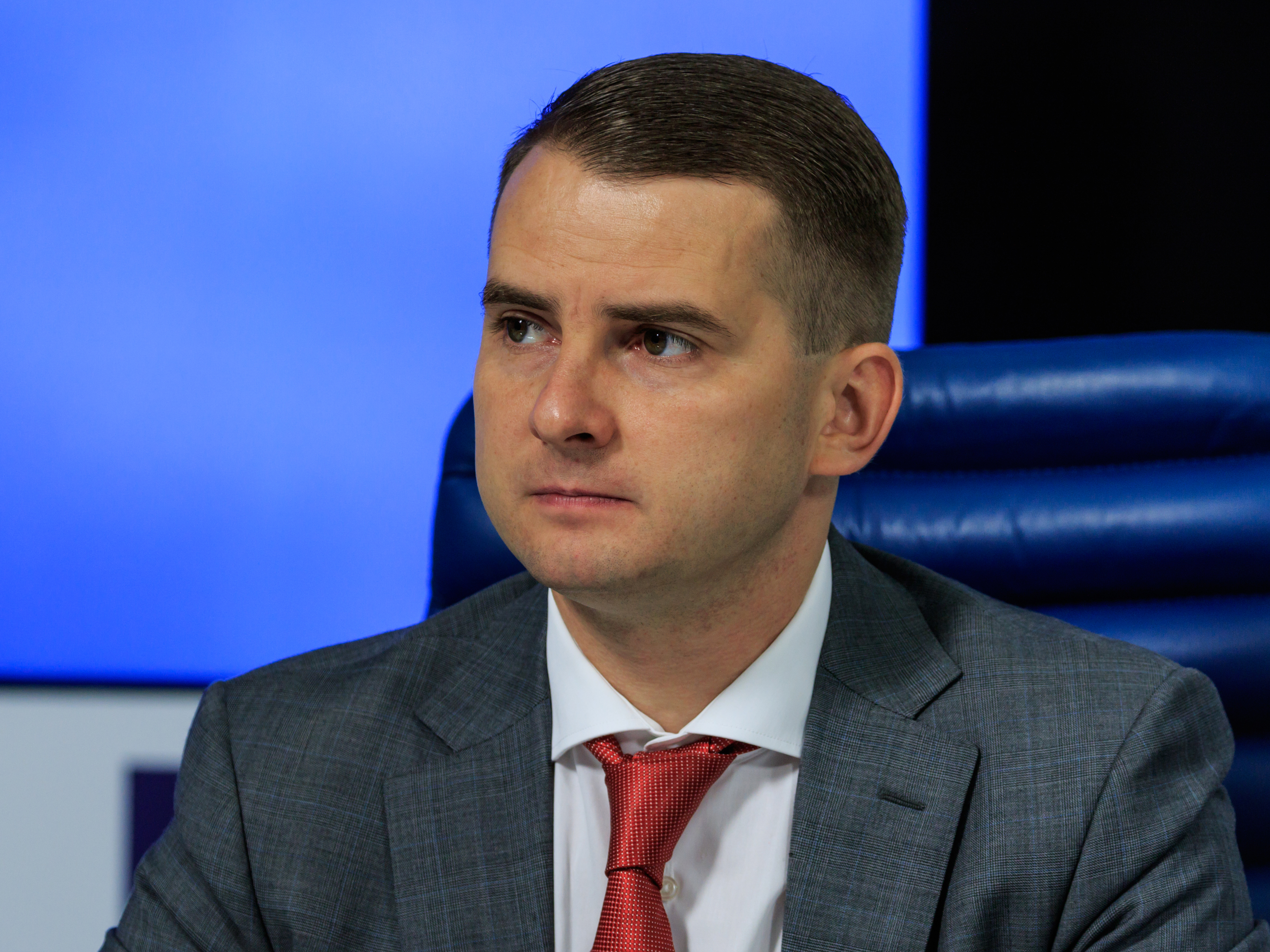
member of the State Duma
Yaroslav Nilov

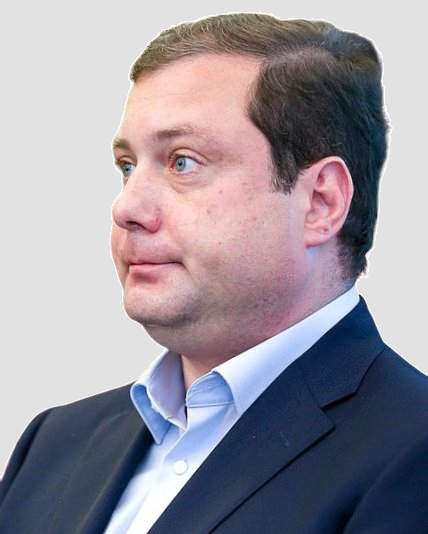
Governor
Alexey Ostrovsky

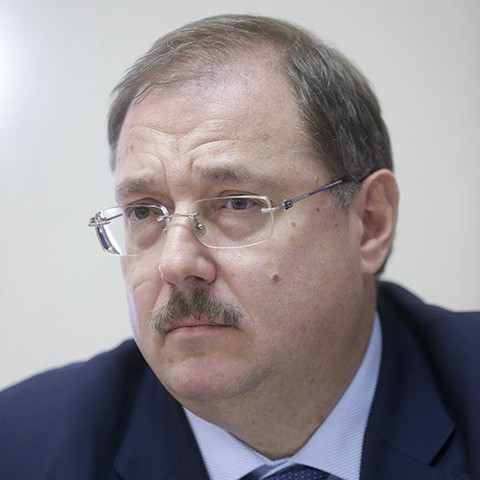
member of the State Duma
Boris Paykin

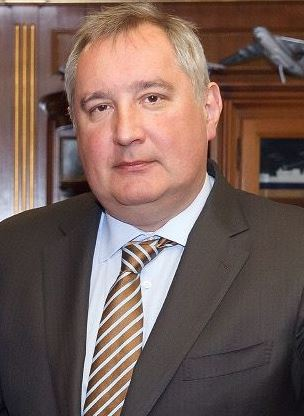
CEO of the Roskosmos
Dmitry Rogozin

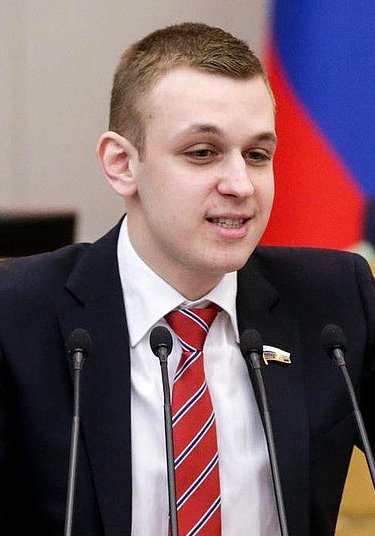
member of the State Duma
Vasily Vlasov

=== Declined to be candidates ===
The individuals in this section have been the subject of speculation about their possible candidacy, but have publicly denied interest in running.

- Mikhail Degtyarev, Governor of Khabarovsk Krai, former member of the State Duma (endorsed Slutsky);
- Vladimir Solovyov, journalist (not party member).

== Result ==
34th Congress of the Liberal Democratic Party of Russia
| Candidate | Votes | % |
|---|---|---|
| Leonid Slutsky | 86 | 100% |
| Against | 0 | 0% |
| Did not vote | 0 | 0% |
| Total | 86 | 100% |
