= Sorok Sorokov Movement =

Russian Christian nationalist movement

Sorok Sorokov Movement Движение «Сорок сороков»
- Abbreviation: DSS
- Leader: Andrei Kormukhin
- Founders: Andrei Kormukhin, Vladimir Nosov
- Founded: 1 July 2013
- Headquarters: Moscow, Schelkovskoe highway 2, k.A
- Membership (2017): ~200 active members, ~10,000 supporters
- Ideology: Orthodox fundamentalism; Conservative traditionalism; Russian conservatism; Conservative Christianity; Christian right; Social conservatism; Russian nationalism
- Political position: Far-right
- Religion: Russian Orthodox Church
- Affiliated political party: For the Family
- Colours: Maroon; Black

Website
- www.soroksorokov.ru

The Sorok Sorokov Movement (Russian: Движение «Сорок сороков», romanized: Dvizheniye "Sorok sorokov"; DSS) is a Russian Orthodox-traditionalist nationalist radical social movement founded on 1 June 2013. It was created by Andrei Kormukhin (brother of singer Olga Kormukhina) and athlete Vladimir Nosov. Its main activity is the protection of the construction of churches, religious processions and other church events.

== History ==
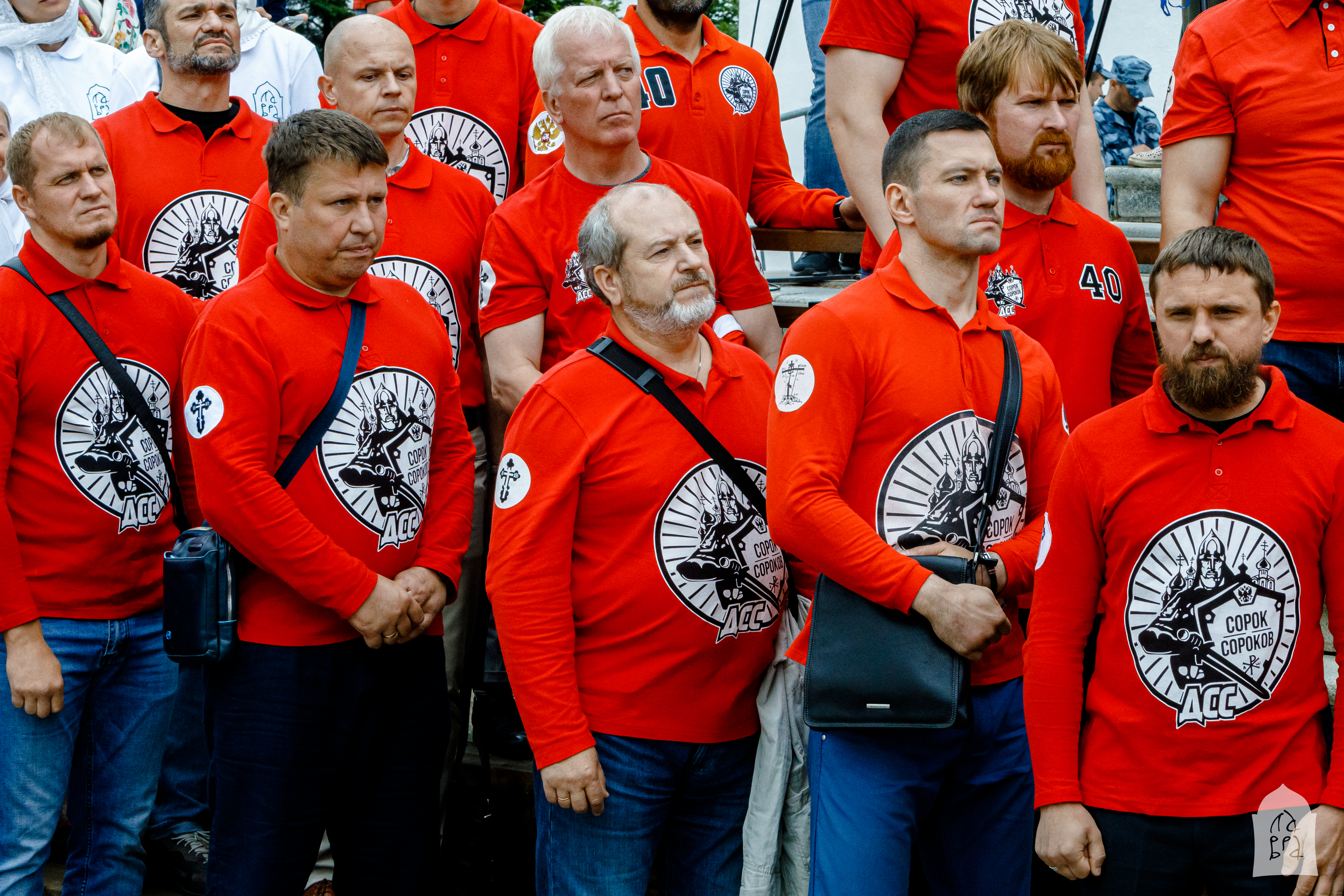
Members of the movement at the celebrations in honor of the 600th anniversary of finding the relics of St. Sergius of Radonezh in the Trinity-Sergius Lavra. 18 July 2022

In 2012, after the scandal and the Pussy Riot criminal case, a number of well-known church figures, such as Vsevolod Chaplin, publicly supported the proposal to create Orthodox squads in order to protect religious places from persons "carrying out blasphemous acts".

The former "Moloth" (Russian: «Молот») movement was created on 1 June 2013 by self-proclaimed composer Andrei "Moloth" Kormukhin and his fellow athletes at the moment when they "faced opposition to the construction of churches in Moscow", and then was renamed to "Sorok Sorokov". According to Kormukhin, not everyone "liked" the program for the construction of Orthodox churches in Moscow: "When the builders began to attack the builders, set dogs on them, insult the priests, we realized that it was time for us to say our word". In addition, the movement was created as "a response to the 2012 information campaign against the Russian Orthodox Church and the Pussy Riot scandal." At that moment in time, the movement saw itself primarily as a defender of new temple construction within the framework of the ROC's "200 Churches" program, but was not limited to this.

In particular, members of the movement accompanied the Gift of the Magi in Moscow, Saint Petersburg, Volgograd and Kyiv. The trip to Kyiv took place at the height of the Euromaidan, from 24 to 30 January 2014. It turned out to be especially memorable: in contrast to Moscow, where two thousand policemen provided protection for the shrine and pilgrims, in Kyiv the authorities assigned only 25 policemen. Igor Girkin, little known at that time, also participated in the protection of the shrine along with members of the movement.

== Analysis ==
Religious scholar Roman Lunkin regards the appearance of the Sorok Sorokov Movement as a bright event in Russian public life. According to him, the movement combines "the defense of biblical values with criticism of liberalism and anti-Western conspiracy theories." In addition, he notes that it has become, unlike some other smaller movements (such as God's Will, the Union of Orthodox Citizens), "a really functioning democratic social force", "a manifestation of civic activism, grassroots democracy", and considers that there are no more similar "religious socio-political movements in Russia".

== See also ==
- Russian Community
- For the Family (political party)
