= Yury Khovansky =

Russian vlogger, comedian and rapper (born 1990)

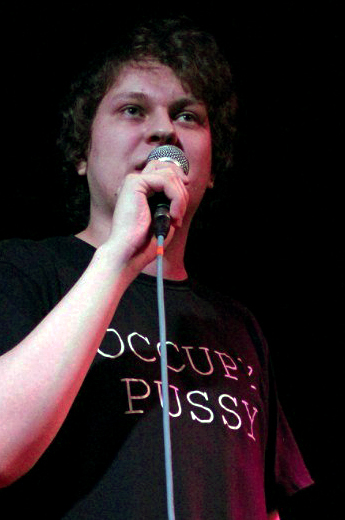
- Khovansky in 2014
- Born: Yury Mikhaylovich Khovansky; 19 January 1990 (age 36); Nikolsk, Penza Oblast, USSR
- Occupations: Comedian; Rapper; YouTuber

YouTube information
- Channel: Юрий Хованский
- Years active: 2011–present
- Genres: Stand-up comedy; Podcast; Vlog; Music videos
- Subscribers: 4.28 million
- Views: 1.19 billion
- Last updated: 2 September 2024
- Website: www.khovansky.info

Yury Mikhaylovich Khovansky (Russian: Юрий Михайлович Хованский, born 19 January 1990) is a Russian video blogger, comedian, rapper and former Assistant Deputy to State Duma member Vasily Vlasov.

== Biography ==
Khovansky became interested in music during his childhood and played the bass guitar in amateur rock bands. After high school, his parents wanted him to enter the Saint Petersburg State University of Engineering and Economics, but his application was declined. Subsequently, he studied programming at the Saint-Petersburg State University of Economics, but quickly realized that this career did not suit him and dropped out. He finally performed successfully at another university and completed his education.

Before starting his YouTube channel, Khovansky worked as a promoter, a waiter, and a courier.

In the summer of 2017, Khovansky was physically assaulted by a friend of producer Kirill Kalashnikov, allegedly because Khovansky declined an invitation from Kalashnikov. At the police station, Khovansky was offered the option of resolving the matter personally.

On 9 June 2021 he was detained in St. Petersburg in a criminal case under Article 205.2 of the Criminal Code of the Russian Federation (public justification of terrorism). He pleaded guilty for all charges. On June 10, he was placed in a pre-trial detention center until his trial scheduled on August 8.

== Internet career ==
Khovansky was motivated by professional dissatisfaction to create his YouTube channel in September 2011. Initially, he uploaded videos of foreign stand-up comedians with his own Russian translations. His subsequent videos centered around comedic and satirical takes on current social problems and personal reflections. His YouTube projects include a series of humorous songs called That guy with the guitar (Russian: Этот парень с гитарой; Etot paren' s gitaroy) and four seasons of Russian Stand-up. Khovansky also collaborated on videos with renowned YouTuber Ilya Maddyson.

Khovansky later recorded and uploaded satyrical music videos in the gangster-rap form to YouTube. His first album My gangsta was released in 2017, and he is currently a judge on the rap battle show Versus Battle.

== Arrest and jailing ==
On 10 June 2021, Khovansky was arrested and charged with supporting terrorism with a song pertaining to the Nord-Ost Hostage Crisis, a Chechen terrorist event in 2002. The song was recorded during a livestream and uploaded to YouTube. The song contains lyrics about wishing more Russian children would perish at the hands of Chechen terrorists.

After his arrest, Khovansky partially submitted to the charges against him and requested house-arrest or a select activities ban. The Dzerzhinsky District Court rejected his request and put him in pre-trial detention due to concerns that he may continue engaging in harmful behaviors.

According to a criminal investigation conducted by the Main Investigative Directorate of the Investigative Committee of Russia, the courts noted that because of his on-screen performativity and glamourizing of the song, he was supporting the "public justification of terrorism and its propaganda." For breaching Part 2 of Article 205.2 of the Criminal Code of Russia, he was sentenced to two months in incarceration.

Khovansky's position as an Assistant Deputy to Vasily Vlasov within the Liberal Democratic Party of Russia (LDPR) was rescinded with a public announcement LDPR's Press Secretary Alexander Dyupin.

After his incarceration, Khovansky wrote a letter to his friend Ilya Davydov about his treatment within the pre-trial detention facility. He noted that hygiene was nearly impossible and that the only books available were of low literary quality but that the overall conditions were fair. He also stated that prior to his arrest, he was a supporter of Putin.

On 7 August 2021 the Kuibyshevsky District Court of St. Petersburg announced that they would be extending Khovansky's detention until 8 September due to concerns about Khovansky deleting media and evidence related to the case if released. He was released from detention on 29 December 2021, and the court closed the criminal case due to a statute of limitations on 20 July 2022 .

=== Follow-up apology ===
On 23 July 2021 The Flow reported that Khovansky had written an apology for his involvement with the song which was published on VKontakte by his friend Ilya Davydov early in the morning. In the letter, Khovansky apologized for the song and to those offended by the song's contents and themes.

"I understand that my song is disgusting and has no excuse. This song is my terrible mistake. Most of all I would like this song never to exist. I offer my deepest apologies to everyone for singing this song,"

=== Primary accuser ===
The call for legal action against Khovansky was instigated by Vladislav Pozdnyakov, founder of the Russian jingoist "Мужское государство" [Men's State] movement, a group dedicated to promoting traditionally patriarchal and conservative values. As reported by The Flow, the proceedings against Khovansky began in February when Pozdnyakov reported him to the Ministry of Internal Affairs.

On 9 June 2021 Pozdnyakov wrote on his VKontakte page, "[a] good thousand denunciations to all the various bodies of the faggot," expressing pride over the arrest.

He continues to state that the videos of Khovansky singing the controversial song were originally uploaded to Vkontakte by the blogger Ай, Как Просто!, a hugely popular YouTuber and content creator inside of Russia who mostly talks about technology and digital culture. After having been alerted about Khovansky's videos, he assessed their provocational potency with other NKVD officers before going ahead with asking his followers to reprimand Khovansky and call for his arrest.

"Personally, these videos were sent to me by a subscriber. Having looked at them, I assessed all the prospects of a possible interest in them by young NKVD youths, and called on to write denunciations en masse, as our dids did."

In the same statement, he also called out the vlogger Dmitry Larin after he made a video about Pozdnyakov in December 2020 where he went into detail about Men's State and its ideology, calling its leader a "fascist" among other incendiary rhetoric. As a result, Pozdnyakov promised to "punish" the YouTuber. Further, Pozdnyakov called for his followers to closely study all of Larin's content for inflammatory language.

"--- videos, recordings of streams in which Larin could offend the feelings of believers, or justify terrorism and other things that fall under the Criminal Code of the Russian Federation."
