= Vasily Vlasov =

Russian politician

- Василий Власов
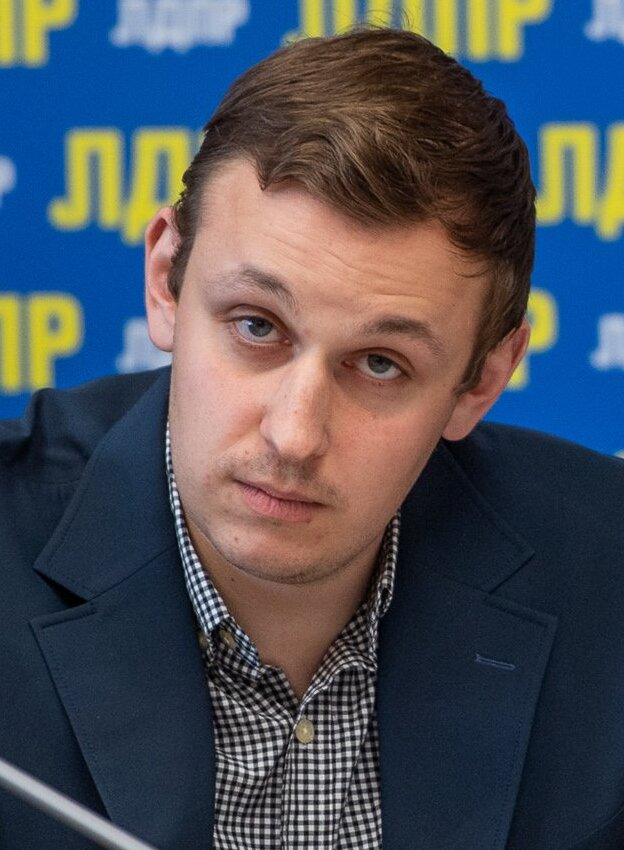
- Vlasov in 2023

Member of the State Duma
- In office 5 October 2016 – 1 November 2023

Personal details
- Born: 27 June 1995 (age 31) Moscow, Russia
- Party: Liberal Democratic Party of Russia (2011–2023)
- Education: Moscow State Pedagogical University
- Occupation: Politician
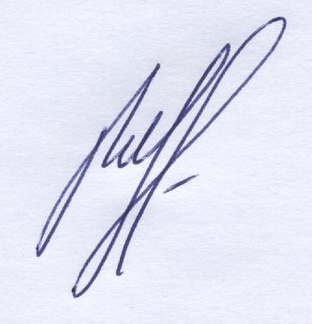
- Signature

Vasily Maksimovich Vlasov (Russian: Василий Максимович Власов; born 27 June 1995) is a Russian politician. He is the Head of management of sports and youth policy Russian University of Sports.

He was a deputy of the State Duma of the VII convocation from 5 October 2016 to 1 November 2023. Since April 2019, he was the first deputy chairman of the State Duma committee on natural resources, property and land relations.

== Biography ==
=== Education ===
Vasily Vlasov was born on 27 June 1995, in Moscow, and grew up in a single parent household. He studied at high school number 1350 in Moscow, including advanced studies in mathematics and physics. Vlasov later studied in the Institute of World Civilizations (Russian: Институт Мировых Цивилизаций), and at the Institute of Social and Humanities Education at Moscow State Pedagogical University. The Institute of World Civilizations is an accredited college that was established by Vladimir Zhirinovsky and the populist Liberal Democratic Party of Russia (LDPR).

=== Early career ===
At 16, he began working in the youth organization of the Liberal Democratic Party of Russia. Later, he became the director of the youth organization of the Liberal Democratic Party in Moscow. He was appointed head of the national youth organization of the Liberal Democratic Party, and also held a lead position in the office of Vladimir Zhirinovsky, leader of the Liberal Democratic Party. However, none of these were paid positions, as his financial disclosure revealed no income in 2015.

=== Deputy of the State Duma Russian Federation ===
In 2016, Vlasov was elected as a deputy in the State Duma, the lower house of the Federal Assembly of Russia, while still a university student. After the elections to the State Duma, he resigned as head of the youth organization of the Liberal Democratic Party. His first day in office was 5 October 2016, at the age of 21 years and 3 months. He was a member of the Committee on Physical Culture, Sports, Tourism and Youth Affairs.

In November 2016, Vlasov and fellow LDPR deputy Boris Chernyshov prepared a bill to lower the voting age in Russia from 18 to 16. This has been a policy of the LDPR since 2014, reflecting the popularity of the party among young people. However, the bill was swiftly rejected by the Russian government. Vlasov has also suggested lowering student train fares to encourage domestic tourism, particularly outside the vacation season, and to facilitate youth attendance at cultural and sporting events.

Following the rejection of their proposal to lower the voting age, Vlasov and Chernyshov advanced a similar proposal within the LDPR in January 2017. Vlasov suggested that involving people in political parties between the ages of 16 and 18 would help address declining turnout in elections, and lead to wider involvement in the political process.

On 24 March 2022, the United States Treasury sanctioned him in response to the 2022 Russian invasion of Ukraine.

== Facts ==
On 29 December 2021, LDPR leader Vladimir Zhirinovsky recorded a New Year's greeting video for a four-year-old girl named Darya Chernysheva, in which he stated that once she reached adulthood, Vlasov would marry her. He added that this would be "the greatest gift" for her and "the greatest tragedy in his personal life".

Before the Prigozhin mutiny on 24 June 2023, it was possible to enlist in the Wagner PMC through the reception office of Deputy Vlasov.

Among Vlasov's public assistants were bloggers Yury Khovansky and Ilya Maddison.
