= Kosino-Ukhtomsky District =

Kosino-Ukhtomsky District Косино-Ухтомский (Russian)
- District
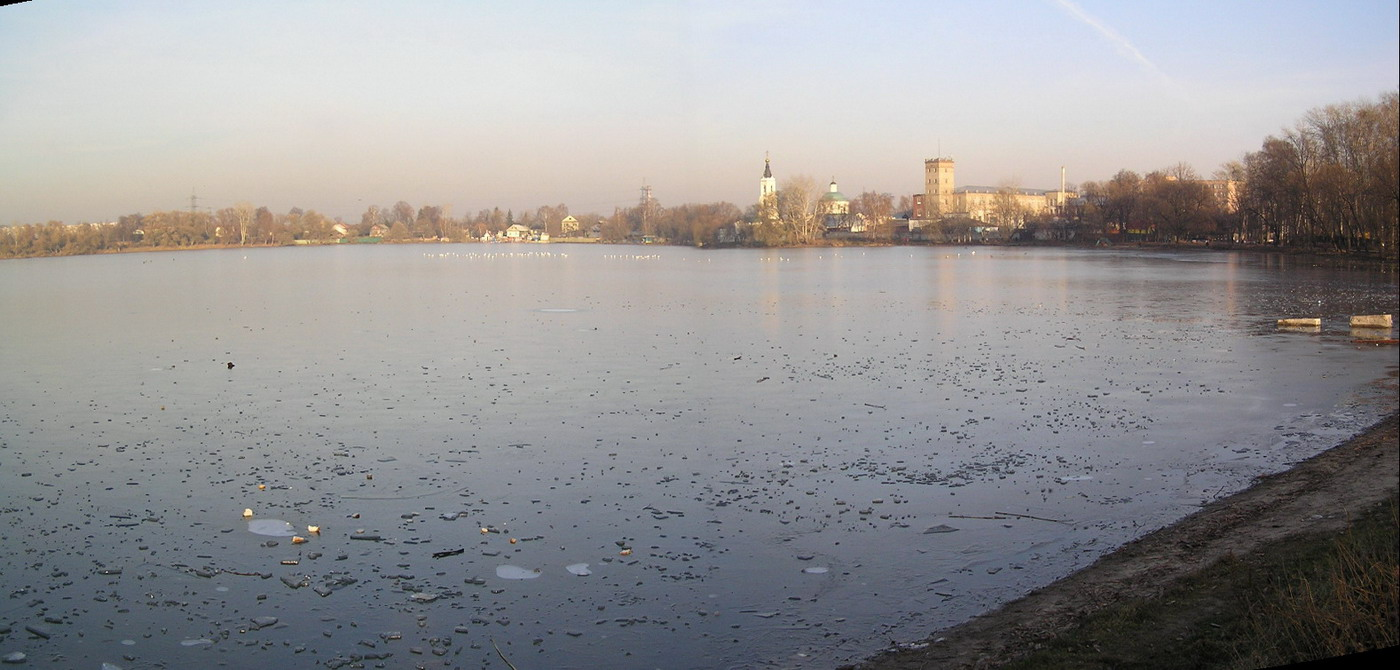
- Kosino, in Kosino-Ukhtomsky District

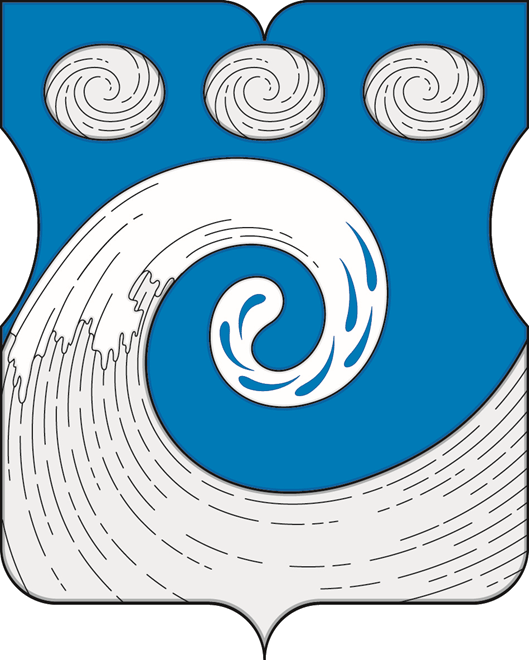
- Flag Coat of arms
- Location of Kosino-Ukhtomsky District on the map of Moscow
- Coordinates: 55°42′53″N 37°53′34″E
- Country: Russia
- Federal subject: Moscow
- Time zone: UTC+
- OKTMO ID: 45308000
- Website: http://kosino-uhtomski.mos.ru/

Kosino-Ukhtomsky District (Russian: Косино-Ухтомский райо́н) is an administrative district (raion) of Eastern Administrative Okrug, and one of the 125 raions of Moscow, Russia.

Moscow Districts in Eastern Administrative Okrug city Moscow and the same name Municipalities Moscow intra-city municipal unions. It borders on the Veshnyaki, Vykhino-Zhulebino, Novokosino and Nekrasovka, as well as city Lyubertsy. The area of the district is 1506 hectares.

District Kosino Ukhtomsky consists of three districts—Kozhukhovo, Kosino Kosino and Ukhtomsky. Population: 16,917.

== History ==
According to archaeological evidence, people lived in this area for a very long time. On the territory of Kosino and its surroundings at the end of the last century were discovered 4 groups mounds (of 15 mounds) and 2 Neolithic sites. People are so-called Abashevskaya archaeological culture Bronze Age lived here more in the 2nd millennium BCE. Three groups of mounds located between the White and Holy lakes, excavated, and one group—near Zhulebino—is still waiting for the excavation. Kosinski found in barrows items now in the Museum of Anthropology at Moscow State University.

== See also ==
- Administrative divisions of Moscow
