= List of Liberal Democratic Party of Russia deputies in the State Duma =

The Liberal Democratic Party of Russia currently has 21 members in the 8th convocation of the State Duma, the lower house of the Federal Assembly, the Russian parliament. The party was led by Vladimir Zhirinovsky until his death on 6 April 2022.

== 8th Convocation members ==
A total of 21 members of the party were elected to the 8th State Duma in the 2021 Russian legislative election. 19 members were elected from the party list, with a further 2 candidates returned through election victories in single-mandate constituencies. The elected members took up their mandates at the first meeting of the 8th State Duma, on 12 October 2021.

=== Elected on the party list ===
Indicates an incumbent member

Liberal Democratic Party of Russia Members of the State Duma by party list
Place on party list	Name	From	Until
1	Vladimir Zhirinovsky	12 October 2021	6 April 2022
1	Andrey Svintsov	1 June 2022	
2	Leonid Slutsky	12 October 2021	
3	Sergey Karginov	12 October 2021	
4	Yaroslav Nilov	12 October 2021	
5	Vladimir Sipyagin	12 October 2021	
6	Vasily Vlasov	12 October 2021	1 November 2023
6	Vasilina Kuliyeva	22 November 2023	
7	Boris Chernyshov	12 October 2021	
8	Andrey Lugovoy	12 October 2021	
9	Dmitry Svishchev	12 October 2021	
10	Valery Seleznev	12 October 2021	
11	Kaplan Panesh	12 October 2021	
12	Arkady Svistunov	12 October 2021	
13	Stanislav Naumov	12 October 2021	
14	Vladimir Koshelev	12 October 2021	
15	Ivan Musatov	12 October 2021	
16	Evgeny Markov	12 October 2021	
17	Ivan Sukharev	12 October 2021	
18	Boris Paykin	12 October 2021	
19	Yury Napso	12 October 2021	3 April 2025
19	Dmitry Novikov		

=== Elected in single-mandate constituencies ===
Liberal Democratic Party of Russia Members of the State Duma by single-mandate constituency
Federal Subject	Constituency	Name	From	Until
Smolensk Oblast	Roslavl	Sergey Leonov	12 October 2021	
Tomsk Oblast	Tomsk	Alexei Didenko	12 October 2021	

== Former members ==
=== 7th Convocation members ===
1. Andrei Valeryevich Andreichenko (Андрей Валерьевич Андрейченко)
2. Kirill Igorevich Cherkasov (Кирилл Игоревич Черкасов)
3. Boris Aleksandrovich Chernyshov (Борис Александрович Чернышов)
4. Mikhail Vladimirovich Degtyaryov (Михаил Владимирович Дегтярёв)
5. Vadim Yevgenyevich Dengin (Вадим Евгеньевич Деньгин)
6. Aleksei Nikolayevich Didenko (Алексей Николаевич Диденко)
7. Sergei Ivanovich Furgal (Сергей Иванович Фургал)
8. Sergei Vladimirovich Ivanov (Сергей Владимирович Иванов)
9. Sergei Genrikhovich Karginov (Сергей Генрихович Каргинов)
10. Sergei Mikhailovich Katasonov (Сергей Михайлович Катасонов)
11. Vasilina Vasilyevna Kuliyeva (Василина Васильевна Кулиева)
12. Aleksandr Borisovich Kurdyumov (Александр Борисович Курдюмов)
13. Andrei Albertovich Kuzmin (Андрей Альбертович Кузьмин)
14. Oleg Leonidovich Lavrov (Олег Леонидович Лавров)
15. Igor Vladimirovich Lebedev (Игорь Владимирович Лебедев)
16. Andrei Konstantinovich Lugovoi (Андрей Константинович Луговой)
17. Sergei Vladimirovich Marinin (Сергей Владимирович Маринин)
18. Anton Yuryevich Morozov (Антон Юрьевич Морозов)
19. Yury Aisovich Napso (Юрий Аисович Напсо)
20. Sergei Vasilyevich Natarov (Сергей Васильевич Натаров)
21. Yaroslav Yevgenyevich Nilov (Ярослав Евгеньевич Нилов)
22. Boris Romanovich Paikin (Борис Романович Пайкин)
23. Vitaly Lvovich Pashin (Виталий Львович Пашин)
24. Dmitry Ivanovich Savelyev (Дмитрий Иванович Савельев)
25. Valery Sergeyevich Seleznev (Валерий Сергеевич Селезнёв)
26. Aleksandr Nikolayevich Sherin (Александр Николаевич Шерин)
27. Danil Yevgenyevich Shilkov (Данил Евгеньевич Шилков)
28. Pavel Valentinovich Shperov (Павел Валентинович Шперов)
29. Leonid Eduardovich Slutsky (Леонид Эдуардович Слуцкий)
30. Aleksandr Sergeyevich Starovoitov (Александр Сергеевич Старовойтов)
31. Yelena Viktorovna Strokova (Елена Викторовна Строкова)
32. Ivan Konstantinovich Sukharev (Иван Константинович Сухарев)
33. Andrei Nikolayevich Svintsov (Андрей Николаевич Свинцов)
34. Dmitry Aleksandrovich Svishchyov (Дмитрий Александрович Свищёв)
35. Vladimir Vladimirovich Sysoyev (Владимир Владимирович Сысоев)
36. Igor Andreyevich Toroshchin (Игорь Андреевич Торощин)
37. Vasily Maksimovich Vlasov (Василий Максимович Власов)
38. Yury Gennadyevich Volkov (Юрий Геннадьевич Волков)
39. Sergei Aleksandrovich Zhigarev (Сергей Александрович Жигарев)
40. Vladimir Volfovich Zhirinovsky (Владимир Вольфович Жириновский)
