= Leonid Slutsky 2024 presidential campaign =

Russian political campaign

- Campaign: 2024 Russian presidential election
- Candidate: Leonid Slutsky; Leader of the Liberal Democratic Party (2022–present day); Member of the State Duma (1999–present day)
- Affiliation: Liberal Democratic Party
- Status: Announced and nominee: 19 December 2023; Lost election: 17 March 2024
- Slogan(s): Всегда рядом (Always there)

Website
- слуцкий2024.рф (campaign) lslutsky.ru (personal)

The 2024 presidential campaign of Leonid Slutsky, deputy of the State Duma and leader of the Liberal Democratic Party of Russia, was announced on 19 December 2023, during the party's congress.

Slutsky became the third person in history nominated by the Liberal Democratic Party for the President of Russia. After being nominated, Slutsky said that he "does not want to beat (incumbent president) Putin" in the election.

== Background ==
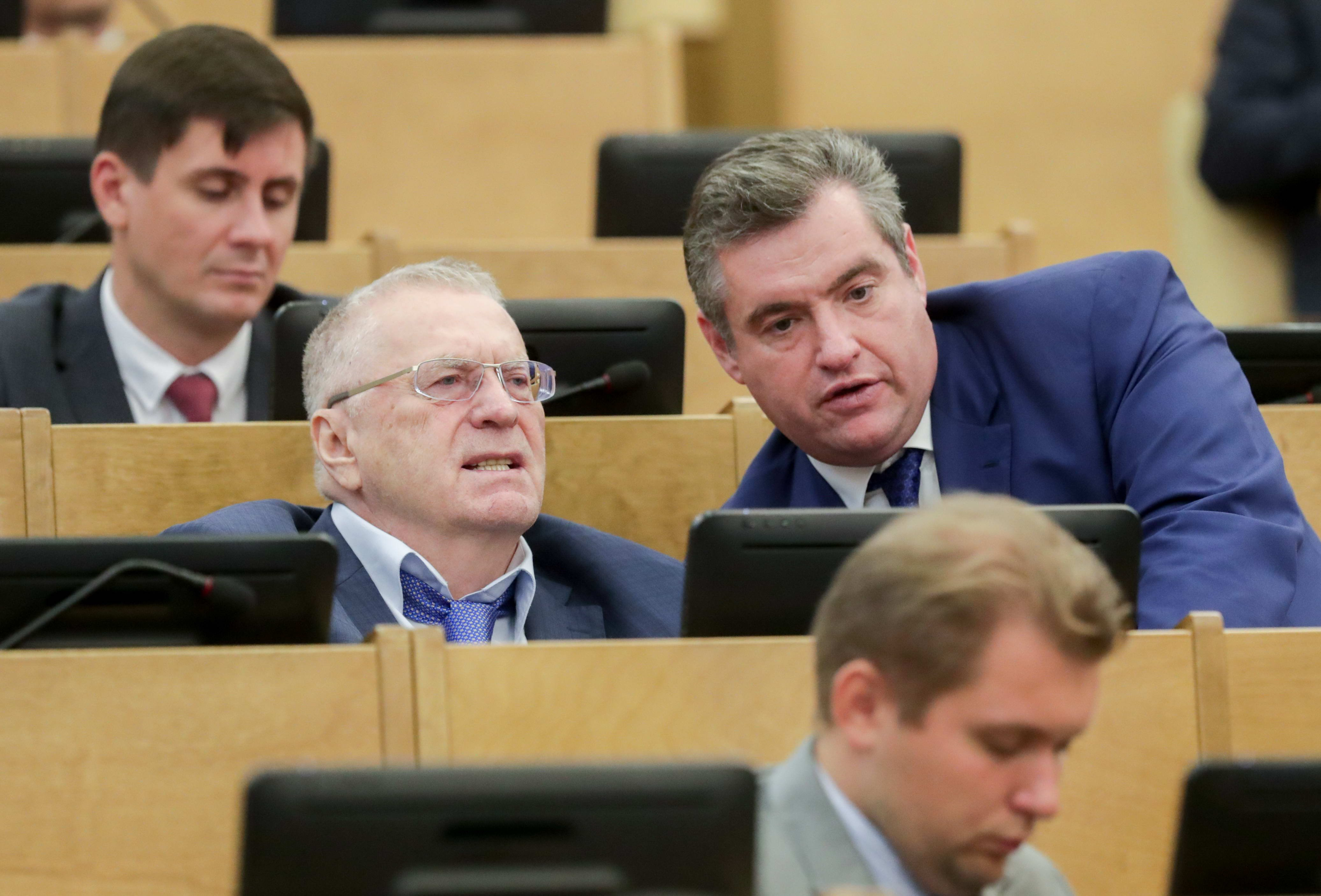
Vladimir Zhirinovsky and Leonid Slutsky during the State Duma session in 2019

From the moment of the party's creation in 1989 to 2022, its permanent leader was Vladimir Zhirinovsky. Zhirinovsky was the party's presidential candidate in almost all elections except 2004. Zhirinovsky had stated that he intended to participate in all presidential elections until he turned 90 (at least until 2036), and had also repeatedly expressed his intention to run for president in 2024.

In February 2022, Zhirinovsky was hospitalized in critical condition in Moscow with COVID-19. In March, he was reportedly placed in a medically induced coma, and underwent treatment for COVID-19 complications such as sepsis and respiratory failure. Zhirinovsky claimed to have been vaccinated against COVID-19 eight times.

On 6 April 2022, Vyacheslav Volodin, the Speaker of the Duma, announced that Zhirinovsky had died following a long illness. He was 75.

Vladimir Zhirinovsky named among his potential successors Mikhail Degtyarev, Alexei Didenko, Yaroslav Nilov, as well as his son Igor Lebedev.

In May 2022, an extraordinary congress of the party was held, at which its new leader was elected. Initially, Leonid Slutsky and Khabarovsk Governor Mikhail Degtyarev were considered the main candidates. However, shortly before the congress, Degtyarev declined to run for party leader and publicly endorsed Slutsky. Other persons who declared their intention to run for the leadership of the party were not allowed to vote. In this connection, Slutsky was elected the new leader of the party on an uncontested basis.

Slutsky has been a deputy of the State Duma since 1999. In 2016, he became chairman of the State Duma Committee on International Affairs and retained this position after the 2021 legislative election. Zhirinovsky repeatedly called Slutsky a candidate for the post of Minister of Foreign Affairs, if he is elected president of Russia.

== Announcement and nomination ==
=== Early speculation ===
Speculation about Slutsky's possible intention to run for president began immediately after his election as party leader. At the same time, Slutsky himself refused to give a clear answer about his participation in the elections, stating only that the party would definitely nominate its presidential candidate. According to him, the party should have started considering possible candidates after the 2023 regional elections.

According to media reports, the nomination of Slutsky was the main option for the party's participation in the election. In addition, according to political scientists, participation in the elections was necessary for Slutsky to strengthen his position in the party. If Zhirinovsky was one of the founders and the undisputed party leader, then Slutsky did not have such authority, and he had to fight several intra-party groups at once, including Alexei Didenko and Yaroslav Nilov, who previously were removed by Slutsky from leadership positions in the party's apparatus, and also such as Boris Chernyshov, Deputy Chairman of the State Duma and 2023 candidate for Mayor of Moscow, applying for the post of party leader.

=== Nomination ===
Leonid Slutsky was nominated as a presidential candidate from the Liberal Democratic Party at the party congress held on 19 December 2023, in Crocus Expo, Krasnogorsk, Moscow Oblast. Mikhail Degtyarev proposed the candidacy of Slutsky to the congress. 106 out of 108 delegates present at the congress voted for Slutsky by secret ballot.

At the same time, Slutsky did not announce his participation in the elections in advance and evasively answered relevant questions, promising to announce plans later.

== Campaign ==
=== Early preparation ===
Preparations for Slutsky's presidential campaign began long before the official announcement of his presidential candidacy. In November 2022, Leonid Slutsky appointed blogger Anastasia Kashevarova deputy head of the central office of the Liberal Democratic party. Kashevarova previously served as an assistant to the chairman of the State Duma Vyacheslav Volodin. According to the press service of the party, Kashevarova was appointed to lead the information policy. According to media reports, Kashevarova was appointed in order to increase Slutsky's fame and improve his image.

However, already in January 2023, information appeared in the media about Kashevarova's departure from this position. The reason for the media's departure was called "Kashevrova's workload at her main job".

In April 2023, information appeared in the media about Slutsky's dismissal of two political strategists Alexei Chadaev and Sergei Malakhov, who were preparing his presidential campaign. According to media reports, the reason for this step was allegedly a multiple overestimation of the cost of the services of third-party contractors to whom the political strategists applied. Previously, these political strategists worked with the speaker of the State Duma Vyacheslav Volodin and took part in the creation of the New People party.

=== Main campaign ===
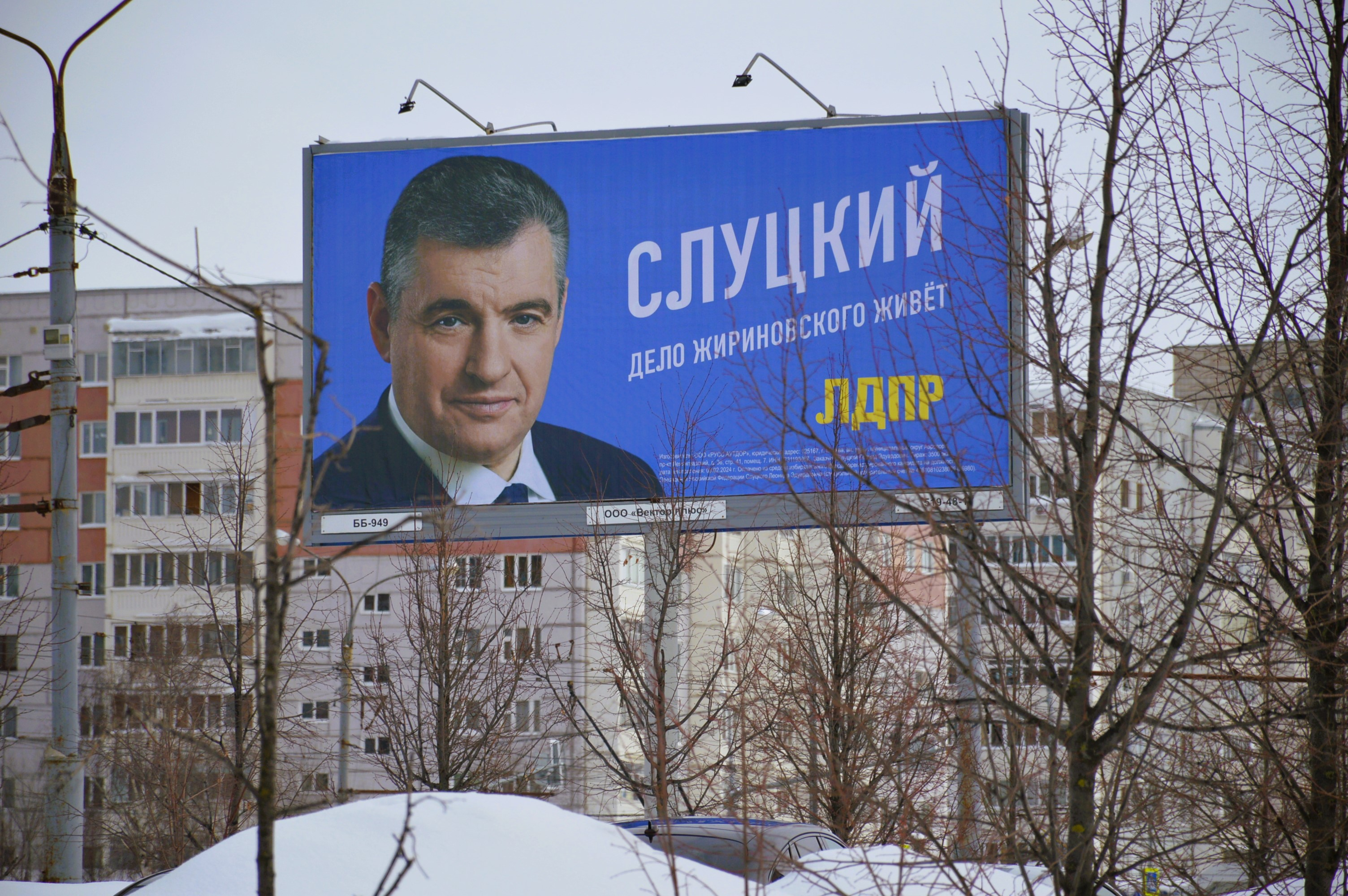
Slutsky Election campaign on the billboard of 2024 Russian presidential election

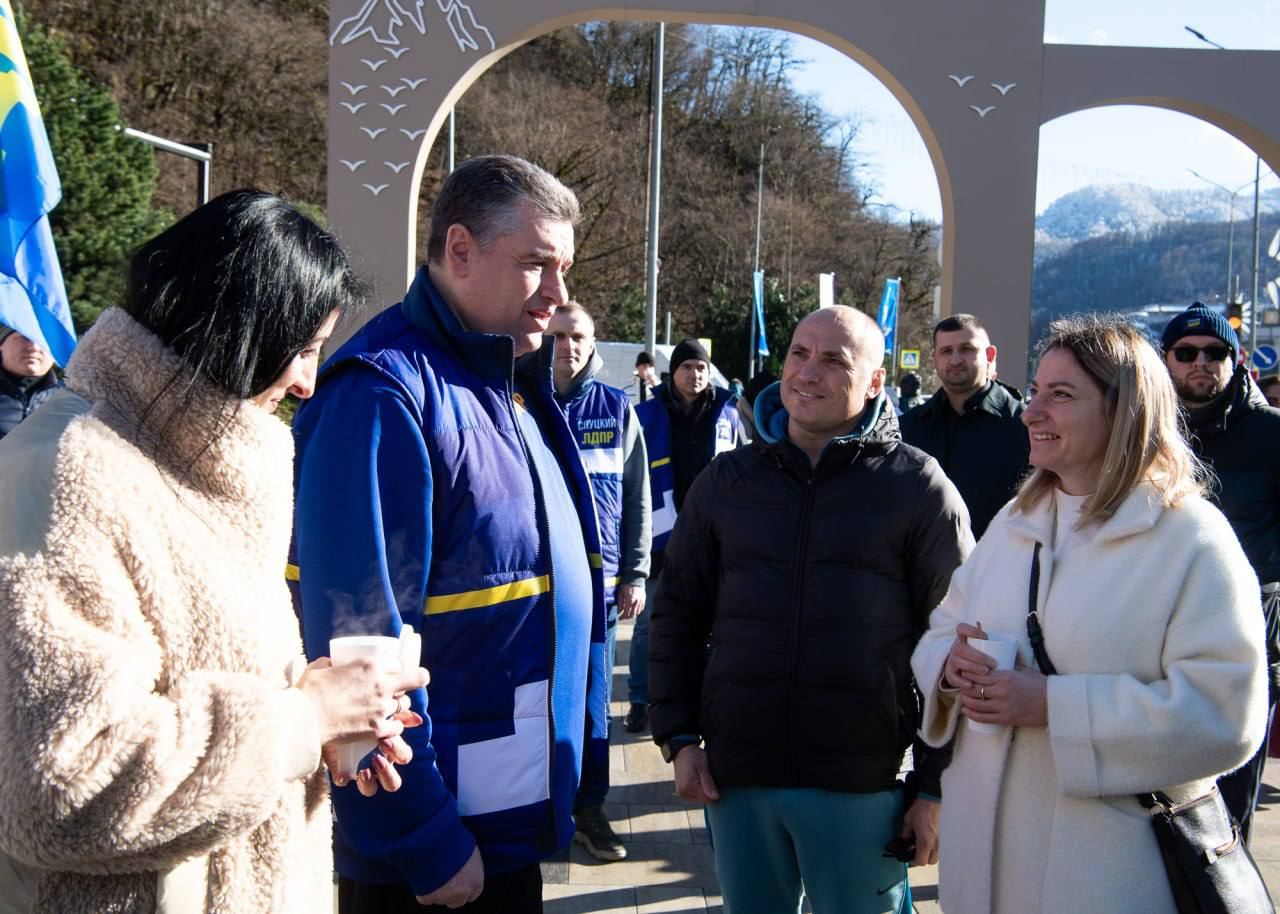
Slutsky during a visit to Sochi, January 6, 2024

As part of the presidential campaign, Slutsky intends to visit about 30 regions of the country. According to Slutsky, as he travels around the regions and communicates with people, his election program will be formed. According to him, it is necessary to find out what problems of citizens need to be solved in the very near future. This will be the election program for both the presidential and future parliamentary elections.

Slutsky's first trip as part of the campaign was a trip to Anadyr, Chukotka Autonomous Okrug, on 30 December 2023. In Anadyr, Slutsky visited the Chukotka Social Rehabilitation Center for Minors and the local greenhouse complex. After the New Year, Slutsky continued his trips to the regions of Russia. So, on 5 and 6 January 2024, Slutsky visited Sochi, where he met with local entrepreneurs and citizens. Also, on 6 January, Slutsky went to Saratov, where he visited a sewing workshop. On 10 January, Slutsky visited Stavropol, where he spoke to students of the local agrarian university and visited a dairy plant, where he discussed agricultural issues. On 11 January, Slutsky visited the Astrakhan Oblast, where he held a meeting with employees of the shipyard. During his visit to the shipyard, Slutsky discussed issues of the shipbuilding industry, and also inspected the construction of a new cruise ship, which will be named after Vladimir Zhirinovsky.

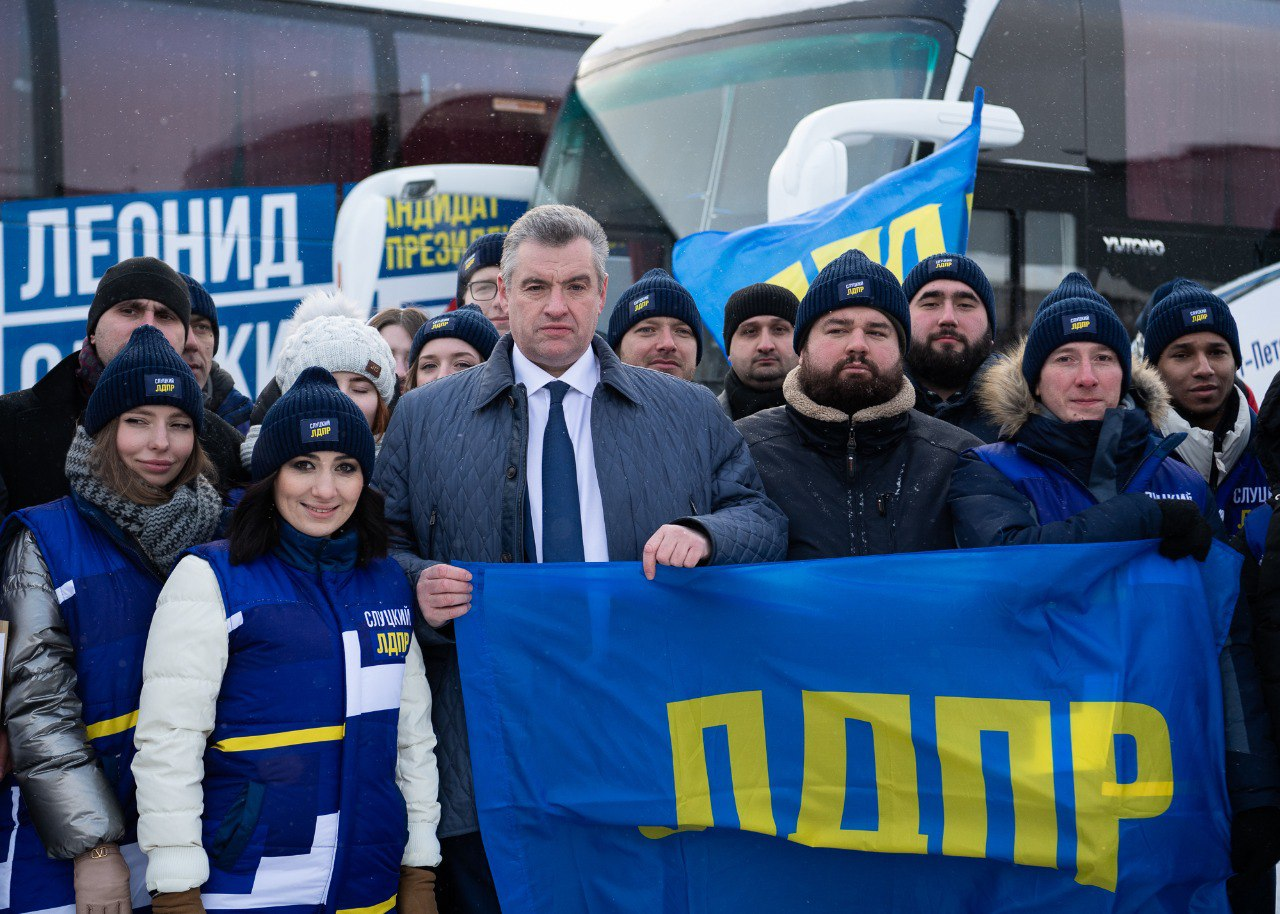
Slutsky with his supporters during the launch of campaign buses, January 17, 2024

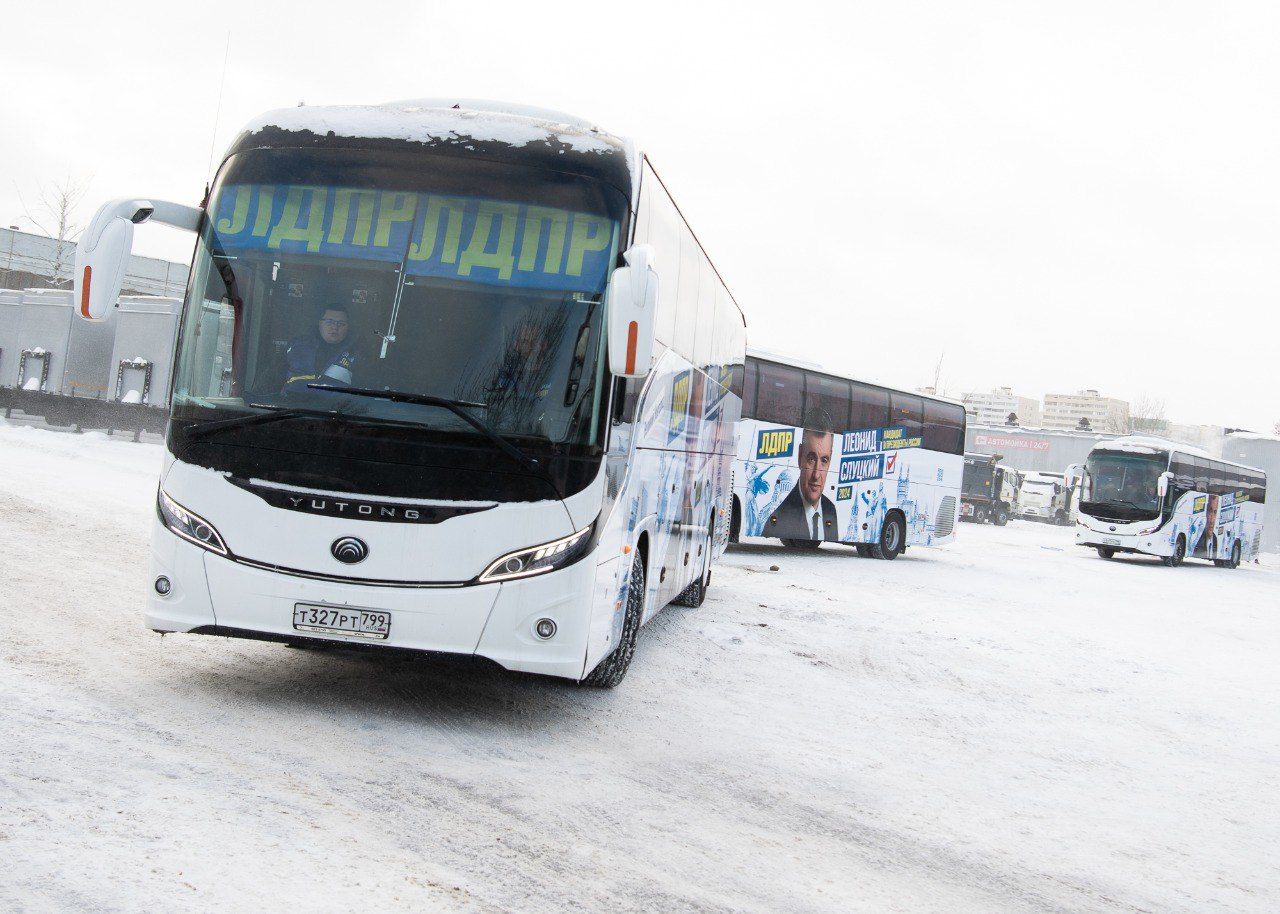
Slutsky's campaign buses

On 17 January 2024, Slutsky, in the company of his supporters, launched campaign buses that will travel throughout the country. In total, 11 buses have been launched, which, according to Slutsky, will be mobile reception points for citizens, where they can come with their questions.

== Endorsements ==
A number of Russian officials at federal and regional levels publicly endorsed Slutsky's candidacy.

- Yelena Afanasyeva, senator from Orenburg Oblast;
- Viktor Bout, member of the Legislative Assembly of Ulyanovsk Oblast;
- Mikhail Degtyarev, Governor of Khabarovsk Krai, former member of the State Duma;
- Maxim Krain, Liberal Democratic Party regional leader in Komi Republic;
- Sergey Leonov, member of the State Duma;
- Jambulat Umarov, Liberal Democratic Party regional leader in Chechen Republic.

== Results ==
Results of Slutsky by federal subject.

Slutsky got 2,795,629 votes or 3.24%.
