= Federal Assembly (Russia) =

Bicameral legislature of Russia

Federal Assembly Федеральное собрание Federalnoye sobraniye

Type
- Type: Bicameral
- Houses: Federation Council (upper house) State Duma (lower house)

History
- Founded: 12 December 1993; 32 years ago
- Preceded by: Supreme Soviet of Russia; Constitutional Conference of Russia

Leadership
- Chairwoman of the Federation Council: Valentina Matviyenko, United Russia since 21 September 2011
- Chairman of the State Duma: Vyacheslav Volodin, United Russia since 5 October 2016

Structure
- Seats: 628: Federation Council: 178 (Note: The federal subjects of Russia include several not internationally recognized as part of Russia. The Republic of Crimea and Sevastopol were annexed in 2014, and Donetsk People's Republic, Luhansk People's Republic, Zaporizhzhia Oblast and Kherson Oblast in 2022.); State Duma: 450
- Federation Council political groups: Non-partisan (de facto affiliations): United Russia (136); LDPR (3); CPRF (2); A Just Russia (1); Independent (34); Vacant seats (2)
- State Duma political groups: Government (374) United Russia (350) (Note: United Russia (349) Independent (1)) Liberal Democratic Party (24) (Note: Liberal Democratic Party (23) Independent (1)) Other parties (76) Communist Party (37) New People (20) (Note: New People (19) Independent (1)) A Just Russia (17) Rodina (1) Independent (1)

Elections
- Federation Council voting system: Indirect election
- State Duma voting system: Parallel voting: 225 seats are elected by Party-list proportional representation with 5% electoral threshold; 225 seats are elected by First past the post
- Last Federation Council election: 12 December 1993
- Last State Duma election: 18–20 September 2026
- Next State Duma election: Before 20 September 2031

Meeting place
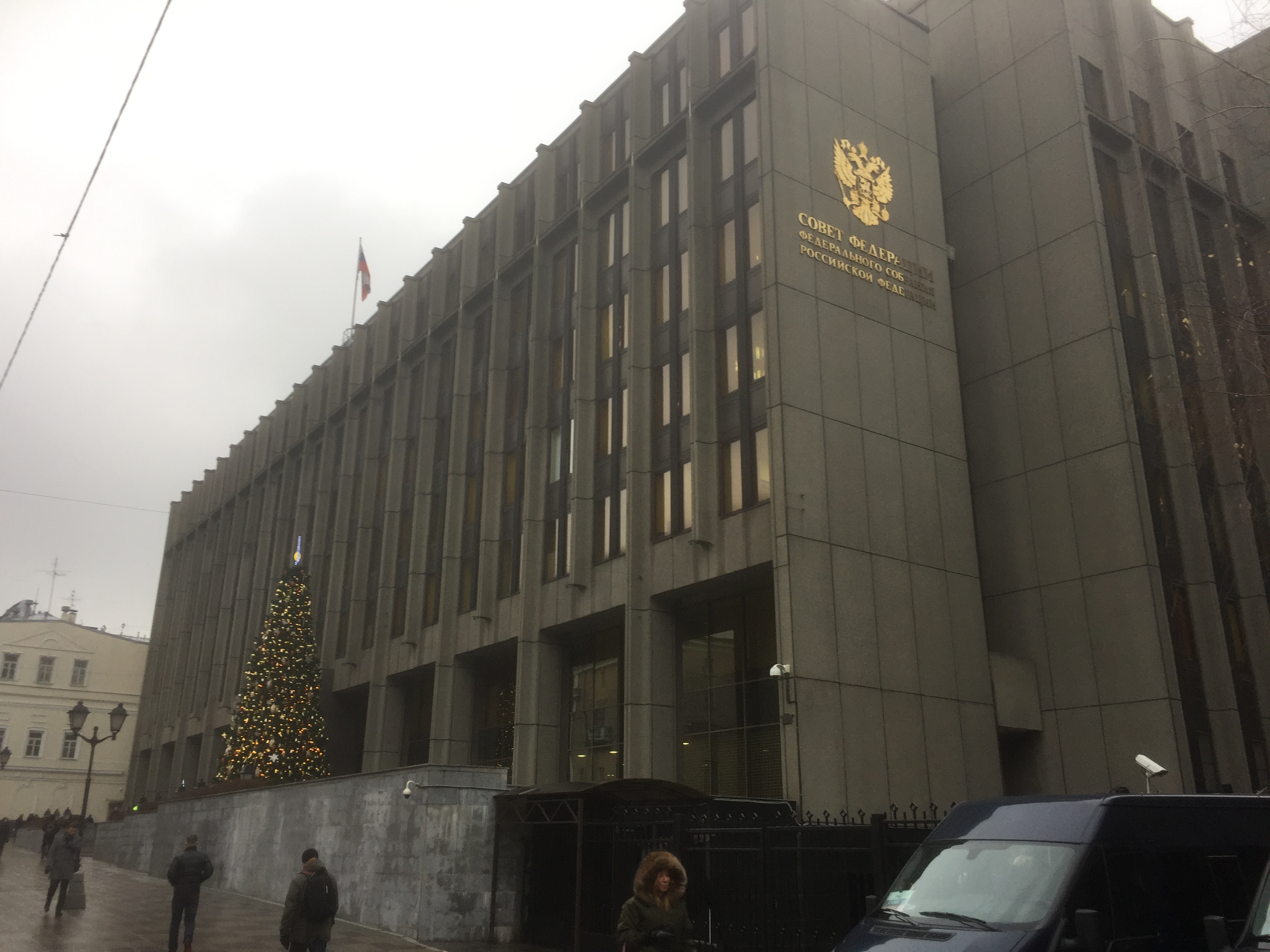
- Federation Council Building, Moscow
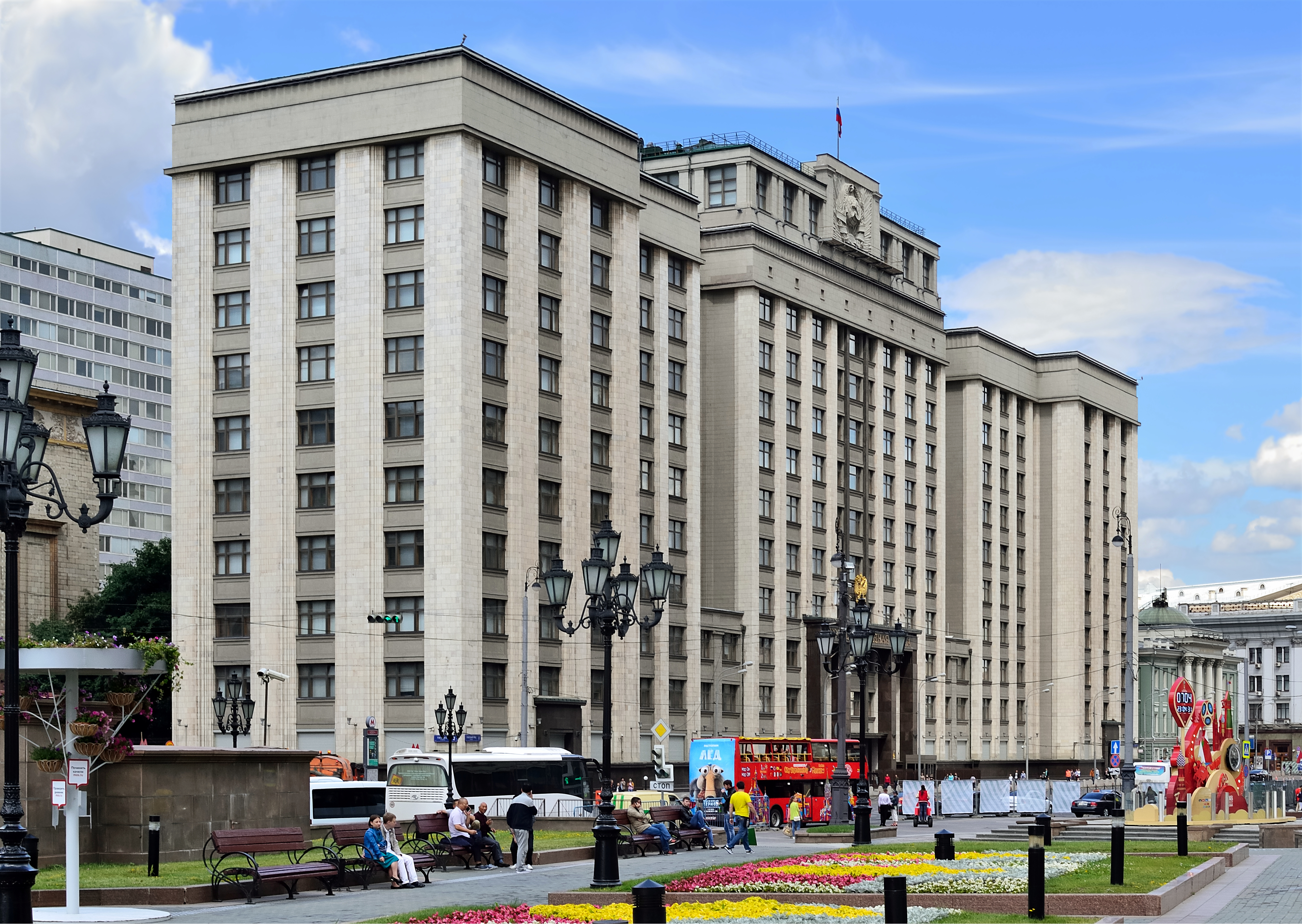
- State Duma Building, Moscow

Website
- Gov.ru

Constitution
- Constitution of Russia, Chapter V, Articles 94-109

The Federal Assembly (Note: Russian: Федера́льное собра́ние, romanized: Federal'noye sobraniye, IPA: [fʲɪdʲɪˈralʲnəjə sɐˈbranʲɪjə]) is the bicameral national legislature of Russia. The upper house is the Federation Council, and the lower house is the State Duma. The assembly was established by the Constitution of the Russian Federation in 1993, replacing the former Supreme Soviet of Russia. It is located in Moscow.

The Chairman of the Federation Council is the third most important position after the President and the Prime Minister. In the case that both the President and the Prime Minister are incapacitated, the Speaker of the upper house of the Russian parliament becomes Acting President of Russia.

The jurisdiction of the Federation Council includes: approval of changes in borders between federal subjects of Russia, approval of the presidential decree on the introduction of a martial law or on the introduction of a state of emergency, deciding on the possibility of using the Armed Forces of Russia outside the territory of Russia, appointment of elections of the President, impeachment of the President, appointment of judges of higher courts of Russia, appointment and dismissal of the Prosecutor General of Russia, appointment and dismissal of Deputy Chairman and half of the auditors of the all Accounts Chamber and others.

The jurisdiction of the State Duma includes: consent to the appointment of the Prime Minister (Chairman of the Government), deciding the issue of confidence in the Government, appointment and dismissal of the Governor of the Central Bank, appointment and dismissal of the Chairman and half of the auditors of the Accounts Chamber, appointment and dismissal of the Commissioner for Human Rights, proclamation of amnesty, advancing of charges against the President for his impeachment and others.

Since the 2003 elections, the Federal Assembly has been referred to by analysts and observers as being a rubber stamp institution.

== Powers ==
As the Russian legislature, all laws must be voted in the Federal Assembly before they are signed into law. All bills, even those proposed by the Federation Council, must first be considered by the State Duma. Upon adoption by a majority of the full State Duma membership, a draft law is considered by the Federation Council, which has fourteen days to place the bill on its calendar. The Federation Council cannot make changes in bills passed by the Duma and can either approve or reject them. If the Federation Council rejects a bill passed by the State Duma, the two chambers must form a conciliation commission to work out a compromise version of the legislation. If two chambers cannot reach a compromise, or the Duma insists on passing the bill as is, the veto of the Federation Council can be overridden, if two thirds of the Duma's constitutional composition vote in favor of the bill.

The State Duma and the Federation Council usually meet separately. Joint sessions are organized when:

- President of Russia delivers his annual address to the Federal Assembly;
- For hearing of addresses of the Constitutional Court of Russia;
- To hear the speeches of leaders of foreign States.

== Parliamentary centre ==
In the mid 2000s it was suggested that the Parliamentary centre of the State Duma and Federation Council be combined into one building. In 2012, the idea was supported by President Dmitry Medvedev. Reasons cited for the construction of a new building included the cramped nature of the parliament members' current offices, the remote locations of these offices split across ten locations in Moscow, and the desire of the government to move the bodies away from the city centre to reduce traffic congestion.

Various areas of Moscow were examined to serve as the new parliamentary center: Kutuzovsky Avenue, Frunzenskaya Embankment, "Moscow City", Tushino airfield, Krasnaya Presnya Street, Moskvoretskaya Embankment, Muzeon Park of Arts and the Sofia Embankment. In September 2014, the Mnyovniki floodplain was selected, a decision which was protested by ecologists.

The design of the new building was to be decided on the basis of an architectural competition. The parliamentarians, however, disagreed on aesthetic decisions between candidates in the competition, which were not resolved when the contest was conducted a second time.

Financing issues caused complications. Originally, the Parliamentary center was to be funded by private investors, who would in turn receive ownership of a building currently belonging to the State Duma and the Federation Council, as well as permits to tear it down and replace the building with their own development projects (such as hotels). An objection to this plan was lodged by architectural critic Grigory Revzin, arguing that the State Duma is located in the building of the Council of Labor and Defense which was designed by Arkady Langman and built in 1935, rendering the existing State Duma building an architectural monument, which would be protected by the state and cannot be demolished.

Work on the parliamentary center was to begin in 2020. However, in 2016 it was postponed to an unknown date due to the economic situation and disagreements on what the center should look like.

== See also ==
- City duma
- List of legislatures by country
- Politics of Russia
- Regional parliaments of Russia
