= Dmitry Svishchev =

Russian politician and sports administrator

Dmitry Svishchev MP
- Дмитрий Свищев
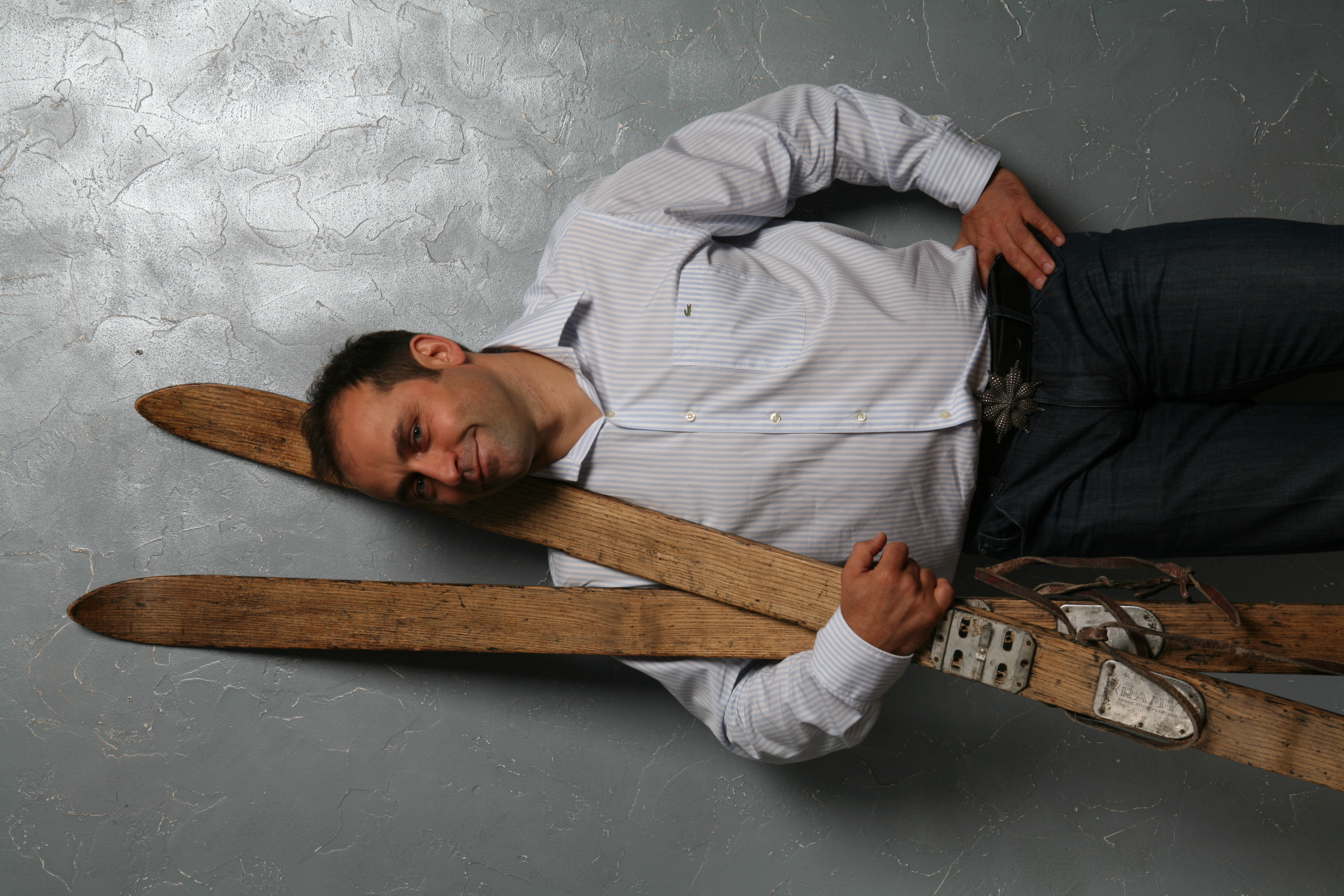
- Dmitry Svishchev in August 2008

Member of the State Duma (Party List Seat)
- Incumbent
- Assumed office 21 December 2011

President of the Russian Curling Federation
- Incumbent
- Assumed office 2010

Personal details
- Born: 22 May 1969 (age 56) Moscow, RSFSR, USSR
- Political party: Liberal Democratic Party of Russia
- Education: Financial University (2004)
- Occupation: Politician; Economist; Sports Administrator

Dmitry Aleksandrovich Svishchev (Russian: Дмитрий Александрович Свищёв; born 22 May 1969 in Moscow) is a Russian politician, a deputy of the 7th State Duma of the Russian Federation. He rose to prominence as a businessman and sports administrator.

Svishchev continues his involvement in national and international sports through his membership in the State Duma Committee on Physical Culture, Sport and Youth Affair, and as president of the Russian Curling Federation.

On 24 March 2022, the United States Treasury sanctioned him in response to the 2022 Russian invasion of Ukraine.

== Biography ==
=== Business career ===
After discharge from the Soviet Armed Forces, Svishchev founded a modeling agency in 1994. This was followed by business interests in a hardware supplier and in Europodium, which specializes in mobile stage structures for entertainment events. He then became deputy general manager of Krylatskoye Sports Complex, a major complex with features including an archery field and a velodrome.

In 1999, he founded the first professional ski club in Russia. He remained president of the club until 2007.

=== Education ===
Svishchev graduated from the Financial University under the Government of the Russian Federation in 2004, specializing in finance and credit.

=== Sports administration career ===
Svishchev was first vice-president of the Russian Federation of Skiing and Snowboarding, which began holding major competitions in alpine skiing with his direct participation and leadership. He contributed to the decision in 2007 by the International Ski Federation to hold the Snowboard World Cup in two disciplines in Russia for the first time. This event included the first ever parallel slalom course on the world's biggest snow ramp.

Since 2010, Svishchev has been president of the Russian Curling Federation. During his leadership of the Federation, Russia national curling teams have been near the top of world rankings, and Russians won medals for the first time at the World Cup. In Moscow and Sochi, specialized sites were built under the supervision of the Curling Federation, including the Olympic facility, the Ice Cube Curling Center.

== Olympics ==
As Chairman of the State Duma Committee on Physical Culture, Sport and Youth Affairs, Svishchev proposed that Russian athletes be exempted from income tax for prizes and incentive payments earned from their competing at the Olympics, Paralympics and Deaflympics. He stated that it would raise the prestige of athletes, and also demonstrate national support for their efforts.

Svishcev is known for his controversial statements, frequently accusing the United States and Japan of running an influence campaign within the IOC with a goal of discrediting Russian athletes and make Russia unable to win many medals and improve its international prestige.

During the 2021 World Junior Ice Hockey Championships, Svishchev compared Russia's victory over Sweden to the Battle of Poltava of 1709.

== Property ==
He owns several real estate properties: a land plot of 3,900 m², a residential house of 29.3 m², and an apartment of 120.2 m². His wife is registered as the owner of three land plots (3,570 m², 3,680 m², and 3,900 m²), a residential house of 29.3 m², and five apartments: 71.7 m², 120.2 m², and three apartments of 71.7 m² each. Their children are registered as owners of three apartments, each measuring 120.2 m².
