= Leonid Slutsky (politician) =

Russian politician (born 1968)

Leonid Slutsky MP
- Леонид Слуцкий
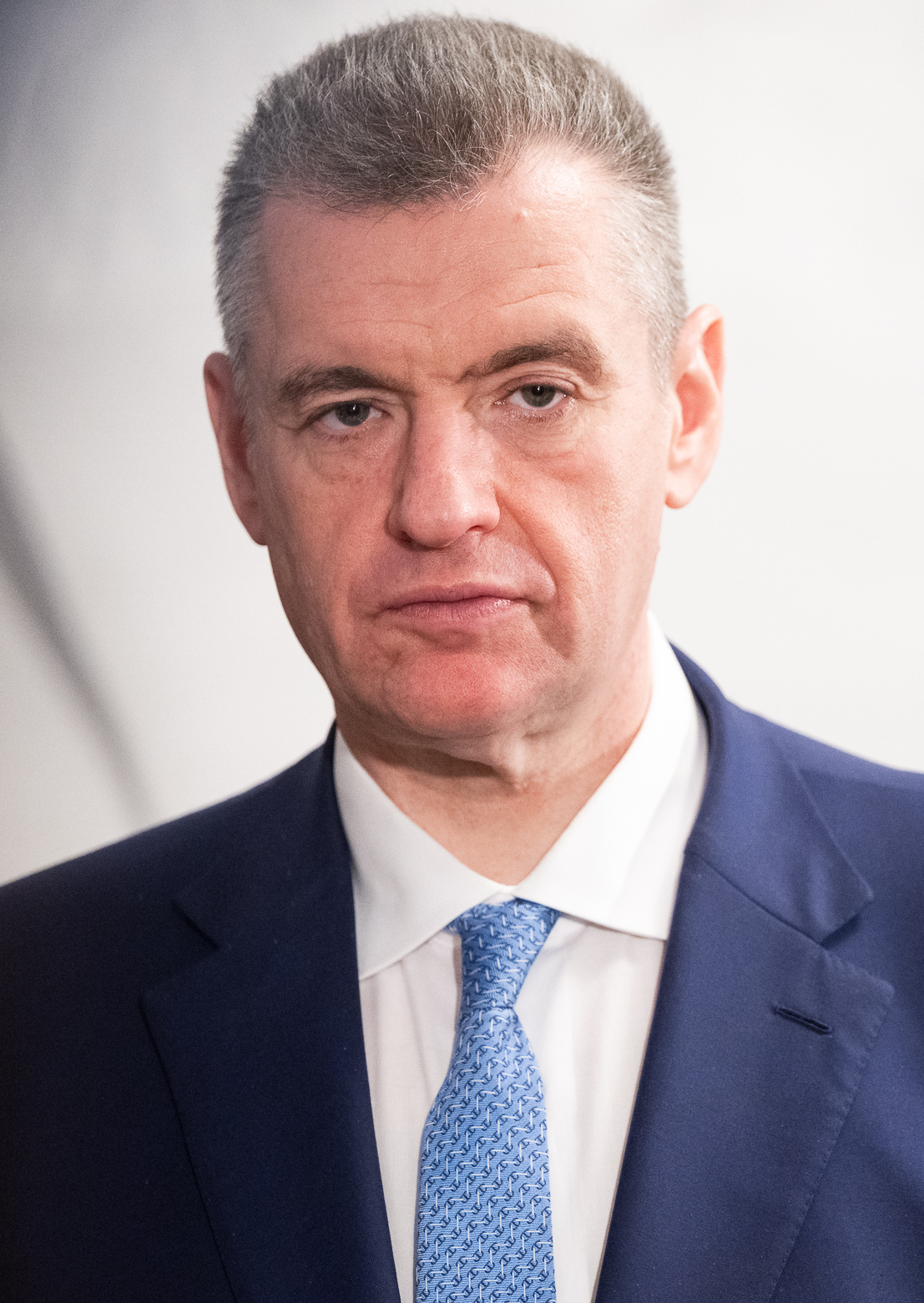
- Slutsky in 2025

Leader of the Liberal Democratic Party of Russia
- Incumbent
- Assumed office 27 May 2022
- Preceded by: Alexei Didenko (acting); Vladimir Zhirinovsky

Chairman of the State Duma Committee on International Affairs
- In office 5 October 2016 – 30 September 2026
- Preceded by: Aleksey Pushkov
- Succeeded by: Pyotr Tolstoy

Member of the State Duma
- Incumbent
- Assumed office 19 January 2000
- Constituency: Party-list (2000–present)

Delegate to the Parliamentary Assembly of the Council of Europe
- In office 25 March 2000 – 16 March 2022

Chairman of the State Duma committee on the CIS, Eurasian Integration, and Relations with Compatriots
- In office 21 December 2011 – 5 October 2016
- Preceded by: Alexey Ostrovsky
- Succeeded by: Leonid Kalashnikov

Personal details
- Born: 4 January 1968 (age 58) Moscow, RSFSR, USSR
- Party: LDPR

Leonid Eduardovich Slutsky (Note: Also transliterated Slutskii, Slutskiy or Slucky) (/ˈsluːtski/ SLOOT-ski; Russian: Леонид Эдуардович Слуцкий; born 4 January 1968) is a Russian politician who has been the leader of the Liberal Democratic Party of Russia since 27 May 2022.

Delegate to the Parliamentary Assembly of the Council of Europe from 2000 to 2022.

With his party being associated with the hard right of the political spectrum, Slutsky's tenure as Chairman of the State Duma Committee on International Affairs has been eventful and widely covered in the national and international media. In 2018, he was the central figure of a sexual assault scandal in parliament. In 2022, he represented Russia during peace negotiations with Ukraine following the Russian invasion. The following year, he announced his candidacy in the 2024 Russian presidential election.

== Biography ==
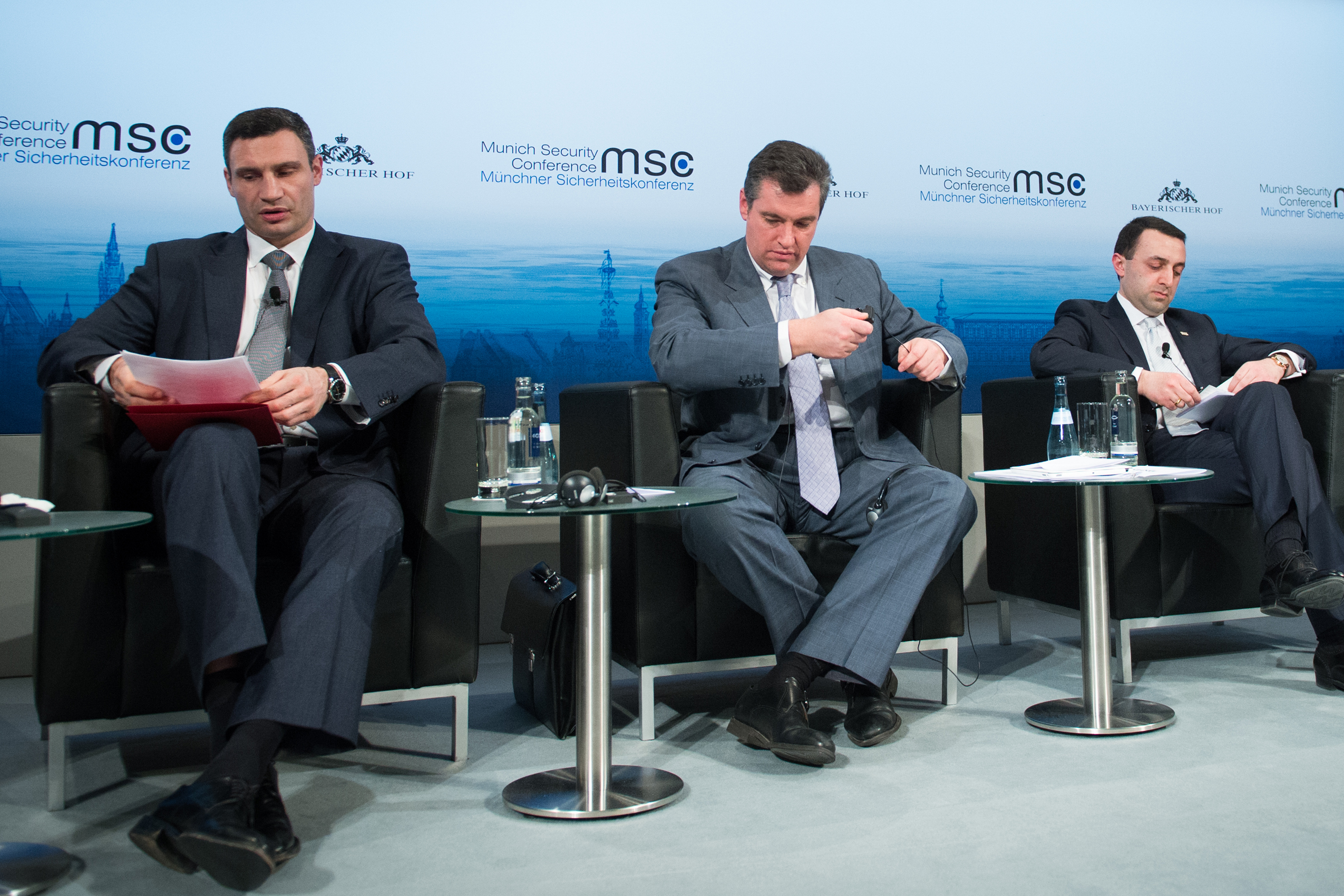
Slutsky with Vitali Klitschko and Irakli Garibashvili at the 50th Munich Security Conference on 1 February 2014

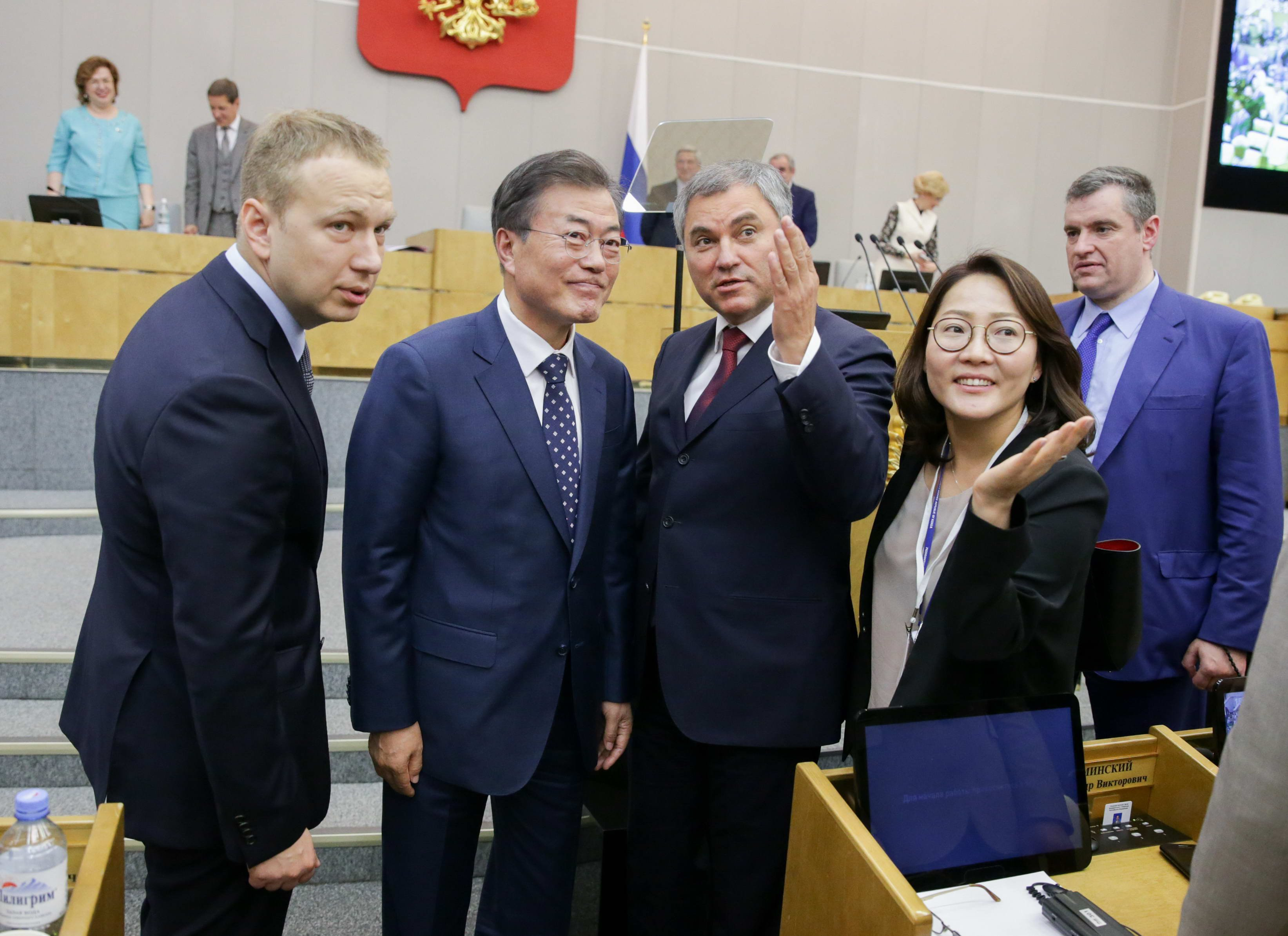
Slutsky and Vyacheslav Volodin with South Korean President Moon Jae-in in the State Duma on 21 June 2018

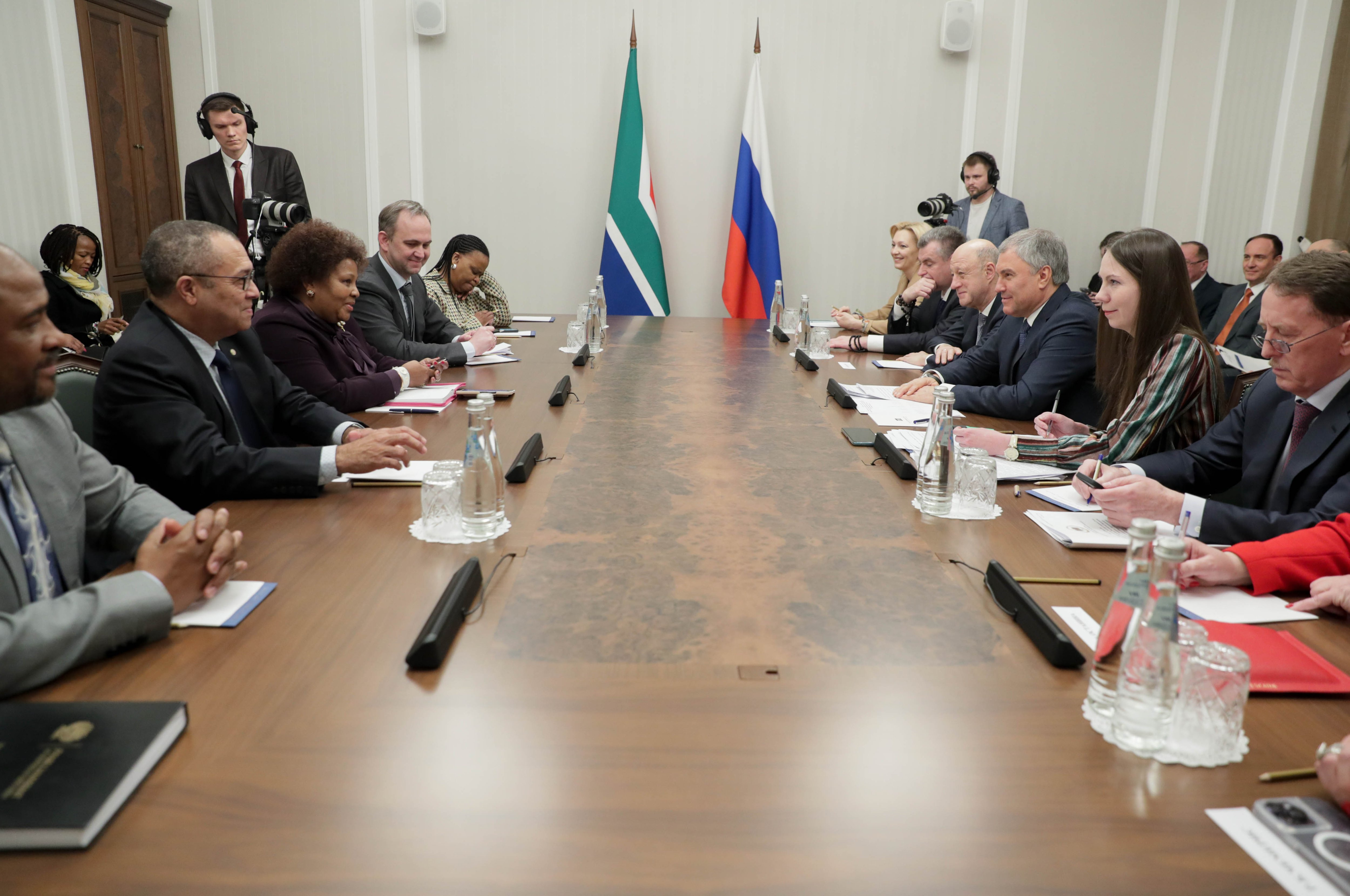
Slutsky and Volodin with the South African delegation led by Nosiviwe Mapisa-Nqakula, Moscow, 17 March 2023

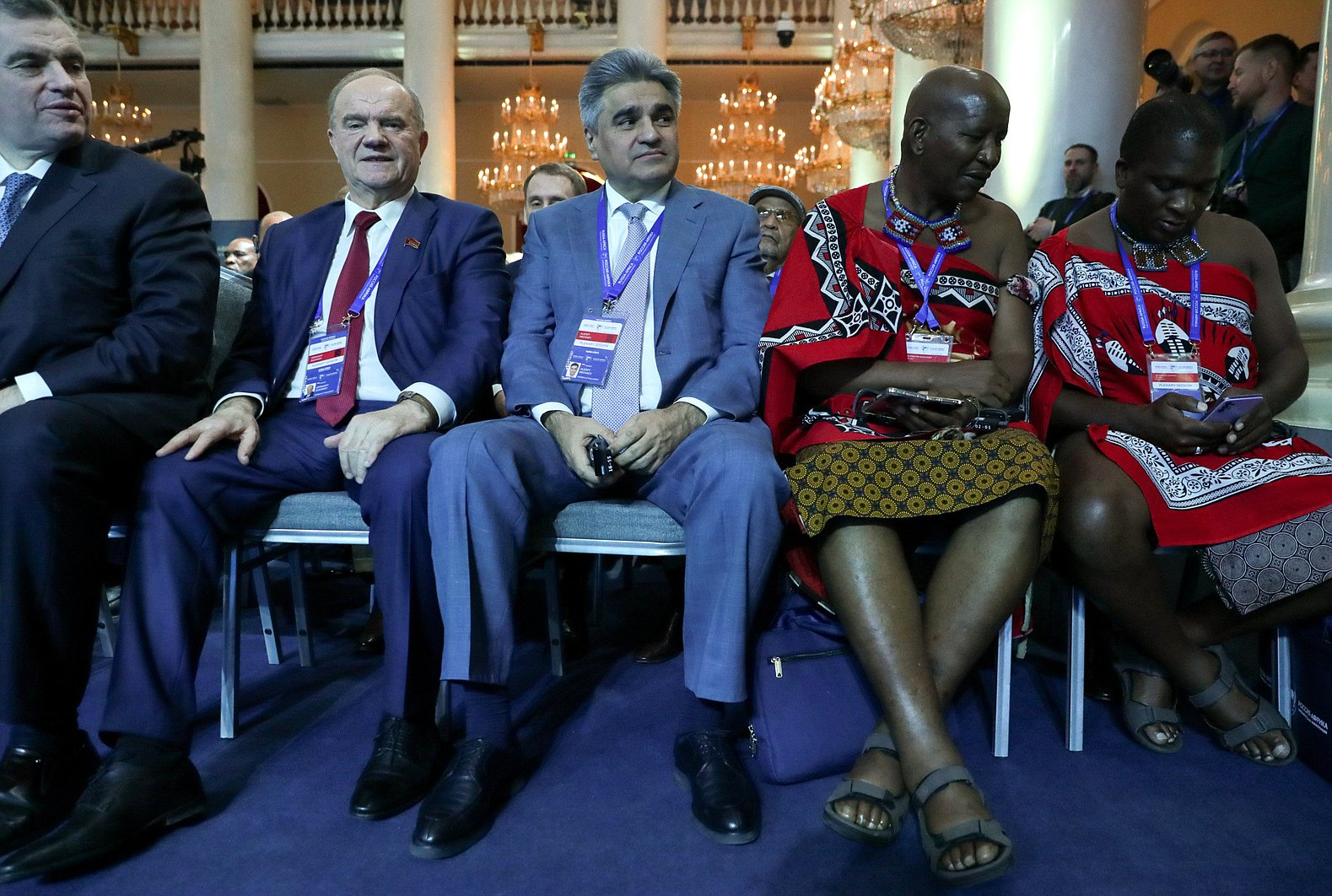
Slutsky, Gennady Zyuganov and Alexey Nechayev at the "Russia-Africa" parliamentary conference in Moscow on 20 March 2023

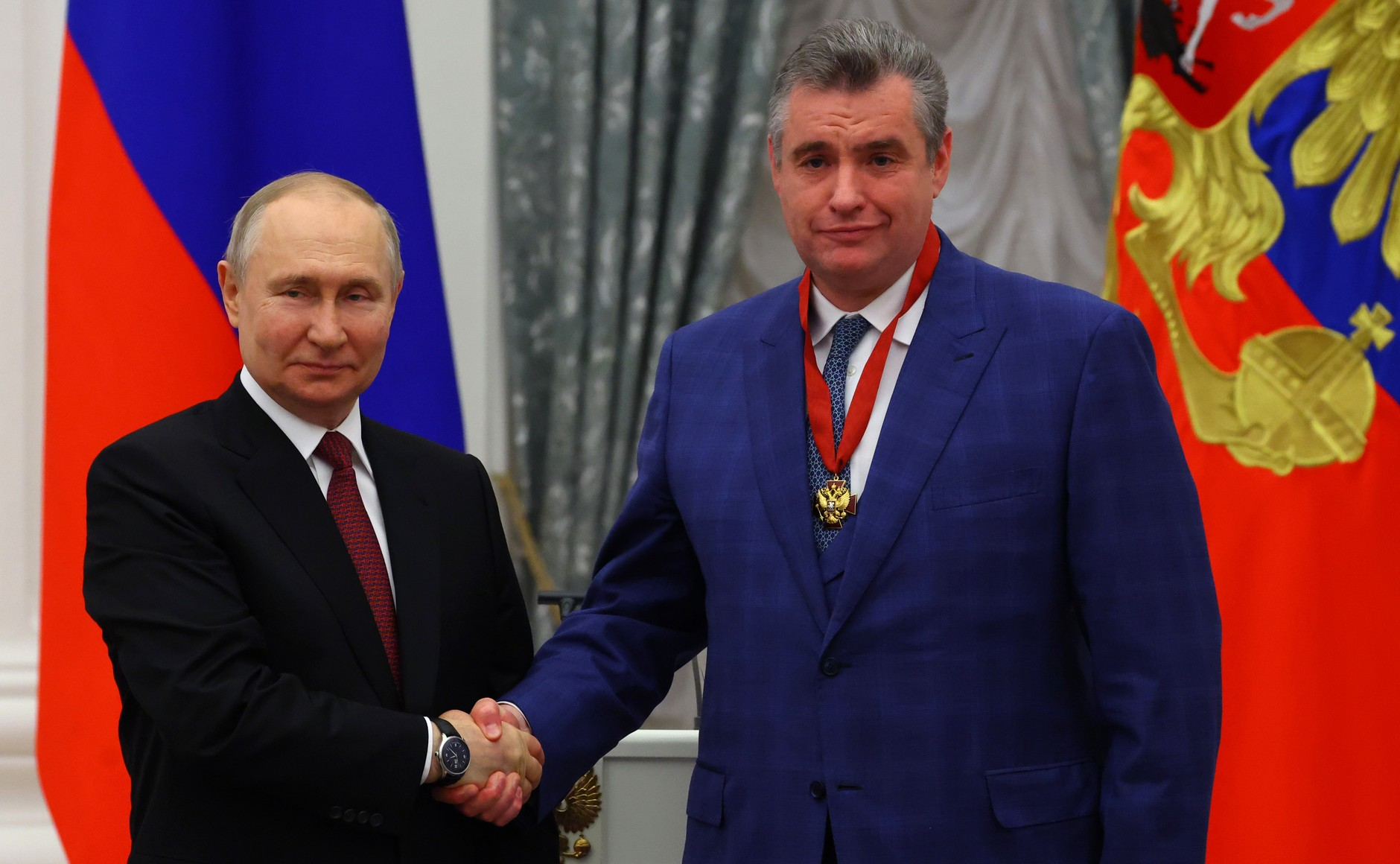
Slutsky with Russian President Vladimir Putin on 23 May 2023

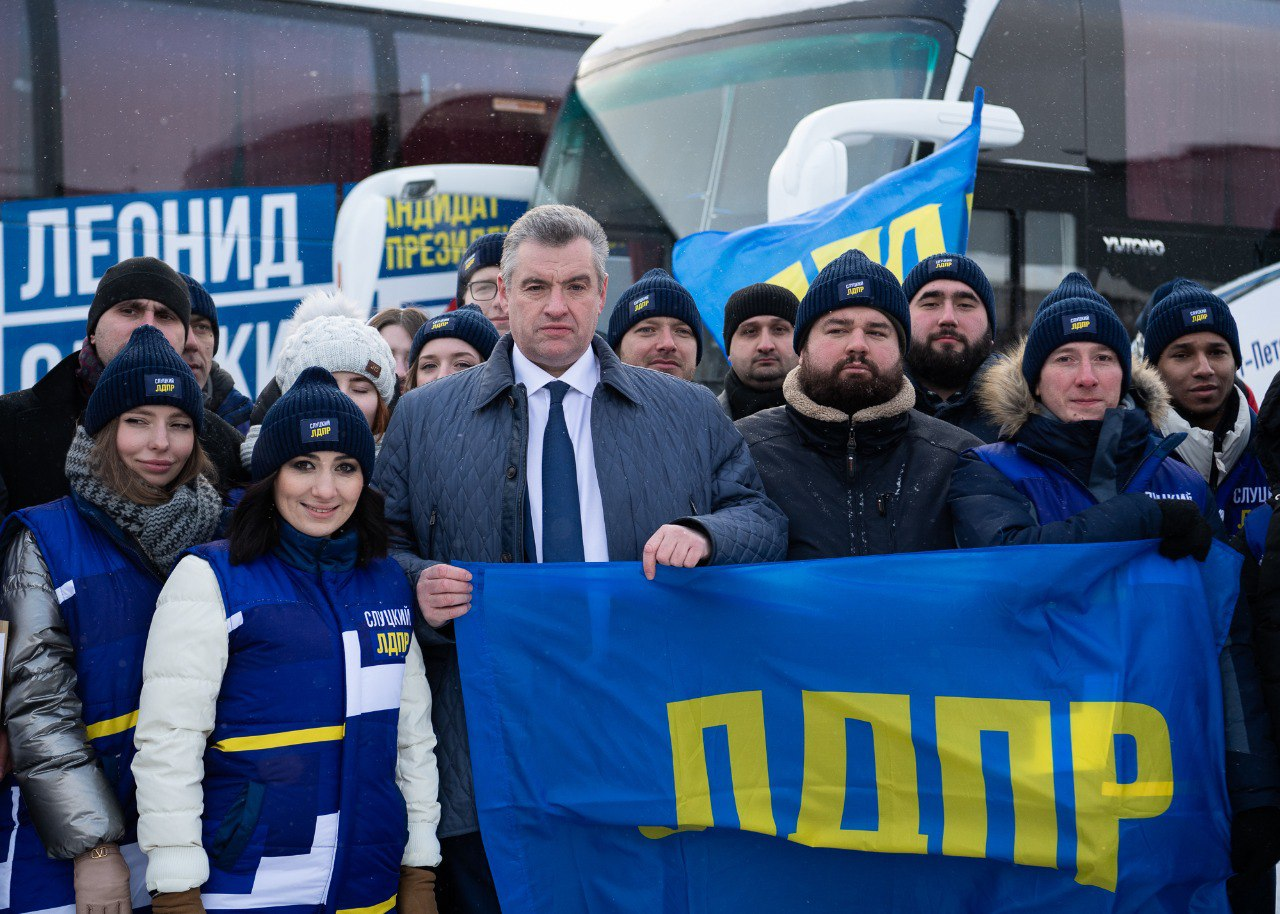
Slutsky with his supporters during the launch of campaign buses, 17 January 2024

Slutsky has been a First Deputy Chairman of the State Duma's Committee on International Affairs, and became Chairman of the Committee on International Affairs in the 7th State Duma. He is dean of the international relations department at the Moscow State University of Economics, Information and Statistics. He has held senior banking positions and was an advisor to the mayor of Moscow. Slutsky also reported to a directorate of the Presidium of the Supreme Soviet of the RSFSR. He holds an economics doctorate from the Moscow Economic-Statistical Institute.

On 17 March 2014, the day after the Crimean status referendum, Slutsky became one of the first seven persons who were sanctioned by President Obama under Executive order 13661. The sanctions freeze his assets in the US and ban him from entering the United States. Due to the annexation of Crimea by the Russian Federation, he was put also on the Canadian and the EU sanction lists.

On 1 February 2017, Slutsky signaled a closer relationship between Russia and Syria, stating that the International Affairs Committee was planning a joint session of the State Duma and the People's Council of Syria.

In 2017, Slutsky called the Catalan independence referendum a "litmus test" for the European Union, asking "Will Brussels agree with the right of nations to self-determination, as was convenient with Kosovo, or will it continue to insist on the principle of territorial integrity" as it did with Crimea.

In October 2018, Slutsky expressed concern that United States plans to withdraw from the Intermediate-Range Nuclear Forces Treaty would result in a new Cold War and potentially an armed confrontation.

Slutsky was a candidate for the 2024 Russian presidential election. After receiving the LDPR party nomination, Slutsky said that he does not expect to beat Putin in the election.

== Allegations of sexual harassment ==
In February 2018, BBC Russian Service reporter Farida Rustamova, TV Rain producer Daria Zhuk, former Kommersant reporter Anastasia Karimova and RTVi journalist Ekaterina Kotrikadze accused Slutsky of sexual harassment through TV Rain and BBC. The accusations were discussed in Russian media all over spring 2018. In response Slutsky compared himself to Harvey Weinstein, claimed to be the target for defamation and provocation and threatened TV Rain with legal actions.

A number of parliamentarians spoke in defense of Slutsky including so-called State Duma "female club" (co-chairmen of different political factions: Yelena Serova, Olga Yepifanova, Tamara Pletnyova, Elena Strokova) and the Duma chairman Vyacheslav Volodin who linked the accusations to political motives. The United Russia deputy Oksana Pushkina supported the female journalists and stated in a television interview with RBC that, according to her observations and experiences, sexual harassment in the State Duma had occurred in the past but it never went public.

On 8 March 2018 Slutsky congratulated women on International Women's Day in a Facebook post and apologized to "those of them to whom he voluntarily or involuntarily caused any emotional stress". RBC associated that apology with the sexual scandal in the State Duma. The same day the director of the Information and Press Department of the Ministry of Foreign Affairs of the Russian Federation, Maria Zakharova, also recalled the ambiguous behavior of Slutsky towards her.

At the end of February, the journalists from State Duma press pool approached legislature's leaders with request to discuss the behavior of Leonid Slutsky. On 21 March 2018 the State Duma Commission on Ethics, headed by Otari Arshba, reviewed testimonies and evidence provided by Rustamova, Zhuk, Karimova, Kotrikadze and Slutsky and came to the conclusion that there were no "violations of behavioral norms" in Slutsky's actions, thus exonerating Slutsky of the allegations. According to Arshba, that was the first time the commission had to review such a case and that the reasoning was limited to one person's word against another's. He also pointed out that the journalists were in the right to address the law enforcement authorities with the arguments and materials provided to the commission.

In response to the commission's decision, more than a dozen Russian news outlets announced a boycott either to Slutsky and Commission members in person or the State Duma in whole. Some newspapers like Meduza and Vedomosti in their editorial commentaries associated the decision with impunity of the authorities and noted that Slutsky should resign.

== Controversy ==
=== Property and income ===
According to official data, Slutsky's income in 2011 was 1.9 million rubles (64.6 thousand US dollars), in 2016 - 4.9 million (73.3 thousand US dollars). Together with his wife, Slutsky owns 1.2 thousand square meters of land, a house, three apartments, seaside villa at Bodrum on the southwestern Turkish coast, non-residential premises, and several cars, including a Bentley Continental Flying Spur, a Bentley Bentayga and a Mercedes-Maybach S500.

On 8 March 2018 Alexei Navalny and his Anti-Corruption Foundation (FBK) published an investigation about the property of Leonid Slutsky and accused the deputy of illegal wealth accumulation, as his family does not have an official business, and its total income is unlikely to afford the cars, with the two Bentleys costing about 30 million rubles).

In the same investigation, it is pointed out that Slutsky has been renting an area of one hectare next to the dacha in Rublevka, and has never declared it. FBK sent a request to the State Duma's profile committee and asked to renounce the deputy power of Slutsky after the investigation.

=== Traffic code violations ===
The investigation of Alexei Navalny and his the FBK states that in the period from June 2017 and March 2018, a Mercedes-Maybach S500 owned by Slutsky violated traffic rules 825 times (including driving on the oncoming lane). The fines amounted to 1.4 million rubles, which makes about 40% of his official income.

Previously, Novaya Gazeta newspaper reported that on 1 June 2013, officers of the Chief Directorate of Internal Security of the Ministry of Internal Affairs detained two inspectors of the GIBDD (General Administration for Traffic Safety), who were taking Leonid Slutsky to the airport in a car with the siren light on. Slutsky refused to explain why he was in the car of the traffic police. According to the publication, the deputy was going to fly from the government airport "Vnukovo-3" to Athos together with Patriarch Kirill.

=== Accusations of bribery ===
In January 2017, developer Sergei Polonsky appealed to Prosecutor General of Russia Yury Chaika with a demand to file criminal charges against State Duma deputies Vladimir Resin and Leonid Slutsky. According to him, two deputies extorted a bribe from him and "got 990 m² in the penthouse of the "Kutuzovskaya Riviera" for the contract registration".

=== 2022 Russian invasion of Ukraine ===
In 2022, Slutsky became a member of the Russian negotiating team following the invasion of Ukraine. His role included peace talks and negotiations on the wounded Ukrainian soldiers in the Azovstal steelworks following the end of the Siege of Mariupol. He stated that members of the Azov regiment among the captured soldiers should be executed, and that they do not deserve to live. This would involve a change in Russian law, which has had a moratorium on the death penalty since 1996, and would potentially break the Geneva Convention.

=== Russian Peace Foundation ===
Russia commissioned Slutsky's organization, the "Russian Peace Foundation", and the Polish association European Council on Democracy and Human Rights, which in the past had brought election observers from right-wing populist and right-wing extremist circles to Crimea, to organize their trips. Paid relationships are established and maintained with pro-Moscow Western politicians for Russian own interests and influence.

A partner of the Russian Peace Foundation is the German far-right political party Alternative for Germany.

Leonid Slutsky is the political curator of Șor Party. In 2024 Pro-Russian politicians from Moldova visited Russia: fugitive oligarch Ilan Șor, representatives of the Party of Socialists of the Republic of Moldova, socialist leader himself, ex-president Igor Dodon, two politicians of the Revival Party party, close to fugitive oligarch Ilan Shor.

== Personal life ==
Slutsky is married to Lidya Lyskova. He has an adult daughter from his first marriage. He has also a younger daughter.

In March 2018, journalist Anna Mongait reported that singer Zara advanced her political career and received the title of "Honored Artist of the Russian Federation" because of her relationship with Slutsky.

=== Connections with the Russian Orthodox Church ===
Slutsky has close relations with the leadership of the Russian Orthodox Church. On 11 June 2011, the day of Orthodox holiday of Pentecost, Slutsky landed on the territory of Trinity Lavra of St. Sergius on a helicopter, without having warned anyone in advance. It "caused a great deal of surprise which turned into indignation among parishioners and workers of the church". According to the deputy, he hurried to meet with Patriarch Kirill of Moscow, but because of traffic jams on the Yaroslavl highway he had to use the services of a helicopter company.

The investigation of TV Rain channel indicates that Slutsky is the chairman of the board of the charity foundation "Kronstadt Naval Cathedral", which contributed 1.3 billion rubles to restore the Naval cathedral of Saint Nicholas in the town of Kronstadt, which is a hometown of Svetlana Medvedeva. One of its board members is Vladimir Resin, who is involved in construction works for the Russian Orthodox Church. In 2013 alone, more than one billion rubles of donations were spent on building churches through the fund's accounts.

Andrei Kononov, the general director of the fund, is an assistant to Slutsky on a voluntary basis. The investigation assumes that the fund financed the rebels of the Donetsk People's Republic. Kononov also met with the leadership of the unrecognized republic, bringing priests and icons with him.

Another non-transparent fund of Slutsky's, the "Russian Peace Foundation", is mentioned in the investigation. Its Saratov department was involved in fraud with land and, among other things, it got a lease on a pond, where, according to the documents, it planned to build a children's car-racing track.
