= Boris Chernyshov =

Russian politician (born 1991)

Boris Chernyshov MP
- Борис Чернышов
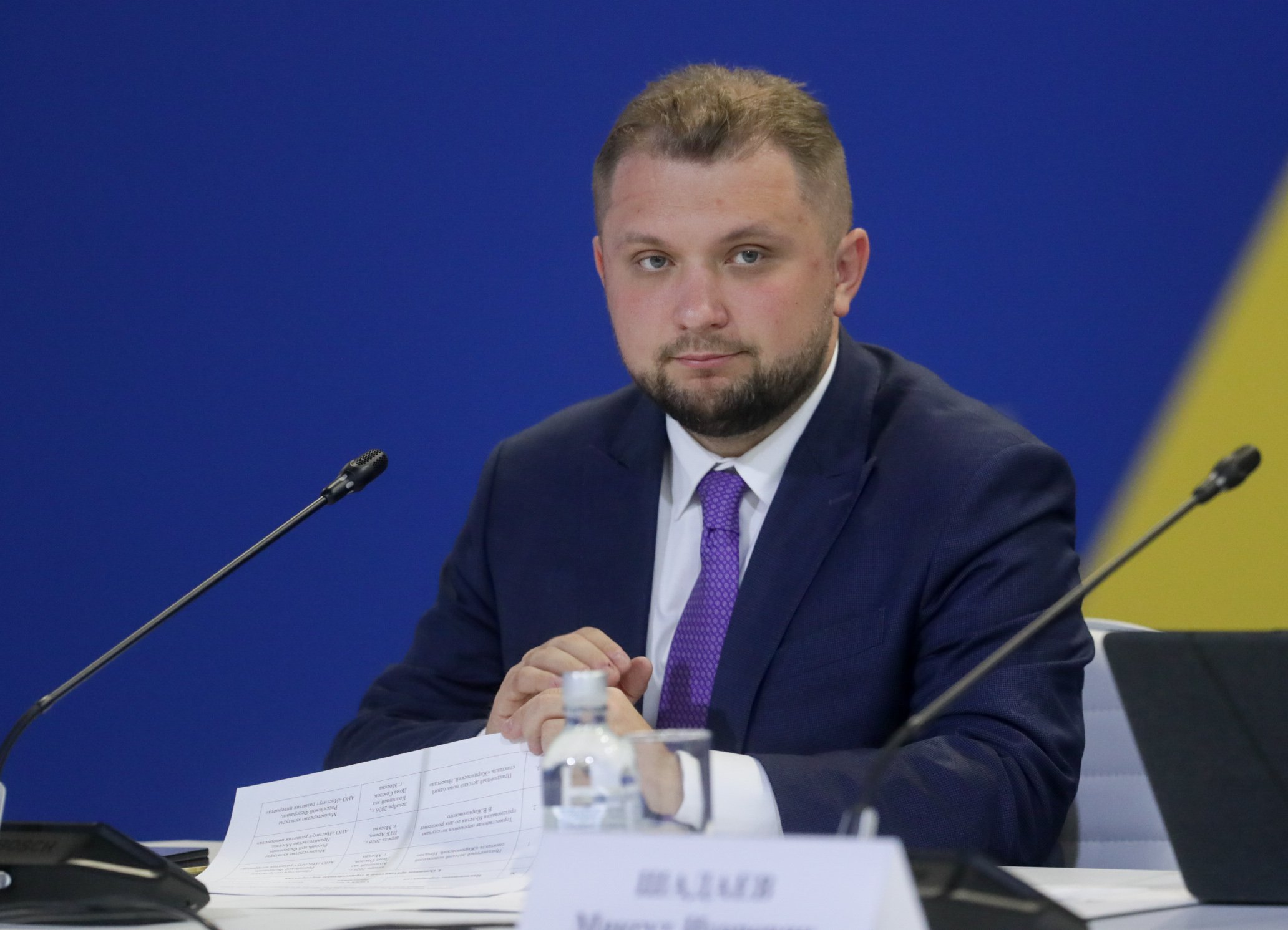
- Chernyshov in 2024

Member of the State Duma (Party List Seat)
- Incumbent
- Assumed office 5 October 2016

Personal details
- Born: 25 June 1991 (age 35) Voronezh, RSFSR, USSR
- Party: Liberal Democratic Party of Russia
- Education: HSE University; Moscow State University; Russian State Social University; Skolkovo Moscow School of Management
- Occupation: Politician

Boris Aleksandrovich Chernyshov (Russian: Борис Александрович Чернышов; born 25 June 1991) is a Russian politician, a deputy of the 7th State Duma of the Russian Federation.

== Biography ==
=== Education ===
- 2012 — graduated from HSE University;
- 2014 — graduated from Lomonosov Moscow State University;
- 2018 — graduated from Russian State Social University;
- 2021 — graduated from Moscow School of Management SKOLKOVO.

=== Early career ===
Prior to election to the State Duma, Chernyshov was coordinator of the Moscow branch of the Liberal Democratic Party of Russia (LDPR). In this role, he organized a public protest in front of the Turkish Embassy against the 2015 Russian Sukhoi Su-24 shootdown by a Turkish Air Force F-16 fighter jet.

=== State Duma of the Russian Federation ===
In 2016, Chernyshov was elected as a deputy in the State Duma, the lower house of the Federal Assembly of Russia. He is a representative for the Orekhovo–Borisovo constituency in Moscow. His first day in office was September 18, 2016. He is also the Deputy Chairman of the Committee on Education and Science.

Chernyshov drafted two bills in November 2016 to regulate electronic cigarettes. He proposed banning sales to minors, prohibiting vaping in certain public areas such as parks, and creating regulations to avoid harmful ingredients.

In November 2016, Chernyshov and fellow LDPR deputy Vasily Vlasov prepared a bill to lower the voting age in Russia from 18 to 16. This has been a policy of the LDPR since 2014, reflecting the popularity of the party among young people. However, the bill was swiftly rejected by the Russian government.

In January 2017, Boris Chernyshov introduced a bill to the State Duma proposing changes to the system of final state assessment in education. The initiative included allowing male applicants with secondary vocational education to enroll in teacher training universities without entrance examinations, with the stated aim of increasing the number of male teachers in schools.

In June 2023, Boris Chernyshov introduced a draft law titled “On Fair Pricing” to the State Duma. The bill proposed amendments to Article 10 of the Law of the Russian Federation “On Protection of Consumer Rights”, requiring retailers to display the price per kilogram or per liter on product labels. The bill was rejected by the State Duma in November 2023.

Boris Chernyshov is a co-author of a draft law titled “On the Zero First Job”, which proposes recognizing internships as official work experience.

== Russia–United States relations ==
In March 2026, Boris Chernyshov, as part of a delegation from the State Duma, visited the United States at the invitation of U.S. Congresswoman Anna Paulina Luna. The parties discussed issues of international security and economic cooperation. Chernyshov described the opening of dialogue with the United States Congress as “promising”. According to Reuters, the visit marked the first trip by Russian lawmakers to the United States in several years following the breakdown in relations after the war in Ukraine.

=== Sanctions ===
He was sanctioned by the UK government in 2022 in relation to the Russo-Ukrainian War.

On 24 March 2022, the United States Treasury sanctioned him in response to the 2022 Russian invasion of Ukraine.

Since February 25, 2022, he has been under sanctions imposed by Switzerland. Since February 26, 2022, he has been under Australian sanctions. On April 12, 2022, Japan also imposed sanctions against him.

By the decree of Ukrainian president Volodymyr Zelenskyy dated September 7, 2022, he was placed under Ukrainian sanctions.

Since May 3, 2022, he has also been subject to sanctions by New Zealand.
