= Yaroslav Nilov =

Russian politician

Yaroslav Nilov MP
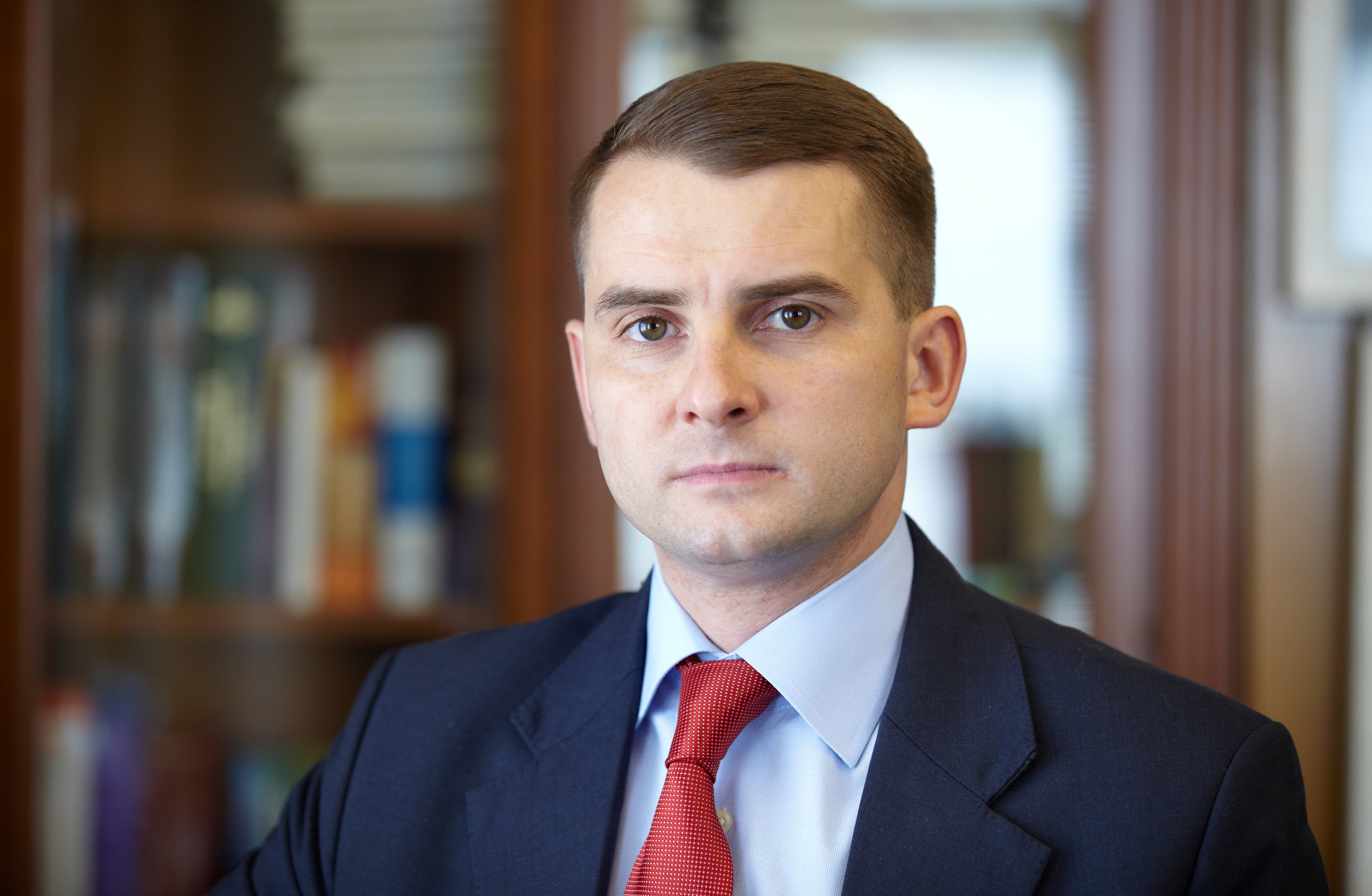

Chairman of the State Duma committee on labour, social policy and veterans affairs
- Incumbent
- Assumed office 5 October 2016
- Preceded by: Olga Batalina

Member of the State Duma
- Incumbent
- Assumed office 14 July 2011
- Preceded by: Mikhail Pitkevich
- Constituency: Russia

Personal details
- Born: 20 March 1982 (age 44) Chișinău, Moldovan SSR, Soviet Union
- Party: Liberal Democratic Party of Russia (1997-2025); Non-partisan (from 2025)
- Education: Moscow Energy Institute; RANEPA
- Religion: Russian Orthodox

Yaroslav Yevgenyevich Nilov (Russian: Ярослав Евгеньевич Нилов; born 20 March 1982) is a Russian politician. He has been the chairman of the State Duma Russia committee on labour, social policy and veterans affairs from 5 October 2016.

He is a deputy of the State Duma of the Russian Federation and former deputy Head of the LDPR faction. On June 25, 2025, he was expelled from the LDPR party and faction.

== Biography ==
Nilov was born on 20 March 1982 in Chișinău, Moldovan SSR. joined the Liberal Democratic Party of Russia in 1997 after which he helped create the party's young wing in the Lyuberetsky District. In 2005, he graduated from the Moscow Power Engineering Institute.

From 1998 to 2003, Nilov was an assistant to LDPR leader Vladimir Zhirinovsky and created the youth organization "Center for Youth Initiatives". From 2003 to 2007, Nilov was continue as an assistant Zhirinovsky who at that time held the post of deputy chairman of the State Duma. From 2007 to 2011, Nilov was the Head of the Secretariat of Deputy Chairman of the State Duma Vladimir Zhirinovsky.

In March 2016, Zhirinovsky named Nilov, now a member of the LDPR Supreme Council, one of his possible successors.

== Legislative Activity ==
Nilov is considered one of the most effective deputies according to the Integrated Rating of State Duma Deputies. At the end of 2024, he ranked 4th among all deputies and 1st within his parliamentary faction. In the first quarter of 2025, he ranked 3rd overall and 1st in his faction.

The final ranking is based on several criteria: the People's Voting Index (reflecting a deputy’s ability to mobilize supporters), legislative activity in the Duma, media presence (number of media mentions), and regional performance (expert evaluation of a deputy’s work in their constituency).

During his time in the State Duma, he co-authored over 400 legislative initiatives, including more than 250 during the 7th convocation. Notable proposals include:

- Reducing the maximum allowable share of citizens’ income spent on utility payments to 15%;
- Lowering personal income tax (PIT) rates for low-income individuals;
- Decriminalizing excessive self-defense in cases where citizens defend their home or apartment.

=== Sanctions ===
On 24 March 2022, the United States Treasury sanctioned him in response to the 2022 Russian invasion of Ukraine.

He was sanctioned by the UK government in 2022 in relation to the Russo-Ukrainian War.
