= Liberal Democratic Party of Russia =

Political party in Russia

Liberal Democratic Party of Russia Либерально-демократическая партия России
- Abbreviation: LDPR; ЛДПР
- Chairman: Leonid Slutsky
- Deputy Head of the Supreme Council: Alexey Ostrovsky
- State Duma faction leader: Leonid Slutsky
- State Duma faction's apparatus head: Maxim Zaytsev
- Founder: Vladimir Zhirinovsky
- Founded: 18 April 1992; 34 years ago
- Preceded by: Liberal Democratic Party of the Soviet Union (LDPSU)
- Headquarters: 1st Basmanny Lane, 3 building 1, Moscow
- Newspaper: For the Russian People
- Youth wing: Youth Organization of LDPR
- Membership (2019): 295,018
- Ideology: Russian ultranationalism; Right-wing populism; Social conservatism; Pan-Slavism; Anti-Americanism
- Political position: Right-wing to far-right
- International affiliation: World Congress of Patriotic Parties (2003)
- Affiliated parties: Liberal Democratic Party of Belarus; Liberal Democratic Party of Transnistria
- Colours: Yellow and blue (official); Light blue (customary)
- Slogan: Freedom, Patriotism, Law (Russian: «Свобода, патриотизм, закон»)
- Anthem: LDPR — Velikaya Rossiya! (ЛДПР — Великая Россия!)
- Seats in the Federation Council: 3 / 178
- Seats in the State Duma: 21 / 450
- Governors: 0 / 85
- Seats in the Regional Parliaments: 236 / 3,928
- Ministers: 1 / 31

Party flag

Website
- ldpr.ru

LDPR – Liberal Democratic Party of Russia (Note: Russian: ЛДПР – Либерально-демократическая партия России, romanized: LDPR – Liberalno-demokraticheskaya partiya Rossii) is a Russian ultranationalist and right-wing populist political party. It succeeded the Liberal Democratic Party of the Soviet Union (LDPSU) in Russia after the dissolution of the Soviet Union. The party was led by Vladimir Zhirinovsky since its inception until his death in April 2022. Opposing both communism and state capitalism of the 1990s, the party scored a major success in the 1993 Duma elections with almost 23% of the vote, giving it 64 seats of the 450 seats in the State Duma. In the 2021 elections, the party received 7.55% of the vote, giving it 21 seats.

Despite the party's name, it has been described as "neither liberal nor democratic nor a party". The LDPR was centered around Zhirinovsky, and is often described as populist, nationalist, or ultranationalist. It has been described as adhering to statism and authoritarianism, and has also been described as fascist, though this label has been disputed. The party, as part of the "systemic opposition", is considered to be traditionally loyal to the Kremlin. Besides the aforementioned accusations, it has also been described as right-liberal. The party has been a part of the federal government since May 14, 2024, with Mikhail Degtyarev serving as Minister of Sport. Its members are generally called "zhirinovets" (Russian: жириновец, lit. 'Zhirinovite').

== History ==
Former version of the logo

=== Creation ===
==== Liberal Democratic Party of the Soviet Union ====
An effectively multi-party system emerged in the Soviet Union in the late 1980s in wake of Mikhail Gorbachev's reforms. A formal law for this purpose was introduced in October 1990. In April 1991, the Liberal Democratic Party of the Soviet Union (LDPSU) became the second officially registered political party in the country.

Former KGB General Filipp Bobkov has stated that "in line with Zubatov's ideas," the Central Committee of the Communist Party of the Soviet Union "proposed creating a pseudo-party controlled by the KGB" to direct the interests and sentiments of certain social groups, however he said that he was against the idea. Former Politburo member Alexander Yakovlev described how KGB director Vladimir Kryuchkov proposed the creation of the party with Soviet leader Mikhail Gorbachev at a meeting. He also stated that the Central Committee took over which led to the creation of the Liberal Democratic Party. Yakovlev called the creation of the party a joint effort of the Central Committee and the KGB. In the early 1990s, Mayor of Saint Petersburg, Anatoly Sobchak claimed that party leader Vladimir Zhirinovsky was a "reserve" KGB captain, and a number of key supporters in the LDPR leadership quit the party, accusing Zhirinovsky of KGB ties.

The outspoken leader of the party, Vladimir Zhirinovsky, an effective media performer, gained 8% of votes during the 1991 presidential elections. He also supported the August 1991 coup attempt.

==== Liberal Democratic Party of Russia ====
In 1992, the LDPSU broke apart into its regional offsprings and the Liberal Democratic Party of Russia (LDPR) was created as its successor in Russia.

=== Zhirinovsky's leadership ===
==== 1993–1999 ====
In the 1993 Duma elections, the pro-reform party supporting President Boris Yeltsin, Russia's Choice, received only 15% of the vote and the new Communist Party of the Russian Federation only 12.4%. The LDPR emerged as the winner with 22.9% of the popular vote. In effect, the Russian population was divided between those who supported Yeltsin's reforms and to those who did not. It is regarded that the popularity of Zhirinovsky and his party arose from the electorate's dissatisfaction with Yeltsin and their desire for a non-communist solution.

Zhirinovsky is credited with having successfully identified the problems of ordinary Russians and offering simple remedies to solve them. For example, he has suggested that all leaders of organized crime should be shot and all Chechens deported from Russia. Zhirinovsky also called for territorial expansion of Russia. Many of Zhirinovsky's views are highly controversial and the LDPR's success in the early 1990s shocked observers both inside and outside Russia.

The Duma elected in 1993 was as an interim solution and its mandate expired in 1995. During the two years, Zhirinovsky's popularity waned and his party's support was halved in the 1995 elections (11.2%). The Communists emerged as the winners, with 22.3% of the vote.

In the presidential elections of 1996, the LDPR nominated Vladimir Zhirinovsky as a candidate. Zhirinovsky gained 5.7% of the votes in the first round.

In 1999, the party participated in the elections as a "Bloc of Zhirinovsky" since the Central Election Commission initially refused to register in the election lists of LDPR, which received 6.0% of the votes. In the 3rd State Duma, Zhirinovsky took up the post of Deputy Chair of the State Duma and the post of the head of the faction occupied by his son Igor Lebedev.

==== 2000–2009 ====
In the presidential election of 2000, the party again put forward Vladimir Zhirinovsky, who won 2.7% of votes.

In the parliamentary elections of 2003, the party won 11.5% of the votes and received 36 seats.

In the 2004 presidential election, the LDPR nominated Oleg Malyshkin. The party leader Vladimir Zhirinovsky was hoping to take the post of Prime Minister of Russia in case of Malyshkin's victory on elections. In the end, Malyshkin scored 2% of votes, having lost the election.

In the legislative elections in 2007, the LDPR received 5,660,823 votes (8.14%) and received 40 seats in the State Duma.

In the 2008 presidential election, Zhirinovsky was re-nominated as a candidate and scored 9.4% of the vote.

==== 2010–2019 ====
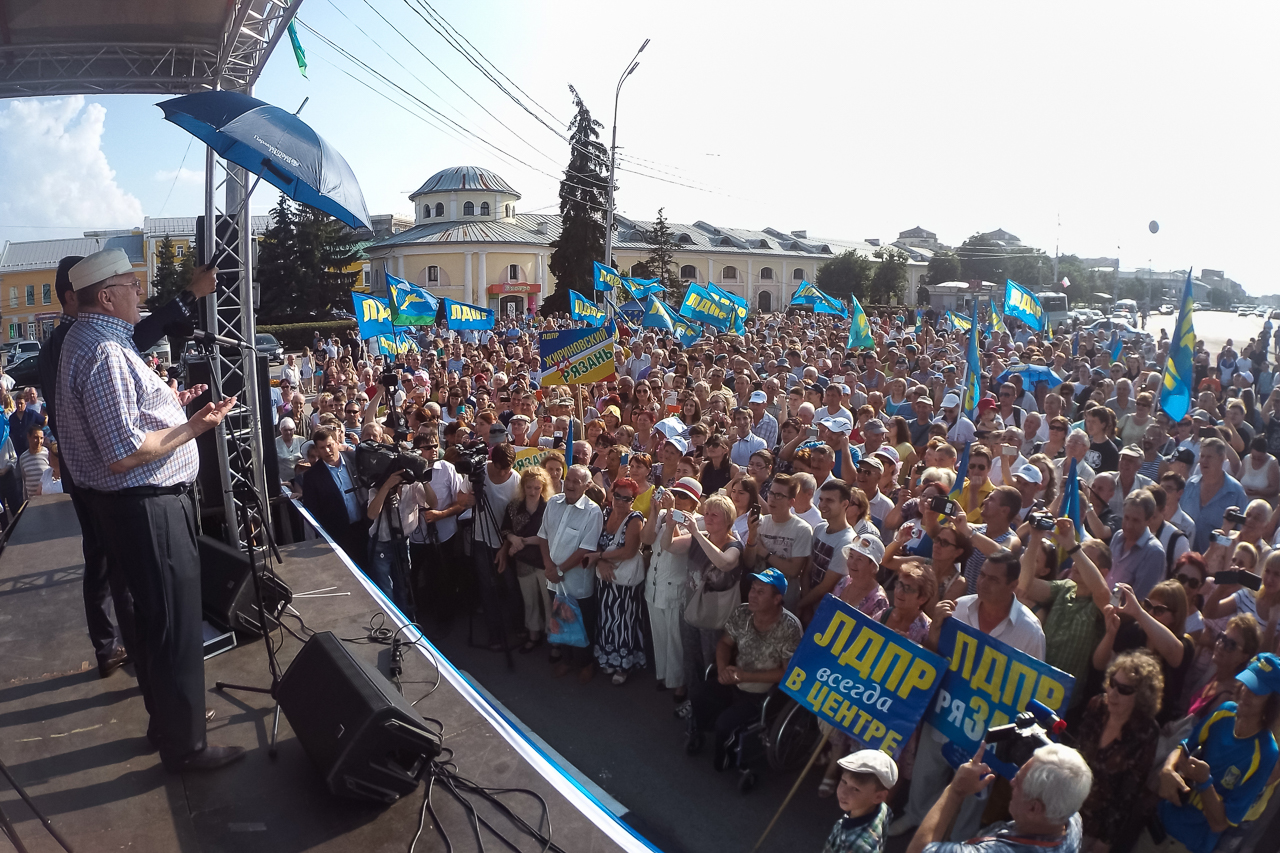
Vladimir Zhirinovsky speaks at an rally during the party's 2016 legislative election campaign in Ryazan

In the parliamentary elections of 2011, the party scored 11.7% of the vote and won 56 seats. In the 6th State Duma, Vladimir Zhirinovsky returned to the post of head of the LDPR faction and his son Igor Lebedev has held the position of Vice Chairman of the State Duma. In these elections the LDPR gained over one-fifth of votes in Russian Far East (e. g. Primorsky Krai).

In the presidential elections 2012, the party again put forward by Zhirinovsky, whose campaign slogan for 2012 was "Vote Zhirinovsky, or things will get worse". Proshka, a donkey owned by Zhirinovsky, became prominent during the presidential campaign when he was filmed in an election advertisement video. On the last episode of debates with Mikhail Prokhorov just before the elections, Zhirinovsky produced a scandal by calling those Russian celebrities which supported Prokhorov, including a pop-diva and a veteran of Russian pop scene Alla Pugacheva, "prostitutes" ("I thought you are an artful person, politician, cunning man, but you are just a clown and a psycho", replied Pugacheva. "I am what I am. And such is my charm", replied Zhirinovsky). As a result, Zhirinovsky gained 6.2% of the votes.

During the diplomatic crisis following the 2015 Russian Sukhoi Su-24 shootdown by Turkey, Zhirinovsky suggested to bomb the Bosporus with nuclear weapons.

In the parliamentary elections in 2016, the party improved its result compared to the previous elections. The LDPR surpassed the center-left party A Just Russia, becoming the third largest party in the State Duma. The LDPR won 39 seats, gaining 13.1% of the vote, nearly reaching the second placed Communist Party, which won 13.3% of votes and 42 seats. Also, the party gained single-member constituencies in Russian Far East (notably in Khabarovsk Krai).

In 2015, Zhirinovsky expressed a desire to participate in the presidential elections in 2018. In the past, key figures in the LDPR other than Zhirinovsky had been discussed as potential presidential candidates, such as Zhirinovsky's son Igor Lebedev as well as his close associates Mikhail Degtyarev, Yaroslav Nilov and Alexei Didenko. After the parliamentary elections of 2016, Zhirinovsky said he would run himself.

==== 2020–2022 ====
On 9 July 2020, the popular governor of the Khabarovsk Krai and member of the LDPR, Sergei Furgal, who defeated the candidate of Putin's United Russia party in elections two years previously, was arrested and flown to Moscow on charges of involvement in the murders of several businessmen in 2004 and 2005. He denied the allegations. Starting on 11 June, mass protests were held in Khabarovsk Krai in support of Furgal. On 20 July, President Vladimir Putin dismissed Furgal from his position of governor and appointed Moscow-based politician Mikhail Degtyarev, who is also a member of the LDPR, as acting governor. Several regional lawmakers in Khabarovsk opted to leave the LDPR in protest against Furgal's dismissal. The protests included chants of "shame on LDPR", with LDPR loyalists outraged at the party leadership's failure to rally around Furgal.

==== Zhirinovsky's death ====
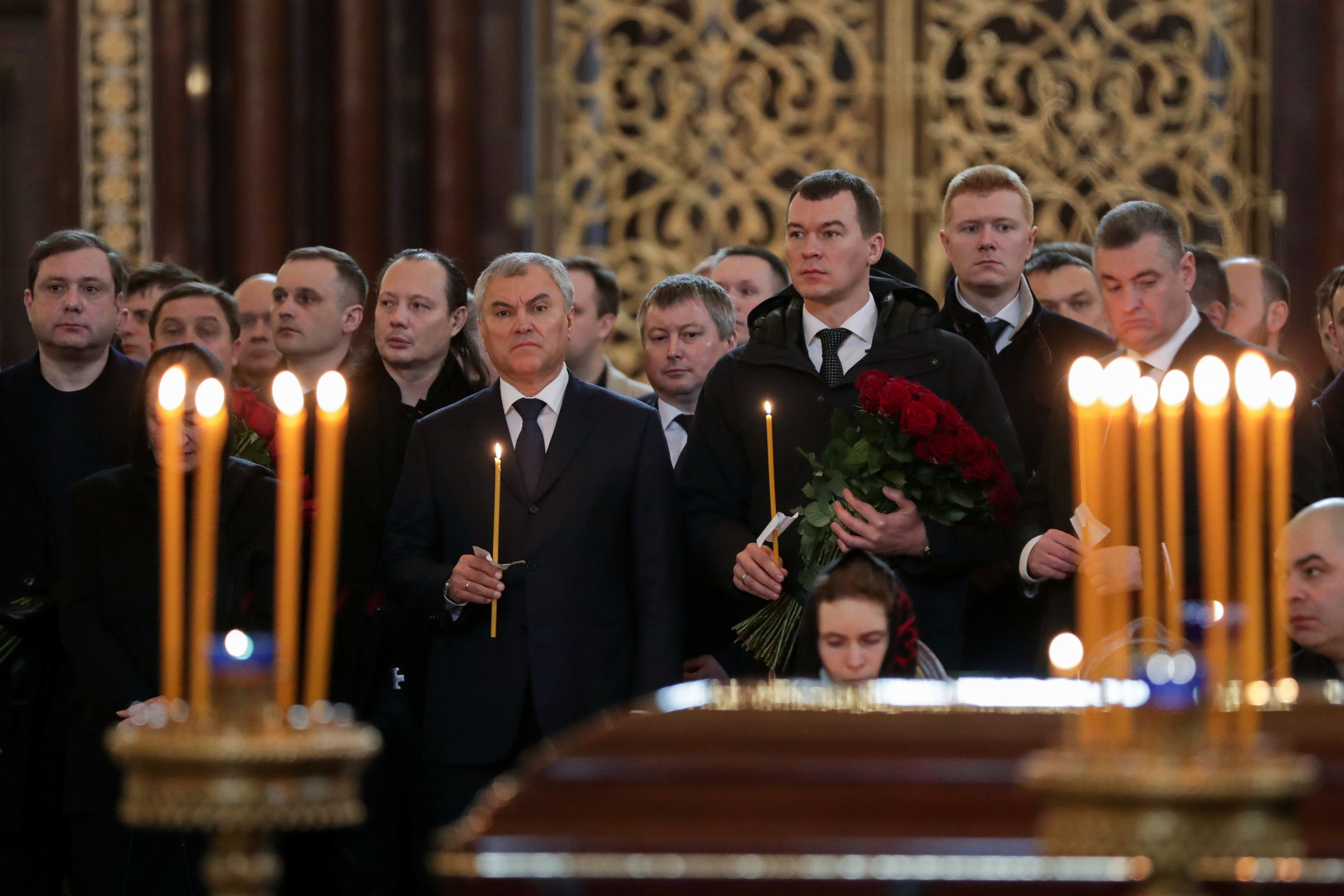
Party members and State Duma Speaker Vyacheslav Volodin at the funeral service of Zhirinovsky

In February 2022, Zhirinovsky was hospitalized in critical condition in Moscow with COVID-19. In March, he was reportedly placed in a medically induced coma, and underwent treatment for COVID-19 complications such as sepsis and respiratory failure. Zhirinovsky claimed to have been vaccinated against COVID-19 eight times.

On 25 March 2022, Zhirinovsky was reported to have died in a hospital. Despite confirmation from several sources, including his own political party, the news was quickly denied by family members. On 6 April 2022, Vyacheslav Volodin, the Speaker of the Duma, announced that Zhirinovsky had died following a long illness. He was 75.

After Zhirinovsky's death, Leonid Slutsky, the head of the State Duma Committee on International Affairs, was elected party leader.

=== Slutsky's leadership ===
==== Election ====
In May 2022, an extraordinary congress of the party was held, at which its new leader was elected. Initially, Leonid Slutsky and Khabarovsk Governor Mikhail Degtyarev were considered the main candidates. However, shortly before the congress, Degtyarev declined to run for party leader and publicly endorsed Slutsky. Other persons who declared their intention to run for the leadership of the party were not allowed to vote. In this connection, Slutsky was elected the new leader of the party on an uncontested basis.

==== 2022–present ====
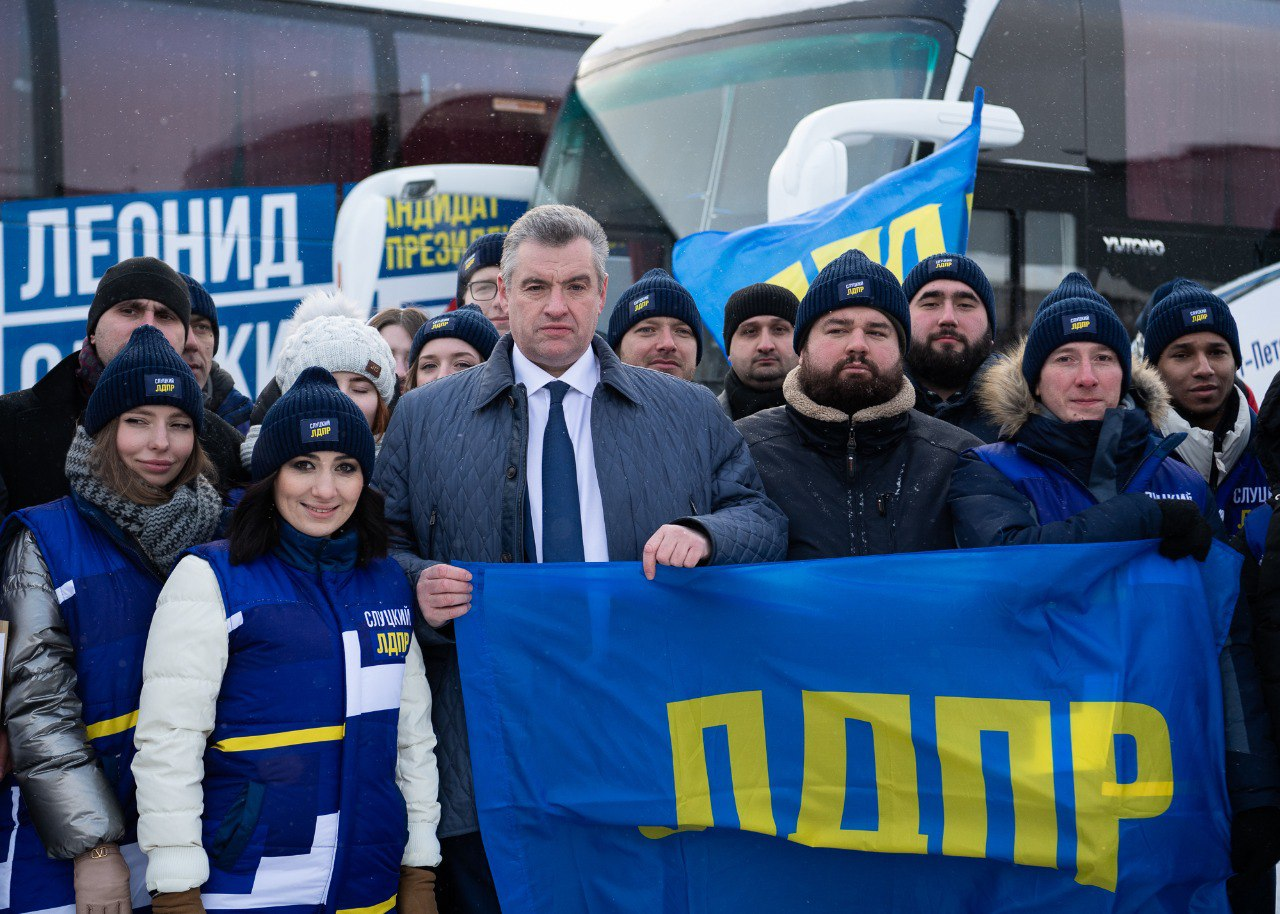
Slutsky during his 2024 presidential campaign

In 2024, Slutsky was nominated as the party's presidential candidate. Speculation about Slutsky's possible intention to run for president began immediately after his election as party leader. At the same time, Slutsky himself refused to give a clear answer about his participation in the elections, stating only that the party would definitely nominate its presidential candidate.

According to media reports, the nomination of Slutsky was the main option for the party's participation in the election. In addition, according to political scientists, participation in the elections was necessary for Slutsky to strengthen his position in the party. If Zhirinovsky was one of the founders and the undisputed party leader, then Slutsky did not have such authority, and he had to fight several intra-party groups at once, including Alexei Didenko and Yaroslav Nilov, who previously were removed by Slutsky from leadership positions in the party's apparatus, and also such as Boris Chernyshov, Deputy Chairman of the State Duma and 2023 candidate for Mayor of Moscow, applying for the post of party leader.

In May 2024, when the second Mishustin government was formed, Mikhail Degtyarev was appointed Russian Minister of Sport. Degtyarev became the first Liberal Democratic Party member to join the government since 1999.

A number of Russian media outlets noted that Slutsky had purged the party of disloyal politicians. So, in December 2023, former State Duma deputy Vasily Vlasov, who was one of Zhirinovsky's closest associates, was expelled from the Liberal Democratic Party. In June 2025, Yaroslav Nilov was expelled from the party, whom Zhirinovsky publicly announced as one of his possible successors.

== Political positions ==
The LDPR seeks "a revival of Russia as a great power". It opposes both communism and capitalism, preferring a mixed economy with private ownership, but with a strong management role reserved for the state. In foreign policy, the party places a strong emphasis on "civilizations". It has supported the restoration of Russia with its "natural borders" (which the party believes include Transcaucasia, Central Asia, Belarus and Ukraine). The LDPR regards the United States and NATO as Russia's main external threats.

The party has harshly criticised the discrimination against ethnic Russians in the Baltic states and demanded that they should be given Russian citizenship and protected against discriminatory legislation. The LDPR is also against corruption and any enlargement of the European Union, identifying as a Eurosceptic party, instead preferring pan-Slavism. Professor Henry E. Hale lists the party's main policy stands as nationalism and a focus in law and order.

Although it often uses radical opposition rhetoric, the LDPR frequently votes for government proposals. This has led to speculation that the party receives funding from the Kremlin. Political parties in Russia that have broken the 3% voting barrier and entered the parliament (State Duma) are officially financed by government, according to federal law. As such, all opposition parties in the State Duma are largely funded by the federal budget (e.g. in 2018, LDPR received 99.7% of its funding from the government, CPRF 90%, and A Just Russia 81%).

Zhirinovsky had stated that he wants to see a monarch titled "supreme ruler" lead Russia and had promised to shoot his political opponents if elected president.

== Structure and membership ==
The party's organization was almost entirely centered on its former leader Vladimir Zhirinovsky, who died on 6 April 2022.

The party is in alliance with several parties in the former Soviet republics, including Armenia, Belarus, Estonia and Ukraine.

In 2003, the party claimed 600,000 members and had issued 475,000 party cards. According to a 2008 survey by Colton, Hale and McFaul, 4% of the Russian population are loyalists of the party.

=== Party leaders ===
No.	Leader (birth–death)	Took office	Left office	Tenure
1	Vladimir Zhirinovsky (1946–2022)	18 April 1992	6 April 2022 (died in office)	29 years, 353 days
―	Leonid Slutsky (b. 1968)	6 April 2022	27 May 2022	51 days
2	Leonid Slutsky (b. 1968)	27 May 2022 (elected)	Incumbent	4 years, 143 days

== Electoral results ==
=== Presidential ===
Election	Candidate	First round		Second round		Result
Election	Candidate	Votes	%	Votes	%	Result
1991	Vladimir Zhirinovsky	6,211,007	7.81			Lost
1996	Vladimir Zhirinovsky	4,311,479	5.70			Lost
2000	Vladimir Zhirinovsky	2,026,513	2.70			Lost
2004	Oleg Malyshkin	1,405,315	2.02			Lost
2008	Vladimir Zhirinovsky	6,988,510	9.35			Lost
2012	Vladimir Zhirinovsky	4,458,103	6.22			Lost
2018	Vladimir Zhirinovsky	4,154,985	5.65			Lost
2024	Leonid Slutsky	2,795,629	3.24			Lost

=== State Duma ===
Election	Leader	Votes	%	Seats	+/–	Rank	Government
1993	Vladimir Zhirinovsky	12,318,562	22.92	64 / 450		1st	Opposition
1995	Vladimir Zhirinovsky	7,737,431	11.18	51 / 450	▼13	▼3rd	Opposition (1995–98)
1995	Vladimir Zhirinovsky	7,737,431	11.18	51 / 450	▼13	▼3rd	Coalition (1998–99)
1995	Vladimir Zhirinovsky	7,737,431	11.18	51 / 450	▼13	▼3rd	Support (1999)
1999	Vladimir Zhirinovsky	3,990,038	5.98	17 / 450	▼34	▼5th	Support
2003	Vladimir Zhirinovsky	6,944,322	11.45	36 / 450	▲19	▲3rd	Support
2007	Vladimir Zhirinovsky	5,660,823	8.14	40 / 450	▲4	3rd	Support
2011	Vladimir Zhirinovsky	7,664,570	11.67	56 / 450	▲16	▼4th	Support
2016	Vladimir Zhirinovsky	6,917,063	13.14	39 / 450	▼17	▲3rd	Support
2021	Vladimir Zhirinovsky	4,252,096	7.55	21 / 450	▼18	▼4th	Support (2021–2024)
2021	Vladimir Zhirinovsky	4,252,096	7.55	21 / 450	▼18	▼4th	Coalition (2024–2026)
2026	Leonid Slutsky	5,970,578	9.01	23 / 450	▲2	▲3rd	Coalition

== See also ==
- Liberal Democratic Party of Belarus
- Liberal Democratic Party of Transnistria
- List of Liberal Democratic Party of Russia deputies in the State Duma
- Miflaga Mitkademet Liberalit Demokratit
- Serbian Radical Party
