= Alexei Didenko =

Russian politician (born 1983)

Alexei Didenko MP
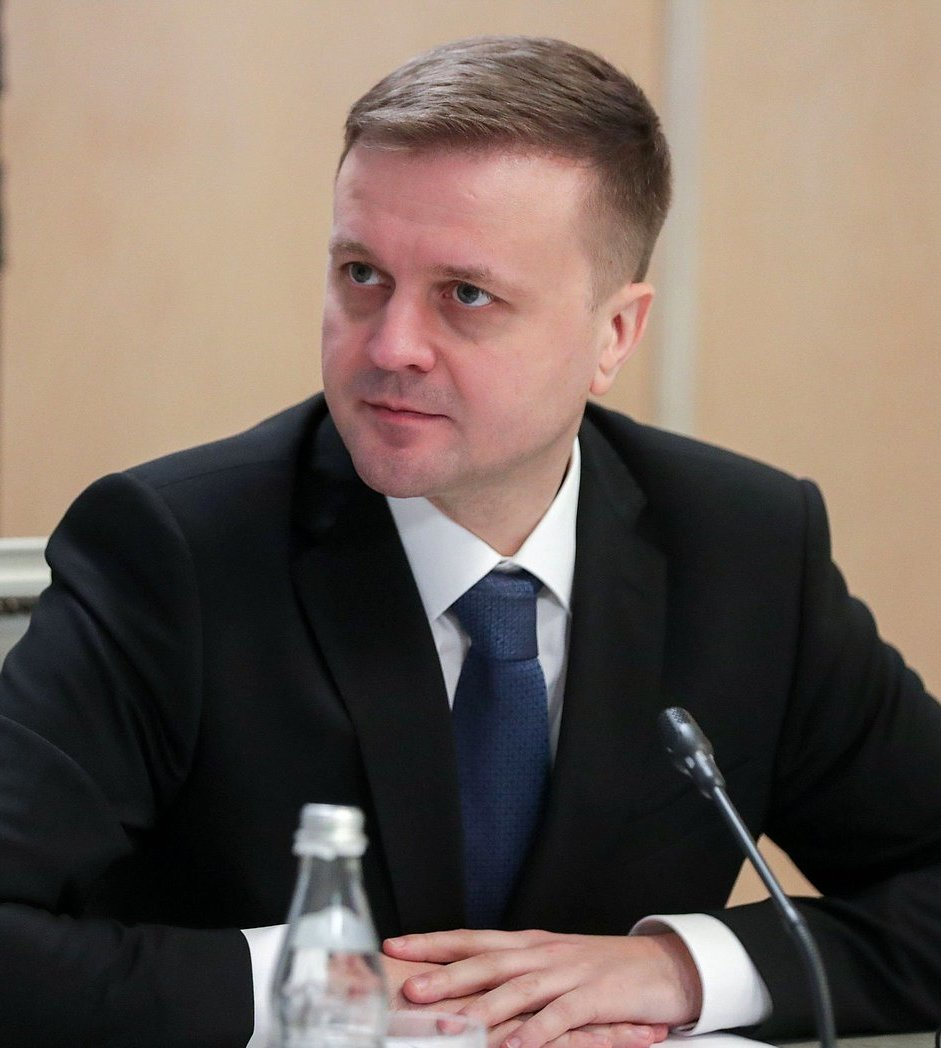

Chairman of the State Duma committee on regional policy and local self-government
- Incumbent
- Assumed office 5 October 2016
- Preceded by: Viktor Kidyayev

Member of the State Duma
- Incumbent
- Assumed office 21 December 2011
- Preceded by: constituency re-established
- Constituency: Tomsk (No. 181)

Personal details
- Born: 30 March 1983 (age 43) Pochapintsy, Lysianka Raion, Cherkasy Oblast, Ukrainian SSR, Soviet Union
- Party: Liberal Democratic Party of Russia
- Education: Tomsk State University (2005)

Alexei Nikolayevich Didenko (Russian: Алексей Николаевич Диденко; born 30 March 1983) is a Russian politician. Chairman of the State Duma Russia committee on regional policy and local self-government from 5 October 2016.

From 2007 to 2010, he was deputy of the Tomsk Oblast Duma. Since 2011, he has been a deputy in the State Duma of the Russian Federation. He is a member of the Duma Committee on Constitutional Legislation and State Building. He is a leading member of the Liberal Democratic Party of Russia.

== Early life ==
Alexei Didenko was born on 30 March 1983 to Nikolai in the village of Pochapintsy in Cherkasy region of Ukraine. Alexei later moved with his family to Tomsk where he attended high school from 1990 to 1993. He graduated from “Russian classical school No. 2” in 2000.

== Education ==
In 2005, Didenko graduated from the Law Institute of Tomsk State University. In the same year, he became of the coordinator of Tomsk regional branch of the Liberal Democratic Party of Russia.

== Member of parliament ==
In the 2016 election, Didenko won the Tomsk constituency No. 181. Earlier, TASS reported that LDPR concluded an agreement with United Russia that it will not nominate anyone in Tomsk to ease Didenko's election, and that the rector of Tomsk State University of Architecture and Construction Viktor Vlasov, winner of the United Russia primary, will not run for constituency.

In September 2017, Didenko ran for governor of Tomsk Oblast. He took second place, gaining 19.38% of the vote cast. Alexei Didenko headed the campaign headquarters of Vladimir Zhirinovsky in 2018 presidential election. On 30 March 2022 he was appointed first deputy chairman of the LDPR Central Office.

== Awards ==
- Order of Friendship
- Medal of the Order "For Merit to the Fatherland", 2nd degree
- Medal "For the Return of Crimea"
- Medal "Participant of the military operation in Syria"
- Russian Federation Presidential Certificate of Honour

== Family ==
His father, Nikolai Vasilyevich Didenko (born 1959), is a Russian statesman. He was the deputy mayor of Tomsk, vice mayor of Novosibirsk. Since 2015, he has been the head of the Seversk district of the Tomsk region.

His wife is Maria Didenko.
