= Vladimir Zhirinovsky 2018 presidential campaign =

Russian presidential campaign

Vladimir Zhirinovsky for President
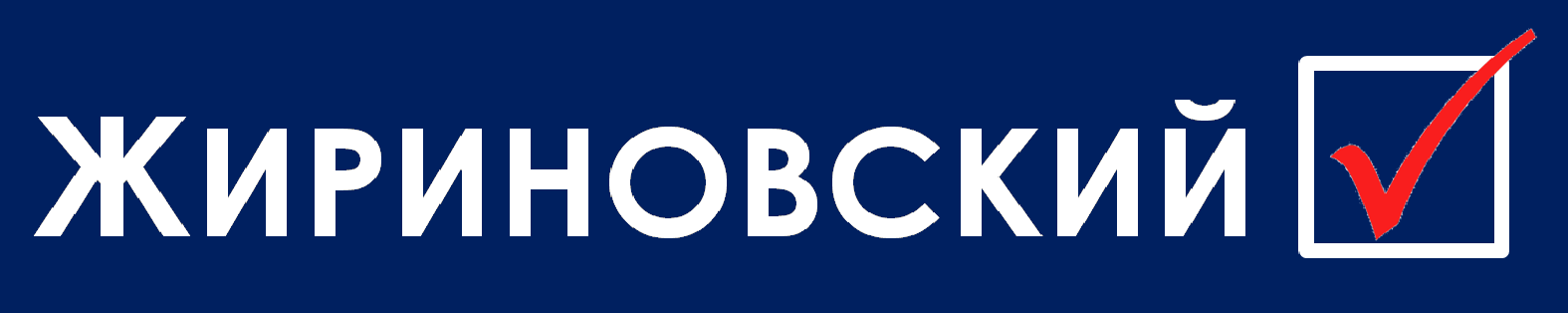
- Campaign: 2018 Russian presidential election
- Candidate: Vladimir Zhirinovsky
- Affiliation: Liberal Democratic Party
- Status: Announced: 28 October 2016; Official nominee: 20 December 2017; Registered candidate: 29 December 2017; Lost election: 18 March 2018
- Headquarters: Moscow
- Key people: Chief of staff: Alexei Didenko
- Receipts: 200,001,004.20 roubles
- Slogan: Мощный рывок вперёд (A Powerful Leap Forward)

The 2018 presidential campaign of Vladimir Zhirinovsky, deputy of the State Duma and leader of the Liberal Democratic Party, was announced on 28 October 2016. Zhirinovsky was officially nominated on 20 December 2017 at the Liberal Democratic Party's 31st annual congress. He submitted to the Central Election Commission the documents required for registration the next day.

According to Mikhail Degtyarev, Zhirinovsky planned to hold the largest campaign in the history of the party. The party's objective was to get Zhirinovsky into the second round, and then win it.

== Background ==
In June 2015, Zhirinovsky said he planned to participate in presidential elections, but in July of the same year, the politician said that the Liberal Democratic Party, perhaps "will pick a more efficient person." In March 2016, he announced the names of those who were likely to be nominated as the candidate from the Liberal Democratic Party. This included Deputy Chairman of the State Duma Igor Lebedev or deputies Mikhail Degtyarev, Yaroslav Nilov and Alexei Didenko. However, later, Zhirinovsky said that he will run himself.

Zhirinovsky was running for president for the sixth time. Previously he was a candidate in the elections of 1991, 1996, 2000, 2008 and 2012. His best result was in 2008 when he achieved 6,988,510 votes (9.5%), finishing third.

== Campaign ==
As part of his election campaign Zhirinovsky visited Volgograd and laid flowers on the statue for the Battle of Stalingrad and also met with students. On 24 November 2017, the website of the Liberal Democratic Party published Zhirinovsky's program, which is called "100 Steps: It's Time to Make a Powerful Leap Forward!"

== Proposed Cabinet ==
On 19 February 2018, Vladimir Zhirinovsky presented a part of the shadow cabinet, which would have needed to be appointed in the case of a victory of Zhirinovsky in the election.

In total, the Cabinet includes more than 50 people, in addition to members of the Liberal Democratic Party, the office of three Deputy Prime Ministers reserved for other parliamentary parties, as well as from 3 to 5 vacancies for representatives of other parties and representatives of the professional community.

Office	Image	Name	Party
Prime Minister		Alexey Ostrovsky	Liberal Democratic Party
First Deputy Prime Minister		Alexei Didenko	Liberal Democratic Party
Deputy Prime Minister – Chief of Staff of the Government		Sergey Natarov	Liberal Democratic Party
Deputy Prime Minister for social affairs		Lyudmila Kozlova	Liberal Democratic Party
Deputy Prime Minister	Vacant		Communist Party
Deputy Prime Minister	Vacant		United Russia
Deputy Prime Minister	Vacant		A Just Russia
Minister of the Interior Affairs		Sergey Abeltsev	Liberal Democratic Party
Minister of Foreign Affairs		Leonid Slutsky	Liberal Democratic Party
Minister of Labour and Social Affairs		Yaroslav Nilov	Liberal Democratic Party
Minister of Tourism		Mikhail Degtyarev	Liberal Democratic Party
Minister of Agriculture		Pavel Grudinin	Independent

== Position ==
=== State structure ===
Vladimir Zhirinovsky is an ardent critic of the modern state structure of Russia.

In particular, Zhirinovsky criticized the Federal structure of Russia. In his opinion, Russia should be a unitary country that consists of 40 Governorates.

Zhirinovsky is a wrestler with foreign words in the Russian language, so he proposes to rename the office of President to the Supreme Ruler.

Zhirinovsky also proposes to reduce the number of members of the State Duma from 450 to 200 and to abolish the Federation Council.

=== Foreign policy ===
In foreign policy, Zhirinovsky intends to pursue an aggressive policy, but normalize relations with the West.

In particular, Zhirinovsky promises to return the Russian border as of 1985. According to him, it will happen through demanding referendums in former Soviet republics. At the same time, Zhirinovsky promises that will be able to normalize relations with the United States. He says he exchanged all options to America agreed that the Russian army will stand on the borders of the USSR as of January 1, 1985.

=== Other ===
Zhirinovsky has advocated for Volgograd to again be renamed Stalingrad, not because of his ideological position but out of respect for history.

== Trip ==
In January 2018 Vladimir Zhirinovsky scheduled visits to about 10 major cities. He planned to meet with voters, to visit industrial and agricultural enterprises and sports facilities. In addition, he planned to visit about 30 cities on campaign trains of the Liberal Democratic Party. According to Degtyarev, Zhirinovsky's trips were planned to involve his supporters from the stage, such as a Na Na band, Aleksey Goman, and Katya Lel.

== People ==
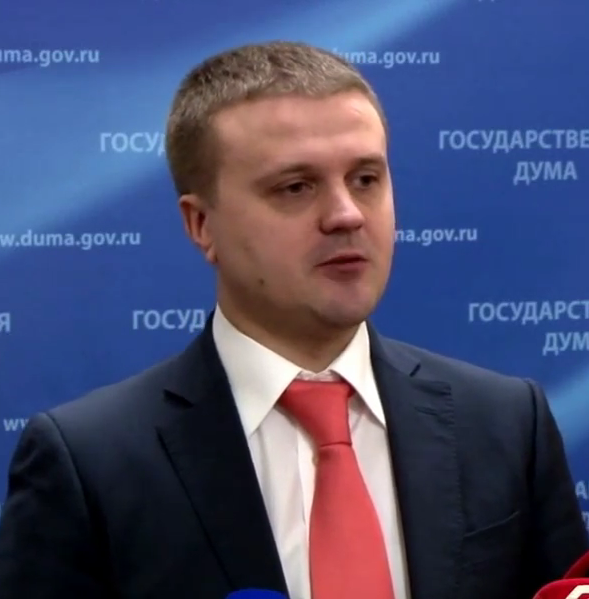
Alexei Didenko, campaign manager

A campaign manager was appointed the Deputy of the State Duma Alexei Didenko. Deputy campaign manager for the ideological part was Mikhail Degtyarev. Yaroslav Nilov is appointed the curator of special events and projects during the campaign. He will coordinate the work with large social groups, the believers, the disabled, motorists and pensioners.

== See also ==
- Vladimir Zhirinovsky 1991 presidential campaign
- Vladimir Zhirinovsky 1996 presidential campaign
- Vladimir Zhirinovsky 2000 presidential campaign
- Vladimir Zhirinovsky 2008 presidential campaign
- Vladimir Zhirinovsky 2012 presidential campaign
