= Vladimir Zhirinovsky 1991 presidential campaign =

Russian political campaign

- Campaign: 1991 Russian presidential election
- Candidate: Vladimir Zhirinovsky; Leader of the Liberal Democratic Party of the Soviet Union (1989-1992); Andrey Zavidiya
- Affiliation: Liberal Democratic Party of the Soviet Union
- Status: Nominated by LDPSU: April 12, 1991; Registered: May 22, 1991; Lost election: June 12, 1991
- Headquarters: Room 748, Hotel Moscow

The Vladimir Zhirinovsky 1991 presidential campaign was the election campaign of Liberal Democratic Party leader Vladimir Zhirinovsky in the 1991 Russian presidential election. Zhirinovsky ran on an ultranationalist platform. Widely unknown to most Russians at the start of the brief campaign period, Zhirinovsky ultimately managed a surprise third-place finish in the election.

== Campaigning ==
=== Initial campaign developments ===
On April 12 the Liberal Democratic Party of the Soviet Union, a party led by Zhirinovsky, became the second national party (after the Communist Party of the Soviet Union) to be officially registered by the Soviet Union (which had two weeks earlier revoked Article 6 of the Soviet Constitution, thus allowing for the registration of multiple parties). The following day, the party held its second congress and nominated Zhirinovsky to be its candidate in Russia's upcoming presidential election. After Boris Yeltsin, Zhirinovsky was the second individual to declare their candidacy for the presidency.

=== Registration ===
There were two ways for candidates to receive ballot registration, the first was through a signature drive and the second was through approval of 20% of the legislature. Zhirinovsky opted for the latter option, and thus did not turn in signatures by the deadline to register via signature drive.

A vote was held in the legislature on May 22 on whether or not to approve his candidacy. At this point, there were only twenty days left until the election. In the speech he delivered to the parliament, prior to their vote on whether to approve his candidacy, Zhirinovsky was rather restrained by his standards. The speech had populist undertones (he declared, "Whom do I represent? Not the people at the top, from the elite. And not from the bottom—prison guards, drunkards and homeless. No. Our common people are millions of Soviet citizens.") In the midst of his speech he switched from the Russian language to Turkey, in an effort to pander to Turkish-language deputies from Russia's Muslim republics. The speech was found to be theatrical, lively, and entertaining.

In the May 22 vote of the legislature Zhirinovsky received far more than the necessary number of votes (he received 477 votes, while he only needed 213 votes), thus attaining ballot registration. It was believed that part of reason why Zhirinovsky was able to garner enough endorsements was that the communists hoped he might be a spoiler, draining enough votes from Yeltsin to force a runoff.

For his vice-presidential running mate, Zhirinovsky chose Andrey Zavidiya, who had helped to provide Zhirinvosky funding for his campaign.

=== Final stretch ===
Once Zhirinovsky's candidacy was given ballot approval, there were only twenty days left before the election.

During this period Zhirinovsky travelled extensively, holding many rallies in cities across Russia. He orchestrated a vigorous campaign blitz which was far more intensive than the itineraries maintained by other candidates. For example, on a day in June Zhirinovsky's itenerary saw him (the day after having flown to Chelyabinsk and been driven directly from the airport to a television studio) start his morning by meeting with deputies of the Chelyablinsk Duma, then meet with students at the Thermal Technology Institute, they have a lunch break while at a tractor factory before speaking to the workers.

During his aforementioned visit to a Chelyabinsk tractor factory, the workers he spoke to were largely pro-Yelstin. He told them, "I have never been in power, I am not to be blamed for the disaster Russia now faces." The workers jeered him, shouting, "We're still going to vote for Yeltsin anyway." Seemingly acknowledging expectations to lose against Yeltsin, and revealing intentions to run again Zhirinovsky replied,

Go ahead and vote for him. You want to give him and others a chance. But they've already proven their helplessness and incompenency in governing you. In five years there will be new elections, and I'll come see you again. But they won't be coming to see you; they will have nothing to say to you.

Zhirinovsky had personally claimed to anticipate receiving between ten and twenty percent of the vote.

=== Result and aftermath ===
Zhirinovsky's campaign headquarters began celebrating on June 13, after state media had reported Zhirinovsky to have garnered a sizable vote share in the preliminary count. Zhirinivsky remarked to reporters, "my performance is consistent with my expectations."

Zhirinovsky placed third in the election. The strength of Zhirninovsky's performance surprised many.

In some areas of Russia, Zhirinovsky garnered as much as 20% of the vote.

Zhirinovsky's third-place finish positioned him as a serious political figure, particularly after Liberal Democratic Party's strong performance in the 1993 legislative election. Many expressed concerns about Zhirinovsky's new popularity. Leaders on both ends of the political spectrum viewed him as a populist with dictatorial aspirations. Some Soviet analysts went as far as comparing his rise to Adolf Hitler's early career.

Zhirinovsky ultimately used his third-place finish to bring the Liberal Democratic Party to prominence.

Additionally, on June 20, just eight days after losing the Russian presidential election, Zhirinovsky announced his candidacy for elections of USSR President, which were scheduled for March 1995.

==== Contesting the results ====
The day after the election, Zhirinovsky told Russian TV that he would have won the presidential election if he had been able to conduct his election campaign for three months rather than just twenty days. The same day, the Rab- ochaya tribuna reported that Zhirinovsky had filed a protest seeking to annul the votes received by Yeltsin, arguing that Yeltsin had used his official position as speaker of parliament to his advantage in the election. He pointed to actions such as Yeltsin telling members of the police force to vote for him and Yeltsin's use of state resources such as his use government printing presses for campaign material, RSFSR TV, and his use of state airplane for travel.

== Support ==
Zhirinovsky was, at first, regarded as little more clown by many in Russia, who did not take his candidacy seriously. He was seen merely as a cheap populist. He had only recently risen as a leader within the fringes of Russia's the far-right and was widely unknown to most voters. His Liberal Democratic Party was widely considered to be a fringe party and had been believed to have lacked strong support. His campaign also possessed very limited financial resources.

The 1991 presidential election served as Zhirinovsky's first major outing on the Russian political scene. He, by far, trailed the other candidates in name recognition.

Zhirinovsky initially faced prospective competition from Vladimir Voronin. Both Zhirinovsky and Vladimir Voronin had been leading figures within the Centrist Bloc, a coalition of groups that had been created in 1990 (with the alleged involvement of the KGB) and collapsed in April 1991 (after being hijacked by right-wing figures such as Zhirinovsky). On April 18 Voronin became the third individual to put themselves forward as a candidate or the presidency. However, Vorinin ultimately failed to become a registered candidate thus negating his potential impact on Zhirinovsky's performance.

The key advertising slogans that Zhirinovsky's campaign adopted were, “the last hope of a cheated and humiliated people" and “the very same as you”.

In his speeches, Zhirinovsky painted a dark picture of Russia's future under his opponents. He warned voters that he was the "only" candidate who could rescue Russia from the danger of a civil war. An ultranationalist candidate, Zhrinovsky played to the racial resentments which some ethnic Russians held against minorities. He was criticized for playing to the "base instincts" and "depravity" of voters by using appeals to sado-masochistic tendencies.

Zhirinovsky's performance in the election surprised analysts, largely, because they had not detected there to be a base of support for him. While other candidates seen to have clear social bases (Yeltsin was supported by those in favor of radical reforms, Rhyzhkov and Bakatin were supported by opponents of reform, Mashakov was supported by neo-Stalinists), none was observed for Zhirinovsky. This is, in part, because Zhirinovsky's support did not necessarily have a binding ideology. The largest segment of Zhirnovsky's voter support came from those who had been marginalized by social and political forces. Between 50 and 90 percent of voters who were serving as inmates in prison and labor camps voted for Zhirinovsky, significant since Russia had a prison population of nearly one million. Zhirinovsky also received a strong portion of the votes from policemen, special riot troops, those in KGB and Interior Ministry schools, and pensioners. Nearly half of his voters had either graduated or at least attended some college. Sociologist Igor Yakovenko had observed that many in a number of these groups were particularly concerned about potential unemployment or being forced to leave their profession due to socioeconomic changes. Yakovenko had observed that, "There are Zhirinovsky's in every country. But they are supported everywhere by only those segments of society that have nothing to lose...Zhirinovsky's popularity will grow in proportion to how bad the political and economic situation will get."

By his own admission, Zhirinovsky benefited as a candidate from the negative economic prospects many Russians were facing, saying, “If there were a healthy economy and security for the people, I would lose all the votes I have."

Zhirinvosky appealed to voters who desired to see order under an authoritarian leadership.

Zhirinovsky also benefited from the appeal of his energetic rhetorical flair and from having a well-financed and well-organized campaign.

In his promise of cheap and universal vodka, Zhirinovsky courted Russia's alcoholics, who had suffered financially from Gorbachev's anti-alcohol programs, which had led to alcohol prices skyrocketing.

== Platform ==
Zhirinovsky promised to, “bring Russia up off its knees". Zhirinovsky was an ultranationalist. He championed a return to a tsarist style of government.

He promised to reform the system of government, remove all limitations on economic activities, phase-out conscription in Russia's military, be tough in regards to law enforcement. Zhirinosky also prominently promised to lower prices on alcohol and to demand its sale in all commercial outlets. He summarized this campaign pledge by promising cheap vodka, "at every corner, around the clock if I win."

Zhirinovsky also vowed that he would adopt measures within the limits of the law in order to stop "anti-communist hysteria and witch-hunting".

Zhirinovsky promised to change Russia's foreign policy. He argued that the conflict between the East and the West had ended and that it was time for Russia to shift their focus to relations between the North and the South.

At a rally in Perm, Zhirinovsky promised not to remove the privileges provided to the military-industrial industry in the city due to the fact that the export of weapons was a strong source of revenue for the country.

== See also ==
- Vladimir Zhirinovsky 1996 presidential campaign
- Vladimir Zhirinovsky 2000 presidential campaign
- Vladimir Zhirinovsky 2008 presidential campaign
- Vladimir Zhirinovsky 2012 presidential campaign
- Vladimir Zhirinovsky 2018 presidential campaign
