= Vladimir Zhirinovsky 1996 presidential campaign =

- Campaign: 1996 Russian presidential election
- Candidate: Vladimir Zhirinovsky; Leader of the Liberal Democratic Party of Russia (1991–2022); Member of the State Duma (1993–2022); Leader of the Liberal Democratic Party of the Soviet Union (1991–92)
- Affiliation: Liberal Democratic Party of Russia
- Status: Nominee: 10 January 1996; Officially registered: 5 April 1996; Lost election: 16 June 1996

The Vladimir Zhirinovsky 1996 presidential campaign was the election campaign of Liberal Democratic Party leader Vladimir Zhirinovsky in the 1996 election.

== Campaigning ==
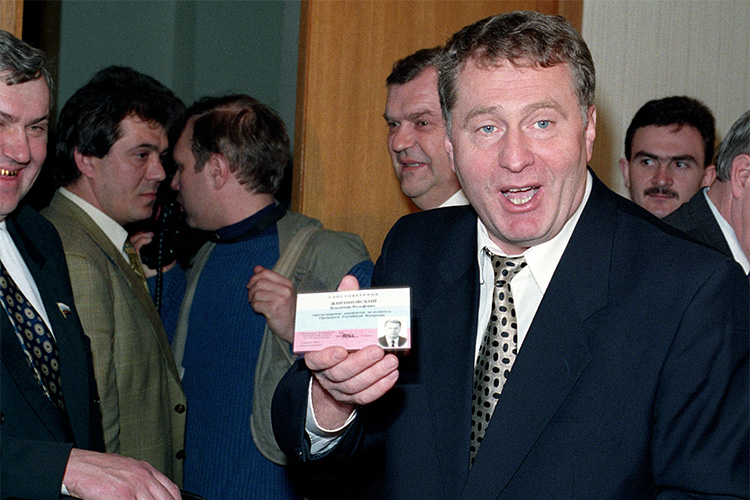
Zhirinovsky showing his presidential candidate's certificate, 5 April 1996

=== Early developments ===
==== Initial campaign for the Soviet presidency ====
Zhirinovsky's campaign unofficially began shortly after the conclusion of the 1991 RSFSR presidential election. After retreating for several days to the town of Sofrino, Zhirinovsky made an announcement on June 20, 1991 that he would run in the election of the President of the Soviet Union, which was slated to be held in March 1995 (with some talk of potentially scheduling an early election for the spring of 1992). Zhrinovsky insisted that an early election for Soviet president would need to be held in April 1992. "I must win the elections," Zhirinovsky warned a Moscovite journalist, "and I will win them. Otherwise it will mean civil war and dictatorship of the kind no scholar has ever described".

Zhirinovsky's initial campaigning largely consisted of (almost daily) rallies held across Moscow. He also travelled to locations such as collective farms on the outskirts of Moscow as well as cities such as Krasnodar, Leningrad, and Minsk. By November 1991 Zhirinovsky was seeking support from members of the military, offering promises to reward the army greatly in exchange for their support. However, Zhirinovsky's hope of being elected Soviet president quickly ended when the Soviet Union was officially dissolved in late December 1991.

==== Pivot to campaigning for the Russian presidency ====
After the fall of the Soviet Union, Zhirinovsky's ambitions turned back to the presidency of Russia, which was now the country's ultimate head-of-government.

Zhirinovsky continued campaigning as though elections were soon approaching, despite the fact the presidential elections were not scheduled to be held until 1996. His campaign for a non-pending election drew the curiosity of reporters, particularly the foreign press. Covering one of Zhirinovsky's campaign trips to remote areas of Russia, British journalist Peter Conradi wrote,

The Russian president has given no hint that he will not serve out his five-year term, but that does not dampen Zhirinovsky's electioneering. "Seventy or eighty percent of people will vote for me next time," he said recently. "Mr. Yeltsin is not ready. He's afraid of the Russian people. I am not afraid. I am ready for the next election.

Zhirinovsky began to obtain a greater profile as a challenger for the next presidential election. Ukrainian president Leonid Kravchuk once remarked with concern, "We must clearly understand that after the Russia of Yeltsin may come the Russia of Zhirinovsky."

As early as 1992 Zhirinovsky began to adopt more antisemitic rhetoric in a bid to steal supporters from far-right extremist groups such as Alexander Sterligov's Russian National Congress, Gennady Kyruchkov's Russian Republican Party, Alexander Barkashov's Russian National Unity, and REKS (a group whose name derived from the acronym for a Russian phrase meaning, "Slash the Jews like dogs"). This ultimately proved to be a successful effort, as Zhirinovsky stole much of these groups' support base by co-opting their bigotry.

As a means of furthering his political aspirations, Zhirinovsky decided that he would run in the election for Mayor of Moscow. He announced his candidacy for mayor in December 1992. He re-adapted his presidential campaign platform to serve as his mayoral campaign platform. His pledge was to "improve life quickly, to stamp out crime at last and to bring order to Moscow and then all of Russia." Zhirinovsky made it clear that he saw the mayor's office as a potential stepping-stone towards the presidency, declaring at a rally that he wanted to receive their support for mayor, "and, in the future, president of Russia." His mayoral bid was ultimately unsuccessful.

Soon after the end of the 1993 Russian constitutional crisis, Zhirinovsky declared at a rally that, "If a situation occurs in which a military government will be formed—as a result of a military coup—we, the LDP, will support it."

==== 1993 legislative elections ====
In the midst of the 1993 constitutional crisis, Yeltsin had disestablished the Congress of People's Deputies of Russia, and scheduled elections in December to form Russia's new legislative bodies. While the Federation Council election was to be nonpartisan, the State Duma election would be partisan.

Despite his third-place finish in the 1991 presidential election, experts had not expected for his Liberal Democratic Party to perform strongly in the legislative election. Polling conducted as late as a month before the election had shown his party with less than 2% support. At the tail end of the 1993 campaign, Zhirinovsky and his party saw an astonishing rise in support. Neither the liberal parties nor the communist parties were able to unite into solidified voting blocs. Democratic leaders had spent the election campaign fighting each other, rather than against opponents such as Zhirinovsky. Additionally, Zhirinovsky benefited from the fact that he had been actively campaigning (for president) for more than two years, and was able to quickly pivot his presidential campaigning towards legislative elections campaigning. Due to the fact that the 1993 legislative election was snap election, other parties had largely not been prepared to begin campaigning. Zhirinovsky also proved to have made effective use of television advertising. Additionally, the Russia's Choice bloc (which included Democratic Choice of Russia) made the mistake of deciding to run a minimal campaign.

Ultimately, Zhirnovsky's LDPR placed first in the 1993 State Duma elections, receiving 22.92% of the proportional representation vote and being tied with Democratic Choice of Russia as the two parties to win most seats (both won 64 seats). The Duma election utilized two different forms of apportionment. Half of the seats were apportioned through party-list proportional representation. LDPR had won 22.9% of the proportional representation vote (placing first), earning it 59 of those seats (more than any party). The other half of the Duma's seats were filled by the direct elections of candidates by voters in single-member districts. The LDPR had received only 3% of the single-member district vote (placing fifth among parties) and received only 5 seats in single-member districts.

==== Elevated political stature after the 1993 legislative elections ====
The strong performance of LDPR in the 1993 legislative election greatly bolstered Zhirinovsky's stature in Russian politics. It also raised strong concerns over Yeltsin's political future.

In April 1994, a time when many Russian newspapers were writing premature political obituaries for Yeltsin, Zhirinovsky continued to recognize Yeltsin as his strongest opponent writing,

He has won two coups, and he has outfoxed and beaten Gorbachev. What (a party) he has destroyed! He is simply a hero from a Russian fairy tale...Yeltsin goes about politics, not by Freidman's blueprints, but by intuition. There you cannot catch him with logic. Like me. Both of us are mystics. By the laws of logic I also couldn't have won the parliamentary elections and come in third in 1991. Therefore, among the candidates for the new presidency, Yeltsin is my most threatening rival. The rest of them are school-teachers and kids from the capital's elite schools.

While Zhirinovsky approved of many of Yeltsin's positions at this time (Yeltsin had co-opted aspects of Zhirinovsky's platform as part of a greater ploy to compete with Zhirinovsky's nationalist appeal) he ultimately felt that Yeltsin would be incapable of undertaking to two major steps that Zhirinovsky found necessary: restoring Russian control to the boundaries of the Soviet Union and dividing it into gubernii (turning the role of the president into that of a "father tsar"). Zhinovsky declared that the final push south would be "my chance, my mission".

During this time Zhirinovsky found himself the victim of acts of sabotage by Kremlin operatives. In the summer of 1994 both Zhirinvosky and Yeltsin separately embarked on Volga River cruises in order to meet face-to-face with members of the Russian electorate. The Kremlin worked to sabotage Zhirinovsky's journey. When the LDPR flew to North Korea to meet with the new Kim Jong-il regime, the Kremlin denied his plane approval for a requested layover in Kemerovo.

==== Decline in political stature ====
While Zhirinovsky had, following the 1993 legislative elections, been seen as likely to lead the opposition to Yeltsin in the next presidential election, he subsequently fell out of favor. Some argued that had Zhirinovsky maintained a moderate and diplomatic profile while dealing with the Western media, he might have received some degree of tolerance, perhaps even support, from the West. However, Zhirinovsky's statements and interviews were so inflammatory that they drove away all such potential support he might have received.

Following its performance in the 1993 legislative elections, Zhirinovsky's LDPR had the potential to be at the core of an organized opposition. Zhirinovsky struggled to sustain his party's electoral momentum after 1993, however. His violent antics in the Duma had the effect of disintegrating his party's credibility. Consequentially, Zhirinovsky's party declined in prominence. Ultimately, Zhirinovsky's faction split, by 1995, the LDPR found itself competing with the resurgent Communist Party for nationalist-leaning voters. Zhirinovsky's outlandish behavior had also largely removed him from serious consideration as a viable competitor for the presidency.

Even as he began to organize his campaign, the disarray of his political party continued. In the early months of 1996 Zhirinovsky's party lost several key members, including Viktor Kobalev, who had been the head of the party's successful campaign in the 1993 legislative election.

=== Official campaign ===
Zhirinvsky was nominated at the LDPR congress on January 10, 1996.

In February, at Zhirinovsky's behest, French nationalist politician Jean-Marie Le Pen traveled to Moscow to voice his support of Zhirinovsky's candidacy.

In February, Zhirinovsky lent his endorsement to Pat Buchanan, the Republican Party candidate for the United States presidential election. Buchanan sought to distance himself from the controversial Zhirinovsky. After Buchanan distanced himself from this endorsement, Zhirinovsky attacked him, writing an open letter which said, "You turned out to be just like Clinton and other corrupt politicians, moved by greed and vanity, not by love for the fatherland...Pat, you're a piece of crap. You dumped in your pants immediately after getting my congratulations."

Zhirinovsky officially filed his candidacy on April 6. Zhirinovsky was generally not considered to be a frontrunner, and was polling in the single-digits. His campaign was officially registered four days later.

In his first televised campaign advertisement, Zhirinovsky declared, "We don't need a collapsing and decaying Russia. We need a new Russia, a new course, a new policy".

In his campaign, Zhirinovsky portrayed himself as the only alternative to Boris Yeltsin and Gennady Zyuganov. Zhirinovsky was known to propagate an image centered around evoking a strong personality. Notorious for his flamboyance and outrageous stunts, on the campaign trail, Zhirinovsky delivered populist slogans accompanied by frequently by outrageous remarks. During his campaign, he was dismissed by some as an entertainer and a clown. Zhirnivosky's campaign team attempted to give Zhirinovsky a more serious, less buffoonish, reputation. However, these efforts were unsuccessful.

Zhirinovsky was famous for his inflammatory nationalist rhetoric, which had caused Western observers and moderates in Moscow to view Zhirinovsky as him as a dangerous and destabilizing influence in Russian politics. Zhirinovsky used divisive rhetoric and appealed to resentments towards ethnic minorities in order to build support amongst ethnic Russias, the largest nationality in the Russian Federation's populace. In his campaign, Zhirinovsky promoted the idea of a "great Russia" surrounded by imperialists and spies, essentially laying the blame for Russia's shortcomings on sabotage. He peppered these allegations with blatantly antisemitic undertones.

Zhirinovsky campaigned for the votes of prisoners. Zhirinovsky believed that he would be able to garner a strong enough support amongst incarcerated convicts to qualify him for the second round of the election. As a result, he visited prisons to campaign. When visiting prisons, Zhirinovsky went as far as promising to grant presidential amnesty to individual prisoners.

Zhirinovsky's began running out of resources early into the official election campaign. In many regions, Zhirinovsky's campaign lacked the financial resources to establish an effective campaign organization. Consequentially, Zhirinovsky was ultimately unable to field a competitive campaign in many areas. Among the locations where Zhirinovsky failed to install a competitive campaign operation was the city of Perm. Zhirinvosky's party had won the vote in Perm several months earlier, in the 1995 legislative election. However, despite making a last-minute campaign visit in the closing weeks before the election, Zhirinovsky lost the city, coming third behind both Yeltsin and Zyuganov.

=== Outcome ===
Zhirinovsky received an even lower share of the vote than he had been predicted to. As had been anticipated in the polls, he failed to perform high enough to qualify for the second round of the election. To political observers, Zhirinovsky's performance seemed to indicate that he was no longer a political firebrand. Russian voters appeared to view him more as an entertaining figure than a feasible political leader. Zhirinovsky had lost much of his share of the nationalist vote to Lebed, who had performed surprisingly strong in the election.

In some places Zhirinovsky managed to perform roughly as well as he had in his 1991 presidential campaign. For instance, in the Chelyabinsk Oblast Zhirinovsky received 5.23% of the vote, comparable to the 5.77% of the vote he had received there in 1991. However, even in Chelyabinsk, Zhirinovsky underperformed when compared to the LDPR's performance there during the 1993 and 1995 legislative elections (LDPR had garnered 20.58% of the Oblast's vote in 1993 and 10.06% in 1995).

== Positions ==
Zhirinovsky's positions trended towards the far-right of Russian politics. Zhirinovsky's positions were largely seen as fascist, however, Zhirinovsky himself sharply objected to such a characterization. In addition to being seen as a fascist, Zhirinovsky was also regarded to be an ultra-nationalist. Zhirinovsky's plans for reshaping the presidency essentially were to mold it into a dictatorship.

The LDPR defined its members as being individuals who do not separate their personal interests from those of the motherland, a "creator capable of carrying out the priority tasks of the motherland aimed at preserving peace and raising the standard of living of all the population of our vast country."

Zhirinovsky had, during the 1993 legislative campaign, referred to LDPR as the, “center-right party”, and claimed that its views were such that it could potentially be allied with Women of Russia and Civic Union in the State Duma.

Zhirinovsky had a flair for demagoguery. His written policy positions tended to be far more moderate than those he espoused in speeches and interviews.

== Media ==
=== Campaign videos and advertisements ===
Whilst other candidates took advantage of their allocated free airtime by airing taped montages or scripted remarks, the videos that Zhirinovsky provided for his free airtime often sounded like he was speaking extemporaneously, often improvising and ridiculing the advertisements of rival campaigns.

Among the television ads released by the campaign was an eleven-minute long campaign film with a dancing police officer, a tap-dancing professor and a singing pilot.

Zhirinovsky's campaign posters included ones declaring him to be "Russia's last hope".

== See also ==
- Vladimir Zhirinovsky 1991 presidential campaign
- Vladimir Zhirinovsky 2000 presidential campaign
- Vladimir Zhirinovsky 2008 presidential campaign
- Vladimir Zhirinovsky 2012 presidential campaign
- Vladimir Zhirinovsky 2018 presidential campaign
