= Vladimir Zhirinovsky 2012 presidential campaign =

Election campaign of the Liberal Democratic Party of Russia

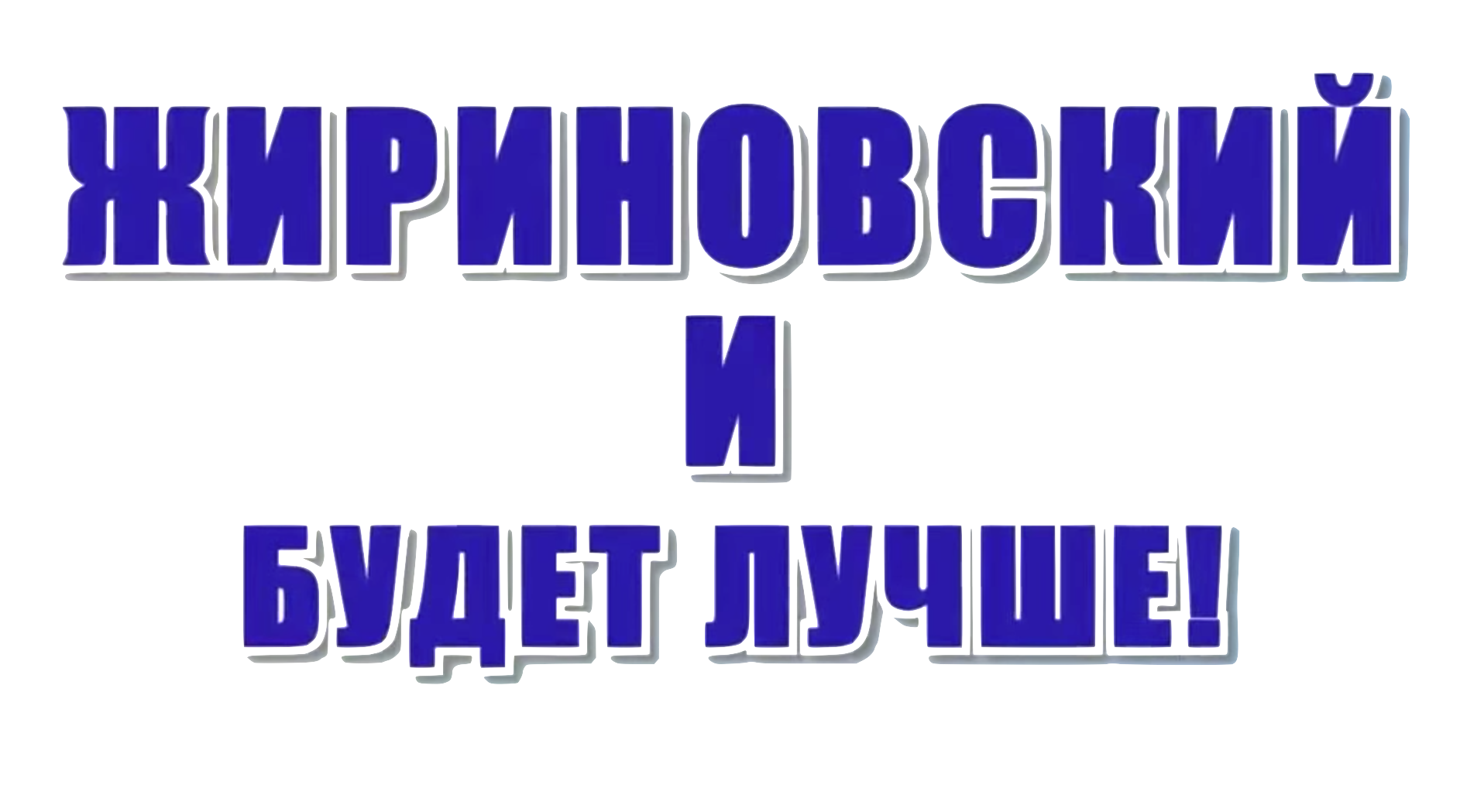
- Campaign: 2012 Russian presidential election
- Candidate: Vladimir Zhirinovsky; Leader of the Liberal Democratic Party of Russia (1991-present); Member of the State Duma (1993-present); Leader of the Liberal Democratic Party of the Soviet Union (1991-92)
- Affiliation: Liberal Democratic Party of Russia
- Slogan(s): "Vote Zhirinovsky, or things will get worse".

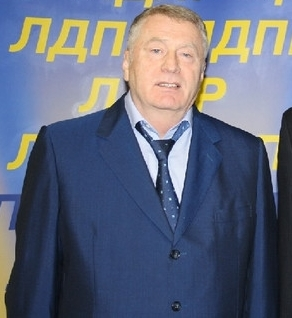
Zhirinovsky campaigning

The Vladimir Zhirinovsky 2012 presidential campaign was the election campaign of Liberal Democratic Party leader Vladimir Zhirinovsky in the 2012 Russian presidential election.

== Campaigning ==
On the last episode of debates with Prokhorov, just before the elections, Zhirinovsky caused a scandal by the Russian celebrities that supported Prokhorov, including a pop-diva and a veteran of Russian pop scene Alla Pugacheva, "prostitutes". Pugacheva had responded to those remarks by saying, "I thought you are an artful person, politician, cunning man, but you are just a clown and a psycho". Zhirinovsky retorted by declaring, "I am what I am. And such is my charm".

=== Donkey video ===
A 30-second video advertisement released by the campaign received significant attention, appearing on Youtube as "Zhirinovsky beats donkey!", Showing Zhirinovsky riding a donkey. Whooping the animal after it got stuck in the snow, the video gained attention also by animal organizations, accusing Zhirinovsky of cruelty to animals.

== Positions ==
=== Domestic ===
==== Cultural Preservation ====
Zhirinovsky opposed using foreign words, also stating that certain cities should restore their Soviet-era names.

==== Ethnic diversity ====
Zhirinovsky stated that: "Dark-skinned street vendors in Moscow make it look like a non-Russian city. This is a black stain that should be eradicated." Also stating for the "preservation of the white race".

==== Economic policy ====
Zhirinovsky stated that he will remove all limitations from all forms of economy and to influence such activity by taxation.

==== Family and Marriage ====
He advocated a two-child-tax and advocated banning Marriage of convenience.

== See also ==
- Vladimir Zhirinovsky 1991 presidential campaign
- Vladimir Zhirinovsky 1996 presidential campaign
- Vladimir Zhirinovsky 2000 presidential campaign
- Vladimir Zhirinovsky 2008 presidential campaign
- Vladimir Zhirinovsky 2018 presidential campaign
