= Vladimir Zhirinovsky 2008 presidential campaign =

Election campaign of the Liberal Democratic Party of Russia

- Campaign: 2008 Russian presidential election
- Candidate: Vladimir Zhirinovsky; Leader of the Liberal Democratic Party of Russia (1991-present); Member of the State Duma (1993-present); Leader of the Liberal Democratic Party of the Soviet Union (1991–92)
- Affiliation: Liberal Democratic Party of Russia

The Vladimir Zhirinovsky 2008 presidential campaign was the election campaign of Liberal Democratic Party leader Vladimir Zhirinovsky in the 2008 election. This was Zhirinovsky's fourth campaign for the Russian presidency, as he had previously run in the 1991, 1996, and 2000 elections.

== Campaigning ==
During the campaign Zhirinovsky released a video in which he fired a rifle at targets bearing the faces of his opponents.

Zhirinovsky generated controversy on the campaign trail by espousing severe and ludicrous proposals. For instance, he suggested that Russia should drop nuclear bombs into the Atlantic in order to create a tsunami that would flood Great Britain.

Rather than distancing himself from the scandal-ridden LDPR party member Andrey Lugovoy, who was wanted by Scotland Yard for murder, Zhirinovsky intentionally sought to be photographed beside him.

== Platform ==
Zhirinovsky took rather extreme positions on many issues. For instance, he proposed a locking down and closing all of Russia's borders immediately after the election. He declared, "If you think that these are the actions of a police state, well, be my guest. I promise that I will take these actions."

== See also ==
- Vladimir Zhirinovsky 1991 presidential campaign
- Vladimir Zhirinovsky 1996 presidential campaign
- Vladimir Zhirinovsky 2000 presidential campaign
- Vladimir Zhirinovsky 2012 presidential campaign
- Vladimir Zhirinovsky 2018 presidential campaign
