= Liberal Democratic Party of Transnistria =

Liberal Democratic Party of Transnistria Либерально-демократическая партия Республики Приднестровье
- Abbreviation: LDPP
- Leader: Valery Kulakli
- Founded: 1 August 2006
- Dissolved: 2016
- Headquarters: 25 October Street, Building 37A, Tiraspol, Transnistria, Moldova
- Ideology: Transnistrian nationalism Right-wing populism Russophilia
- Political position: Right-wing
- Regional affiliation: Liberal Democratic Party of Russia; Liberal Democratic Party of Belarus
- Slogan: "Freedom, Law, Order!"
- Seats in the Supreme Council: 0 / 33

The Liberal Democratic Party of Transnistria (Russian: Либерально-демократическая партия Республики Приднестровье, romanized: Liberalno-demokraticheskaya partiya Respubliki Pridnestrovye, ЛДПРП, LDPRP) is a nationalist and right-wing populist political party in the breakaway state of Transnistria, recognized as part of Moldova. It was formed on 1 August 2006 by followers of Vladimir Zhirinovsky and is affiliated with the Liberal Democratic Party of Russia. The party leader is Transnistrian politician Valerly Kulakli.

== History ==
The party already existed from before the fall of the Soviet Union as the Transnistrian branch of the Liberal Democratic Party of the Soviet Union and afterwards as the Transnistrian branch of the Liberal Democratic Party of Russia and was led by the Minister of Local Economy and Transport of Transnistria, Alexander Saydakov, who was assassinated in 1998.

On 1 August 2006, the regional branch of the LDPR separated from its mother party and became a separate entity, known as Liberal Democratic Party of Transnistria (LDPP). On August 2, a constituent congress was held in Tiraspol, where the party praised the Russian government for its support of Transnistria, while also stating that they "rely" on support from the LDPR and Vladimir Zhirinovsky. The congress formally elected Roman Khoudyakov, the LDPR Commissioner in Transnistria, as president, and was attended by sitting members of the Russian Duma and the Party of the Regions of Ukraine.

At the party's founding congress they outlined their platform as follows:

- "Prevent criminal and corrupted elements from penetrating into power bodies"
- "Liquidate lobbyism in favor of financial-political comprador and separatism-orientated groups in the power bodies"
- "Restore the artificially underscored servicemen’s status in the society"
- "Conclude military-political pacts with those states whose geopolitical interests coincide with the Transnistrian state’s interests"

Additionally, the party's motto was established as "Freedom, Law, Order!", and the resolution underlined that "[The LDPP] advocate[s] the restoration of the best traditions of the Russian empire and the Soviet Union." Shortly after their founding Congress the LDPP participated in protests calling for the annexation of Transnistria as a "second Kaliningrad."

Khudyakov would be expelled from the LDPR in 2016 and shortly after the LDPP's website would shut down and the party would become inactive.
