= Vladimir Zhirinovsky 2000 presidential campaign =

- Campaign: 2000 Russian presidential election
- Candidate: Vladimir Zhirinovsky; Leader of the Liberal Democratic Party of Russia (1991-2022); Member of the State Duma (1993-2022); Leader of the Liberal Democratic Party of the Soviet Union (1991-92)
- Affiliation: Liberal Democratic Party of Russia

The Vladimir Zhirinovsky presidential campaign, 2000 was the election campaign of Liberal Democratic Party leader Vladimir Zhirinovsky in the 2000 election.

== Background ==
In the lead up to the preceding 1999 Russian legislative election Zhirinovsky's Liberal Democratic party encountered issues regarding its registration. The party instead competed under the temporary name of the Zhirinovsky Bloc. The party outperformed the polls, capturing 6% of the vote. This demonstrated the party's ability to retain strong loyalty amongst its base of fervent supporters.

Zhirinovsky was not regarded to be a serious competitor in the 2000 presidential election. He was largely regarded to be a political "clown". Zhirinovsky nevertheless retained the support of dedicated followers, who were estimated to comprise between one and three percent of the Russian electorate. His appeal beyond that was hardly existent.

== Campaigning ==
As a candidate Zhirinovsky stirred up support through wild antics as well as by appealing to commoners, and by using nationalistic rhetoric.

Zhirinovsky had acquired a broad reputation for corruption by 2000.

Zhirinovsky's campaign demonstrated a coziness between him and Putin, having become a favorite "opposition" candidate of Putin's administration. He was seen as, arguably, the most pro-Putin opponent of Putin in the 2000 presidential election. He had become a loyal ally of Putin in the Duma. He avoided criticizing Putin. Zhirinovsky instead focused attacks on others, such as Grigory Yavlinsky, who he accused of having been "bought" by wealthy supporters.

== Platform ==
Zhirinovsky ran as a nationalist "law and order" candidate.

== See also ==
- Vladimir Zhirinovsky 1991 presidential campaign
- Vladimir Zhirinovsky 1996 presidential campaign
- Vladimir Zhirinovsky 2008 presidential campaign
- Vladimir Zhirinovsky 2012 presidential campaign
- Vladimir Zhirinovsky 2018 presidential campaign
