= Roman Khudyakov =

Russian politician (born 1977)

- Роман Худяков
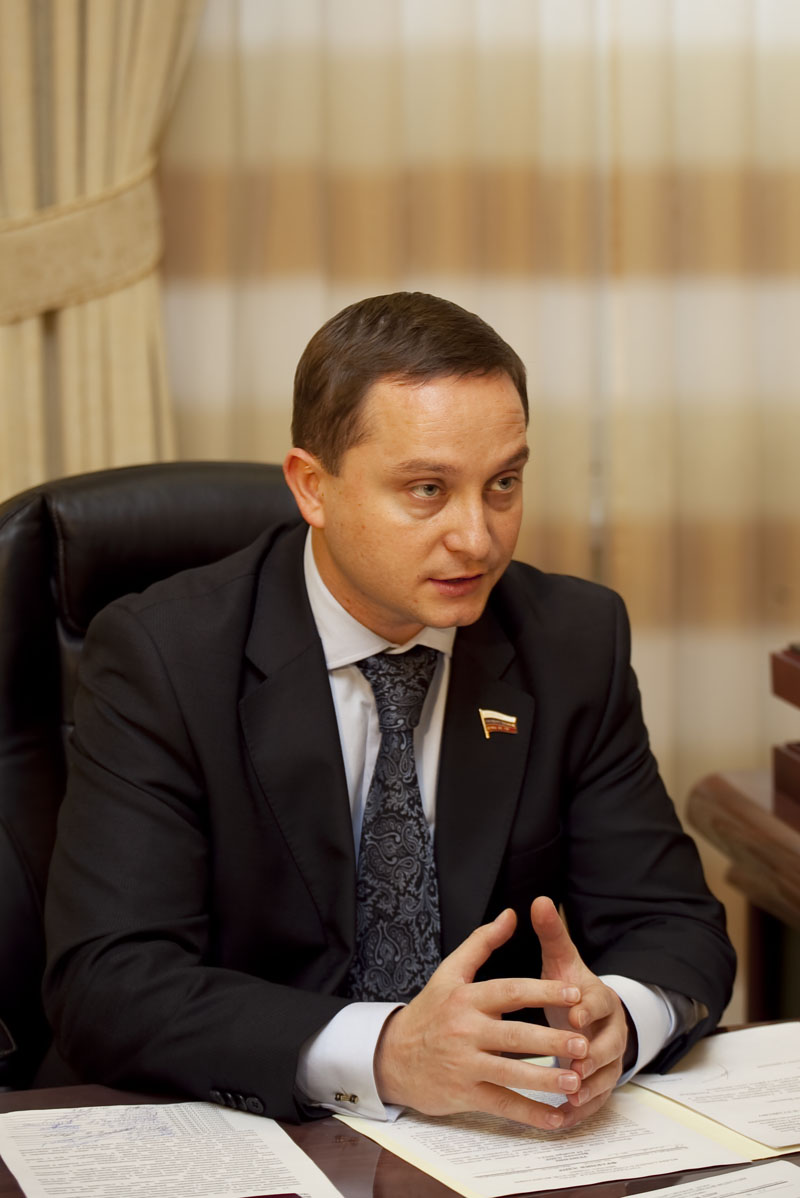
- Khudyakov in 2012

Member of the State Duma
- In office 2012–2016

Personal details
- Born: 28 January 1977 (age 49) Tiraspol, Moldovan SSR, Soviet Union
- Party: LDPR (until 2016); LDPP (until 2016)

Roman Ivanovich Khudyakov (Russian: Роман Иванович Худяков; born 28 January 1977) is a Transnistrian-born Russian politician. On 1 August 2006, he was elected chairman of the Liberal Democratic Party of Transnistria at the party's founding congress.

In 2011 he was a candidate to State Duma of Russia but lost the elections. On 16 May 2012 the Liberal Democratic Party of Russia decided to hand over to him a deputy mandate that became available after Aleksey Ostrovskiy received his position of Smolensk Oblast governor. In 2016 he was expelled from the Liberal Democratic Party of Russia and the Liberal Democratic Party of Transnistria. He later sought re-election with the Rodina party but lost to United Russia candidate Alexander Zhupikov.

== Gagauzia referendum ==
On 2 February 2014, Gagauzia held a referendum where an overwhelming majority of voters opted for closer ties with Russia over EU integration and also opted for the independence of Gagauzia if Moldova chooses to enter EU. Khudyakov attended the referendum as an observer.

== 2018 presidential campaign ==
On 21 December 2017, at the convention of the party Chestno (Honestly), Roman Khudyakov was nominated as a presidential candidate for the 2018 election. On the same day Khudyakov submitted documents to the CEC for official registration as a presidential candidate. Since Khudyakov was nominated by the non-parliamentary party, he had to collect 100,000 signatures in his support to register.

On 22 January 2018, Roman Khudyakov handed the collected signatures to the CEC, but immediately announced the withdrawal of his candidacy from the election and the support of the incumbent President Vladimir Putin.

== 2024 - Russo-Ukrainian war ==
Deputy of the State of Duma, 6th convocation. Recorded on the frontlines of the Russo-Ukrainian war.

== Controversy ==
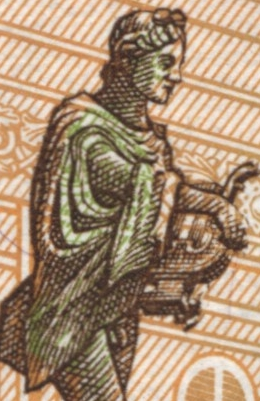
Offending image on 100-ruble banknote which exposes Apollo's nudity

On 8 July 2014 Khudyakov declared that the image of Apollo driving Quadriga on the portico of the Bolshoi Theatre in Moscow on the 100-ruble banknote constitutes as pornography because the image shows Apollo's genitals and should only be available to people older than 18 years of age. Since it is impractical to limit the access of minors to banknotes, he requested in his letter to the Governor of the Bank of Russia Elvira Nabiullina to urgently change the design of the banknote. He was ignored and, as of 2020, recently printed 100-ruble notes sport the same image.

== Awards and achievements ==
- 2007 — Medal "For Excellence in Labor"
- 2007 — Cross "For Mercy, Honor, and Integrity"
- 2010 — Jubilee Medal "20 Years of the Pridnestrovian Moldavian Republic"
- 2012 — Jubilee Medal "75 Years of Tambov Oblast"
- 2012 — Medal of Saint George the Victorious for services to the Moldovan Orthodox Church
- 2014 — Certificate of Appreciation from the Tambov Regional Duma for active participation in improving the legislative framework of Tambov Oblast
- 2014 — Letter of Appreciation from the Chairman of the State Duma of the Russian Federation for personal contribution to the development of Russian legislation
- 2014 — Medal "For the Return of Crimea"
- 2015 — Medal "70 Years of Victory in the Great Patriotic War of 1941–1945"
