= Sergey Abeltsev =

Russian politician

- Сергей Абельцев
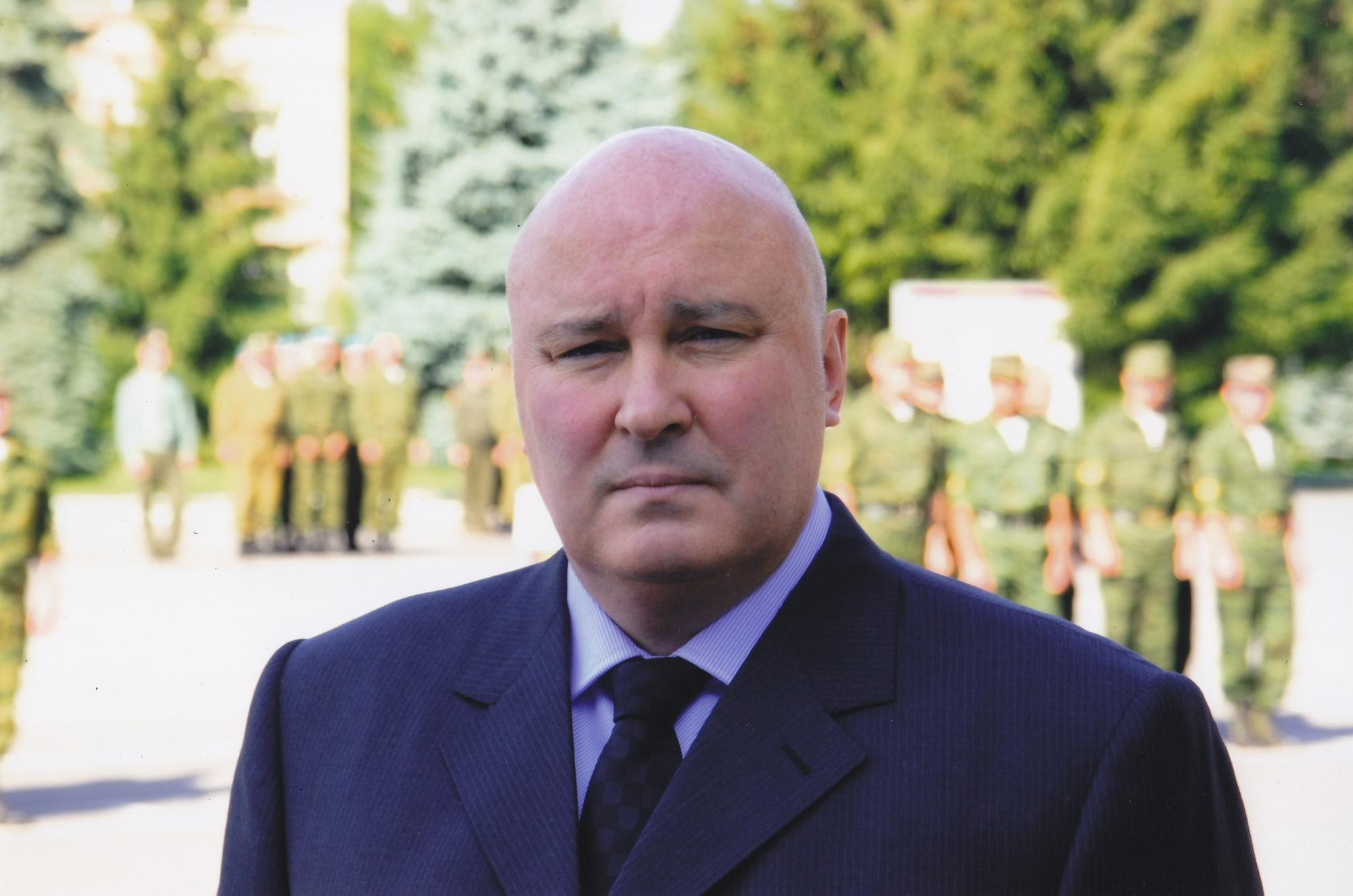

Personal details
- Born: Sergey Nikolayevich Abeltsev; 6 May 1961 (age 65) Lyubertsy, RSFSR, USSR

Sergey Nikolayevich Abeltsev (Russian: Серге́й Николаевич Абельцев; born 6 May 1961 in Lyubertsy, Russian SFSR) was a member of the State Duma of Russia and a former bodyguard of Vladimir Zhirinovsky. He has been a member of the State Duma's Committee on National Security since December 2003 and a member of the Liberal Democratic Party of Russia. Prior to his election to the State Duma, Abeltsev was a member of the LDPR Supreme Council. He has degrees in management, law, and military science.

== Career ==
In 1991 he became an assistant to LDPR Chairman Vladimir Zhirinovsky. Since December 1992 he has been a member of the Supreme Council, deputy chairman of the party.

In 1993 he was elected to the 1st State Duma. In 1995 he was re-elected to the 2nd State Duma.

In 2001 he graduated from the Law Institute of the Ministry of Internal Affairs of Russia.

In 2007 he was re-elected to the 5th State Duma.

In 2000 and 2018 he was a confidant of LDPR presidential candidate Vladimir Zhirinovsky. In 2021 he ran for the State Duma again, but was excluded from the LDPR list by decision of the supreme council of the party. From April 2022 to November 2023 he served as assistant to the first deputy head of the LDPR faction in the State Duma.

== Controversial activities ==
He said: "Renaissance came to Europe only after the Inquisition. We must learn from the lessons of History".

Abeltsev has publicly proposed that Yevgeny Adamov, former Russian atomic energy minister, should be assassinated to prevent him from disclosing state secrets in Switzerland. In June 2009, Abeltsev, in an interview with the Georgian television channel Rustavi 2, advised the U.S. Assistant Secretary of State Philip H. Gordon to change his family name to a more resonant one — Condom and to give up politics and run a sex shop at the White House. He later claimed he had been provoked by the Georgian journalists, but refused to withdraw his remarks regarding Gordon.

Academic Degrees

In 1997, he defended his candidate of legal sciences dissertation on the topic: “Greed and Violence in Serious Crimes Against the Person”.

In 2001, he earned a doctoral degree in legal sciences with a dissertation titled: “Criminological Study of Violence and the Protection of the Individual from Violent Crimes”.

According to an analysis by Dissernet, Abel’tsev’s doctoral dissertation (supervised by G. A. Avanesov) contains extensive undocumented borrowings from three other dissertations, as well as from his own earlier candidate dissertation. Furthermore, Abel’tsev’s dissertation later served as an undocumented “foundation” for the candidate dissertation of then–Deputy Secretary of the Security Council of Russia, Vladimir Vasilyev (also supervised by Avanesov).

== Arrest on Suspicion of Fraud ==
On July 18, 2024, law enforcement authorities detained Sergey Abel’tsev. The Zamoskvoretsky District Court placed him under arrest in a criminal case concerning large-scale fraud (Part 4, Article 159 of the Criminal Code of the Russian Federation). According to Kommersant, Abel’tsev is suspected of embezzling 10 million rubles. Investigators believe that Abel’tsev, by providing false information about his alleged connections with high-ranking officials of the State Duma, promised to secure a position as a deputy assistant in exchange for a monetary reward.
