= Igor Lebedev (politician) =

Russian politician

- Игорь Лебедев
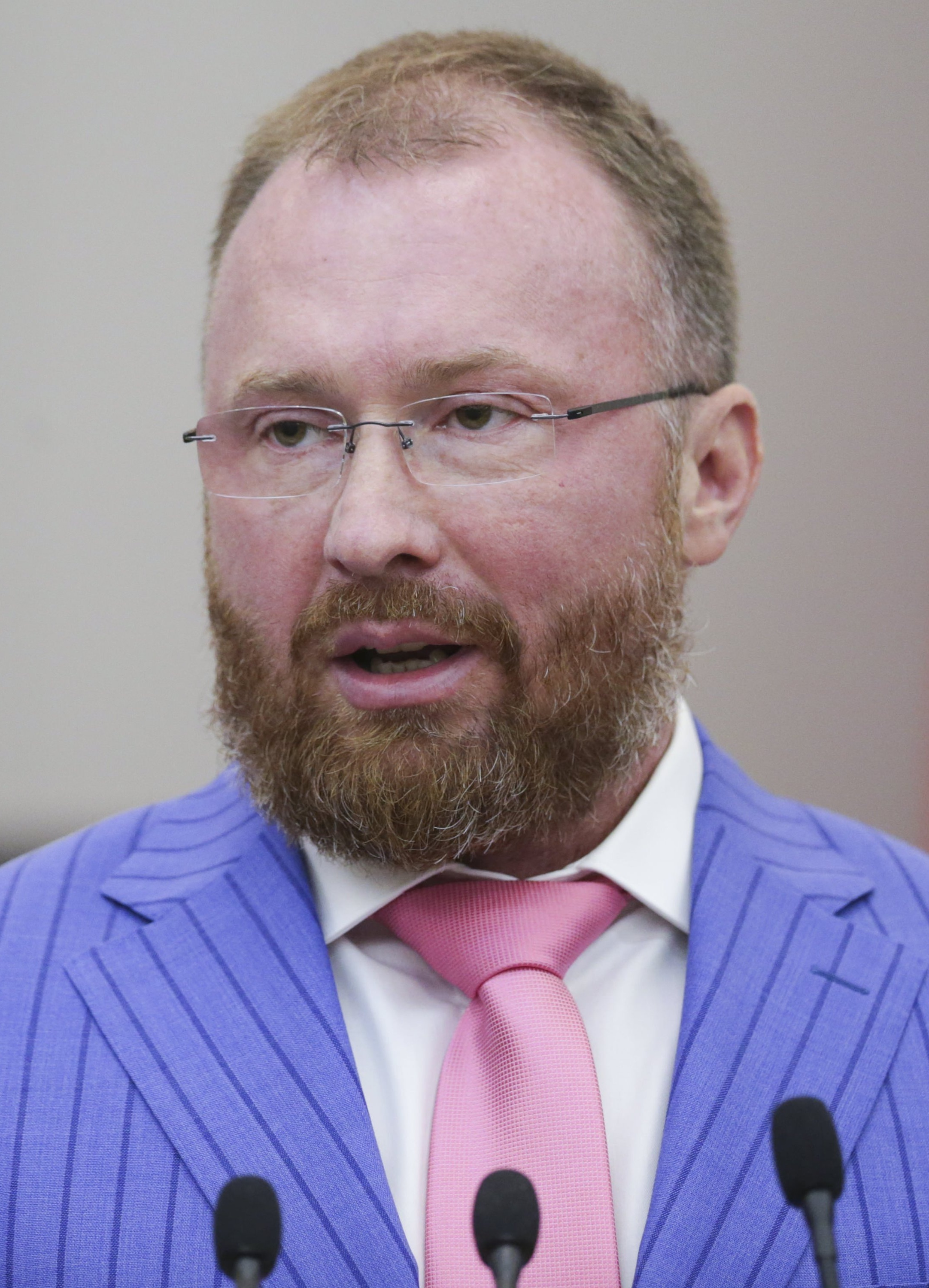
- Lebedev in 2019

Member of the State Duma
- In office 19 December 1999 – 12 October 2021

Deputy Chairman of the State Duma
- In office 21 December 2011 – 12 October 2021

Personal details
- Born: Igor Vladimirovich Zhirinovsky; 27 September 1972 (age 54) Moscow, Russian SFSR, Soviet Union
- Party: Liberal Democratic Party of Russia
- Spouse: Lyudmila Lebedeva
- Children: 3
- Parent: Vladimir Zhirinovsky (father)
- Education: Moscow Academy of Law (1996)
- Occupation: Politician

Igor Vladimirovich Lebedev (né Zhirinovsky; Russian: Игорь Владимирович Лебедев né Жириновский; born 27 September 1972) is a Russian politician. He is a former deputy of the State Duma, a Deputy Chairman of the Duma, and chairman of the populist Liberal Democratic Party of Russia's Duma parliamentary group, and of the Liberal Democratic Party of Russia's Youth Organization. He was a member of the State Duma's Committees on Budget Issues and Taxes, and State Building and Legislation. His father was Vladimir Zhirinovsky, chairman of the Liberal Democratic Party of Russia.

As of 12 September 2014, Lebedev was sanctioned by the European Union and the United Kingdom for voting in favor of the annexation of Crimea by the Russian Federation.

== Controversy ==
Following supporter violence involving Russian fans at the Euro 2016 tournament, Lebedev tweeted "nothing wrong with fans fighting" and to "keep up the good work".

In March 2017, Lebedev proposed legalising football hooliganism and turning it into a sport.

In 2020, during the spring session, deputy Lebedev missed 95.35 percent of the State Duma votes, ranking first among absentees.

== Family ==
He is married to Lyudmila Nikolaevna Lebedeva (born 1975) and has twin sons, Alexander and Sergey (born 1998), who are studying in Switzerland.

On April 3, 2018, a third son was born.

According to the Baza publication, from August 2016 to March 2019, Igor Lebedev was married to former basketball player Maria Grishina, with whom he has a son and a daughter. They also reported his name legally being changed to Igor Garcia.
