= Vladimir Zhirinovsky =

Russian politician (1946–2022)

- Владимир Жириновский
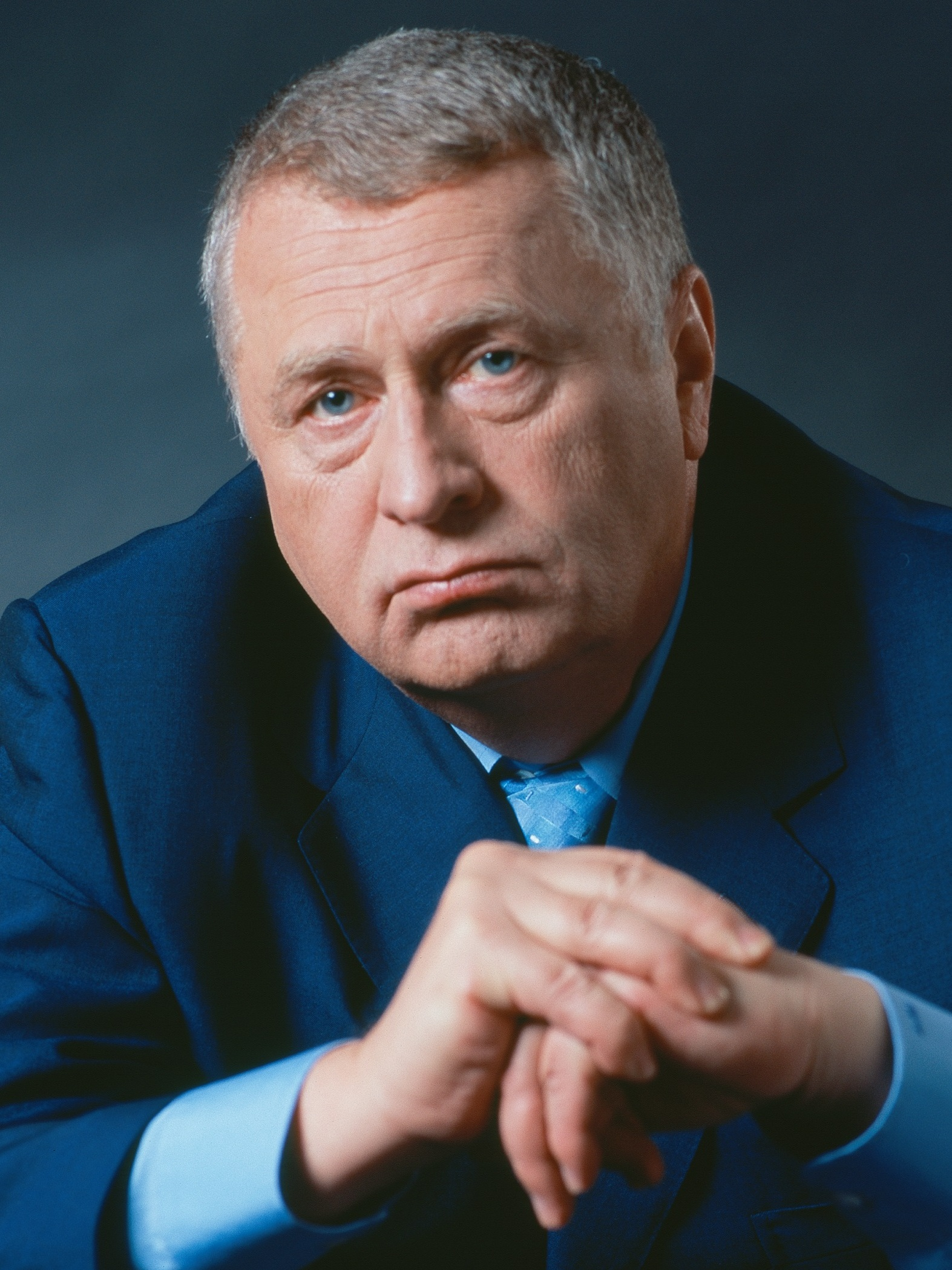
- Portrait, 2006

Leader of the Liberal Democratic Party of Russia
- In office 18 April 1992 – 6 April 2022
- Succeeded by: Alexei Didenko (acting); Leonid Slutsky

Parliamentary leader of the LDPR in the State Duma
- In office 21 December 2011 – 6 April 2022
- Preceded by: Igor Lebedev
- Succeeded by: Leonid Slutsky (acting)
- In office 12 December 1993 – 18 January 2000
- Succeeded by: Igor Lebedev

Vice Chairman of the State Duma
- In office 18 January 2000 – 21 December 2011
- Chairman: Gennady Seleznyov; Boris Gryzlov
- Preceded by: Mikhail Gutseriyev
- Succeeded by: Igor Lebedev

Member of the State Duma (Party List Seat)
- In office 17 December 1995 – 6 April 2022
- Succeeded by: Andrey Svintsov

Member of the State Duma for Moscow Oblast
- In office 11 January 1994 – 17 January 1996
- Preceded by: constituency established
- Succeeded by: constituency abolished
- Constituency: Shchyolkovo (No. 114)

Leader of the Liberal Democratic Party of the Soviet Union
- In office 13 December 1989 – 18 April 1992

Personal details
- Born: Vladimir Volfovich Eidelshtein; 25 April 1946 Alma-Ata, Kazakh SSR, Soviet Union
- Died: 6 April 2022 (aged 75) Moscow, Russia
- Resting place: Novodevichy Cemetery
- Party: Liberal Democratic Party of Russia
- Spouse: Galina Lebedeva (m. 1971)
- Children: 3, including Igor Lebedev
- Education: Moscow State University (DPhil)
- Occupation: Lawyer; politician; philologist
- Awards: Order "For Merit to the Fatherland" (2nd, 3rd, 4th class); Order of Alexander Nevsky (2015); Order of Honour (2008)
- Religion: Russian Orthodox

Military service
- Allegiance: Soviet Union
- Branch: Soviet Army
- Service years: 1970–1972
- Rank: Colonel
- Vladimir Zhirinovsky's voice recorded 27 May 2013

Vladimir Volfovich Zhirinovsky (Russian: Владимир Вольфович Жириновский, IPA: [vlɐˈdʲimʲɪr ˈvolʲfəvʲɪtɕ ʐɨrʲɪˈnofskʲɪj], né Eidelstein, Russian: Эйдельштейн; 25 April 1946 – 6 April 2022) was a Russian right-wing populist politician who served as the leader of the Liberal Democratic Party of Russia (LDPR) from its creation in 1992 until his death in 2022.

Zhirinovsky served as a deputy chairman of the State Duma from 1993 to 2000 and from 2011 until 2022. He also worked as a delegate in the Parliamentary Assembly of the Council of Europe from 1996 to 2008. During his lifetime, Zhirinovsky ran in every single Russian presidential election except for the 2004 election.

Zhirinovsky was known for many controversies, as well as staunch advocacy for Russian military action against NATO.

== Early life and background ==
Vladimir Volfovich Zhirinovsky was born in Alma-Ata, the capital of the Kazakh SSR (modern-day Almaty, Kazakhstan). His father, Volf Isaakovich Eidelshtein, was a Ukrainian Jew from Kostopil in western Ukraine, and his mother, Alexandra Pavlovna (née Makarova), was an ethnic Russian from Mordovia. Zhirinovsky inherited his surname through Andrei Vasilievich Zhirinovsky, Alexandra's first husband. His paternal grandfather was a wealthy industrialist in Kostopil, who owned the largest sawmill in modern Ukraine and was head of the local Jewish community. His grandfather's mill has an income of $32 million a year as of 2015, and over the years Zhirinovsky demanded that successive Ukrainian governments return it to him.

In July 1964, Zhirinovsky moved from Almaty to Moscow, where he began his studies in the Department of Turkish Studies, Institute of Asian and African Countries at Moscow State University (MSU), from which he graduated in 1969. Additionally, he studied law and international relations at the Institute of Marxism-Leninism. Zhirinovsky entered military service in Tbilisi during the early 1970s and worked at posts in state committees and unions. He was awarded a Dr.Sci. in philosophy by MSU in 1998.

Although he participated in some reformist groups, Zhirinovsky was not well known in Soviet political developments during the 1980s. While he contemplated a role in politics, a nomination attempt for a seat as a People's Deputy in 1989 was quickly abandoned. In 1989, he served as a director of Shalom, a Jewish cultural organization; unknown in Jewish circles before, he is thought to have been invited to join by the Anti-Zionist Committee of the Soviet Public, but subsequently forcefully opposed its influence in the group.

=== Jewish heritage ===
Four of Zhirinovsky's relatives were murdered during the Holocaust. Zhirinovsky's parents separated while he was still an infant. Abandoning the family, Zhirinovsky's father, Volf Eidelshtein, emigrated to Israel in 1949 (together with his new wife Bella and his brother), where he worked as an agronomist in Tel Aviv. Zhirinovsky's father was a member of the right-wing nationalist Herut party in Israel, and died in 1983 when he was run over by a bus near Dizengoff Street in Tel Aviv.

Zhirinovsky did not find out the details of his father's life in Israel, or even the fact that he had died until many years later. Zhirinovsky said that he was an Orthodox Christian. In 1994, Zhirinovsky was presented with a birth certificate indicating his original name as Eidelshtein; he claimed that the document was faked.

Zhirinovsky denied his father's Jewish origins until Ivan Close Your Soul, published in July 2001, in which he described how his father, Volf Isaakovich Eidelshtein, changed his surname from Eidelshtein to Zhirinovsky. He then wrote, "Why should I reject Russian blood, Russian culture, Russian land, and fall in love with the Jewish people only because of that single drop of blood that my father left in my mother's body?"

According to Zhirinovsky, "[His] mother was Russian and [His] father was a lawyer". Zhirinovsky later retracted the statement after researching his father's life in Israel. Discussing the statement, Zhirinovsky says: "Journalists mocked me: for saying I was the son of a lawyer. And I am really the son of an agronomist."

Discussing his father, Zhirinovsky said with tears in his eyes, "All my life I was looking for him. I believed that he was alive. I believed that someday he would find me... But there is a silver lining. I tried to imitate him... And I was able to achieve a certain position in life even without the support of my father."

== Founding of the Liberal Democratic Party and 1991 presidential campaign ==
In April 1991, Zhirinovsky, along with Vladimir Bogachev, took initiatives which led to the founding of the Liberal Democratic Party of the Soviet Union, which was the second registered party in the Soviet Union in 1990 and therefore the first officially sanctioned opposition party. According to the former CPSU Politburo member Alexander Nikolaevich Yakovlev, the party started as a joint project of the Communist Party of the Soviet Union (CPSU) leadership and the KGB.

Yakovlev wrote in his memoirs that KGB director Vladimir Kryuchkov presented the project of the puppet LDPSU party at a meeting with Mikhail Gorbachev and informed him about the selection of the LDPR leader. According to Yakovlev, the name of the party was chosen by KGB General Philipp Bobkov. Bobkov, however, stated that he was against the creation of "Zubatov's pseudo-party under KGB control that would direct the interests and sentiments of certain social groups".

Zhirinovsky's first political breakthrough came in June 1991, when he came third in Russia's first presidential election, gathering more than six million votes (7.81% of the vote). Zhirinovsky's populist platform included promises to voters that if he elected, free vodka would be distributed to all. Similarly, he once remarked that if he were made president, underwear would be freely available during a political rally inside a Moscow department store.

== 1990s political career ==
Following the dissolution of the Soviet Union, the party was renamed as the Liberal Democratic Party of Russia. In 1992, Zhirinovsky made contact with Jean-Marie Le Pen, the then-leader of France's Front National (FN). Eduard Limonov of the National-Bolshevik Party introduced the two men to each other and the FN later "provided logistical support [to the LDPR], including computers and fax machines". Zhirinovsky suggested establishing the International Centre of Right-wing Parties in Moscow and invited Le Pen to visit Moscow.

The Liberal Democratic Party was a significant force in Russian politics, particularly in the early 1990s. At the height of its success, the LDPR gathered 23% of the vote in the 1993 Duma elections and achieved a broad representation throughout Russia – it gained the most votes in 64 out of 87 regions. It encouraged Zhirinovsky to once again run for president, this time against incumbent Boris Yeltsin. Yeltsin's candidacy seemed seriously challenged by Russian nationalist groups and a rejuvenated Communist Party alarmed many outside observers, particularly in the Western world, who expressed concern that such developments posed a serious threat to the survival of Russian democracy, which was already in a very fragile state. During the 1990s, commentators described Zhirinovsky as fascist, having fascist tendencies, and a neo-fascist.

During a visit to France in 1994, he said: "It's all over for you once you're Americanized and Zionized", and threw stones and dirt at Jewish protesters. Michael Specter, in a piece for The New York Times published in the same year, said Zhirinovsky's "party is not liberal, not democratic, and these days not much of a party". A 1995 BBC documentary showed Zhirinovsky telling the crowd at a campaign rally: "Help us, and you'll never have to vote again! I'm not saying, 'Vote for us and maybe in 20 years' time somebody will do something.' No, these will be the last elections! The last ones!"

The LDPR was less successful in the December 1995 legislative election.

While some observers believed that Zhirinovsky's controversial statements were efforts to drum up nationalist support as an electoral fodder meant for domestic consumption, there was considerable dismay when in February 1996 (months before a presidential election), Zhirinovsky placed second in opinion polls, behind the Communist Party's Gennady Zyuganov and ahead of Yeltsin. In the election, Zhirinovsky placed fifth, with a 5.7% share in the first voting round.

In the 1999 legislative election, his party (running as the "Zhirinovsky Bloc") fared worse than it had in the previous election.

== Putin-era political career ==
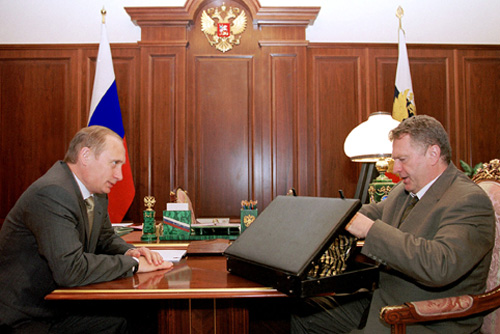
Zhirinovsky and Vladimir Putin at the Kremlin in 2000

Zhirinovsky campaigned in the 2000 presidential election. His party's fortunes stabilised, and in the 2003 legislative election, LDPR had a vote share of 11.7%, which was nearly double of its vote share in the 1999 election.

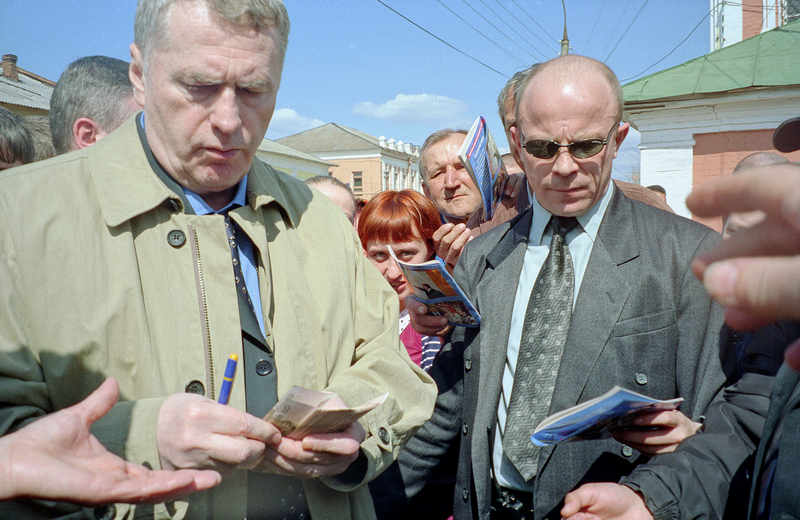
Zhirinovsky in 2004 handing out money to random passers-by.

In 2004, Zhirinovsky declined to be nominated by LDPR, leaving that role to Oleg Malyshkin, who received 2% support from voters.

Zhirinovsky campaigned in the 2008 presidential election, promising a "police state" with summary executions.

Zhirinovsky campaigned again in the 2012 presidential election. On 6 February 2012, Zhirinovsky released a 30-second election video on the Internet that featured him on a sleigh harnessed to a black donkey representing the country. The video received mostly negative reactions from Russian users. Organizations including People for the Ethical Treatment of Animals (PETA) and the World Society for the Protection of Animals (now known as World Animal Protection), as well as Russian animal rights activists, accused Zhirinovsky of cruelty to animals. He responded by saying that similar treatment is common in the Arab world and that the donkey had been treated "better than many people".

On 12 September 2014, Zhirinovsky was sanctioned by the UK government in relation to actively supporting the use of Russian Armed Forces in Ukraine and annexation of Crimea.

Zhirinovsky campaigned for president for a final time in the 2018 presidential election.

== Views ==
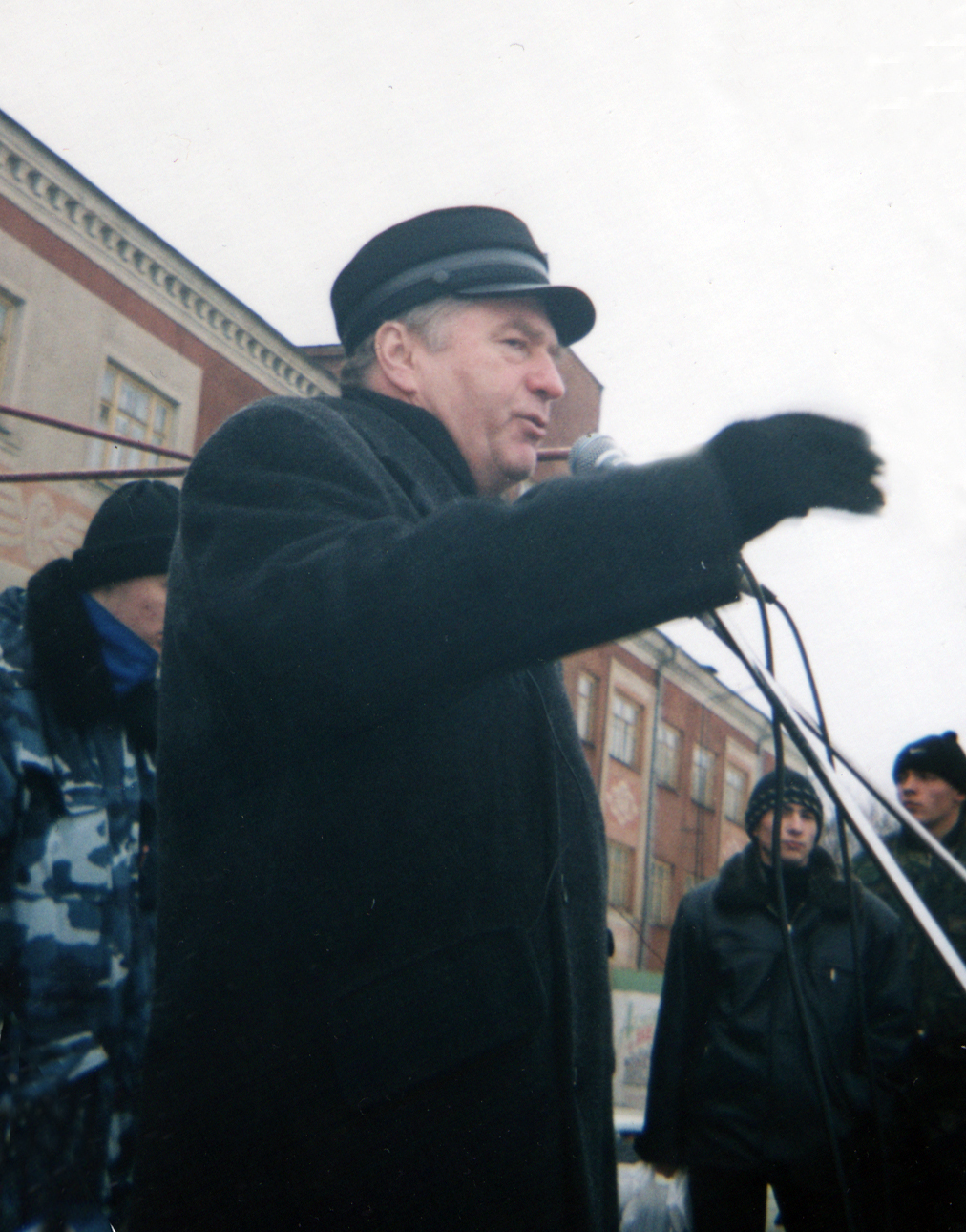
Zhirinovsky speaking at a pre-election rally in 1999

Zhirinovsky expressed admiration for the 1996 United States presidential election candidate Pat Buchanan, referring positively to Buchanan's comment labelling the United States Congress as "Israeli-occupied territory". Zhirinovsky said that both the United States and the Russian Federation were "under occupation" and that "to survive, we could set aside places on U.S. and Russian territories to deport this small but troublesome tribe."

Buchanan strongly rejected this endorsement, saying that he would provide safe haven to persecuted minorities if Zhirinovsky were ever elected Russia's president, which elicited a harsh response by Zhirinovsky: "You soiled your pants as soon as you got my congratulations. Who are you afraid of, Zionists?"

Scholars of Russia consider him to have a neo-Eurasianist outlook. In addition to expressing his concern for Turks and Caucasians displacing the Russian population from their settled territory, Zhirinovsky also advocated for all Chinese and Japanese people to be deported from the Russian Far East. During his 1992 visit to the United States, Zhirinovsky called for "the preservation of the white race" on television and warned that the white Americans were in danger of turning their country over to Black and Hispanic people.

In 2004, Zhirinovsky spoke at the City Court of Saint Petersburg, in reference to the assassination of Galina Starovoytova. After accusing Starovoytova of having worked for foreign intelligence, he said: "I have always said openly that for democrats of pro-Western orientation there are only three roads: prison, the grave, and emigration."

On 23 August 2014, Zhirinovsky said Russia should abolish political parties, instead favouring an autocratic system in which the leader would be chosen by the "five to six thousand wisest people" in the country. He also proposed returning to the Imperial flag and anthem. The proposals were rejected by Vladimir Putin.

In September 2016, inspired by Donald Trump's signature border wall proposal, Zhirinovsky proposed building a border wall and banning Muslims from entering Russia.

=== The Last Break Southward ===
In The Last Break Southward (1995), Zhirinovsky described his worldview, which is as follows: "Since the 1980s, I have elaborated a geopolitical conception—the last break southward, Russia's reach to the shores of the Indian Ocean and the Mediterranean." This is "really the solution for the salvation of the Russian nation ... It solves all problems and we gain tranquility." Russia would rule the space "from Kabul to Istanbul," and the United States would feel safer with the Russian rule in the region because wars would cease. Perhaps some people in Kabul, Teheran, or Ankara would not like it, but many people would feel better. "The Persians and Turks would suffer a bit but all the rest would gain."

The "bells of the Orthodox Church must bell from the Mediterranean to the Indian Ocean," and Jerusalem becomes close. It is necessary that "the Christian world reunifies in Jerusalem," and the Palestinian problem can be solved by partial transfer of the Palestinian population to the former territories of Turkey and Iran. The great Russian language and Russian ruble would wield Near Eastern and Central Asian peoples into one Russian citizenship.

Along the Russia southern sphere from India to Bosporus, other spheres of influence will stretch from north to south in the forthcoming world order, Latin America would be in the American sphere, Africa in the European sphere. and Japan and China will rule Southeast Asia, Indonesia, and Australia. Everywhere "the direction is the same—north-south." Geopolitically, he saw his position as logical: "Hence, the distribution along such a geopolitical formula would be very beneficent for the whole of humanity, and all over the planet would be established warm and clear political climate."

"On this occasion, we need a man with at least planetary thinking," who would realise "the geopolitical formula, guaranteeing the interests of the majority on the planet ... This is the fate of Russia. It is destination, fate ... We must do it, for we have no choice ... This is geopolitics." We would do it, assured Zhirinovsky alluding to himself, by the efforts of an "honest, perseverant, patriotically inspired President."

=== Foreign relations and military excursions ===
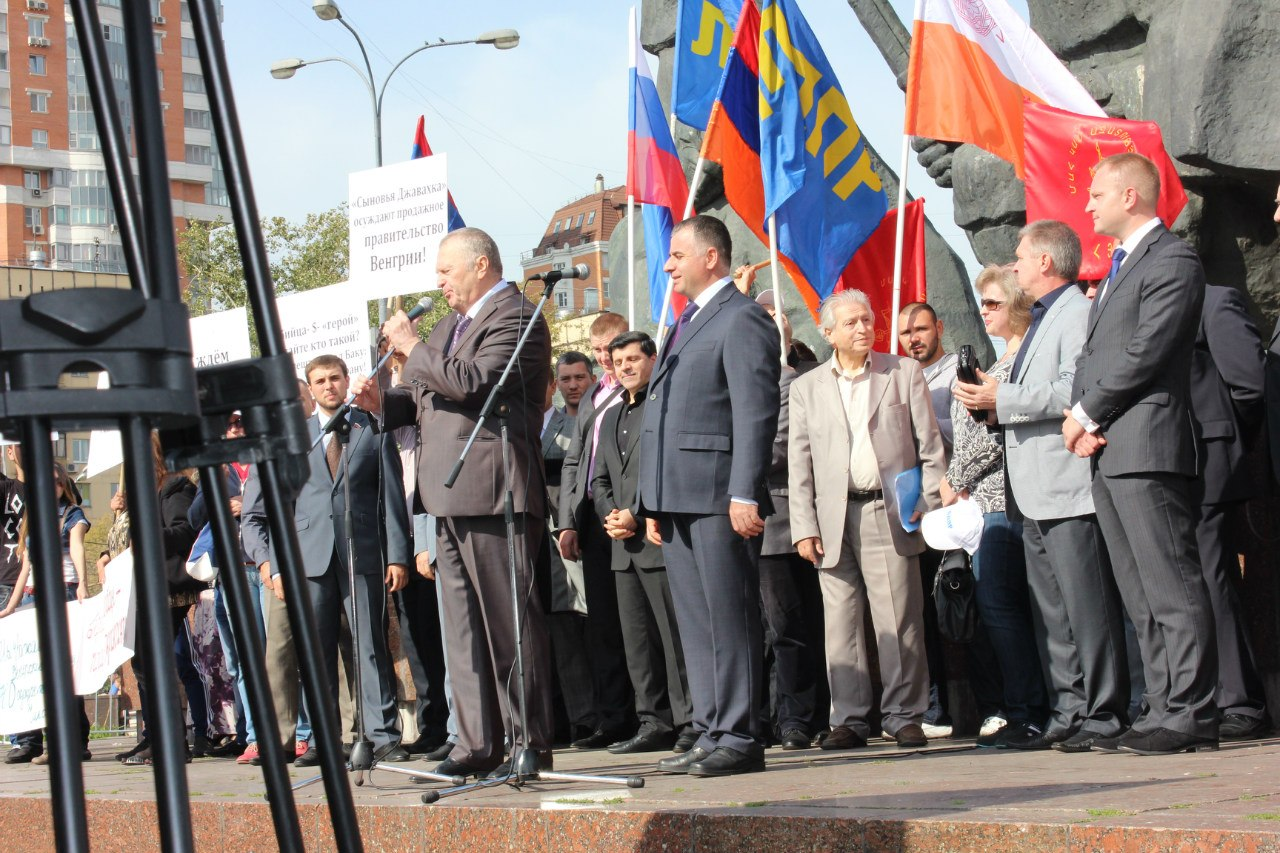
Protests against the extradition and pardon of Ramil Safarov, Azerbaijani military officer, who murdered Armenian officer Gurgen Margaryan during a NATO Partnership for Peace program, Summer 2012

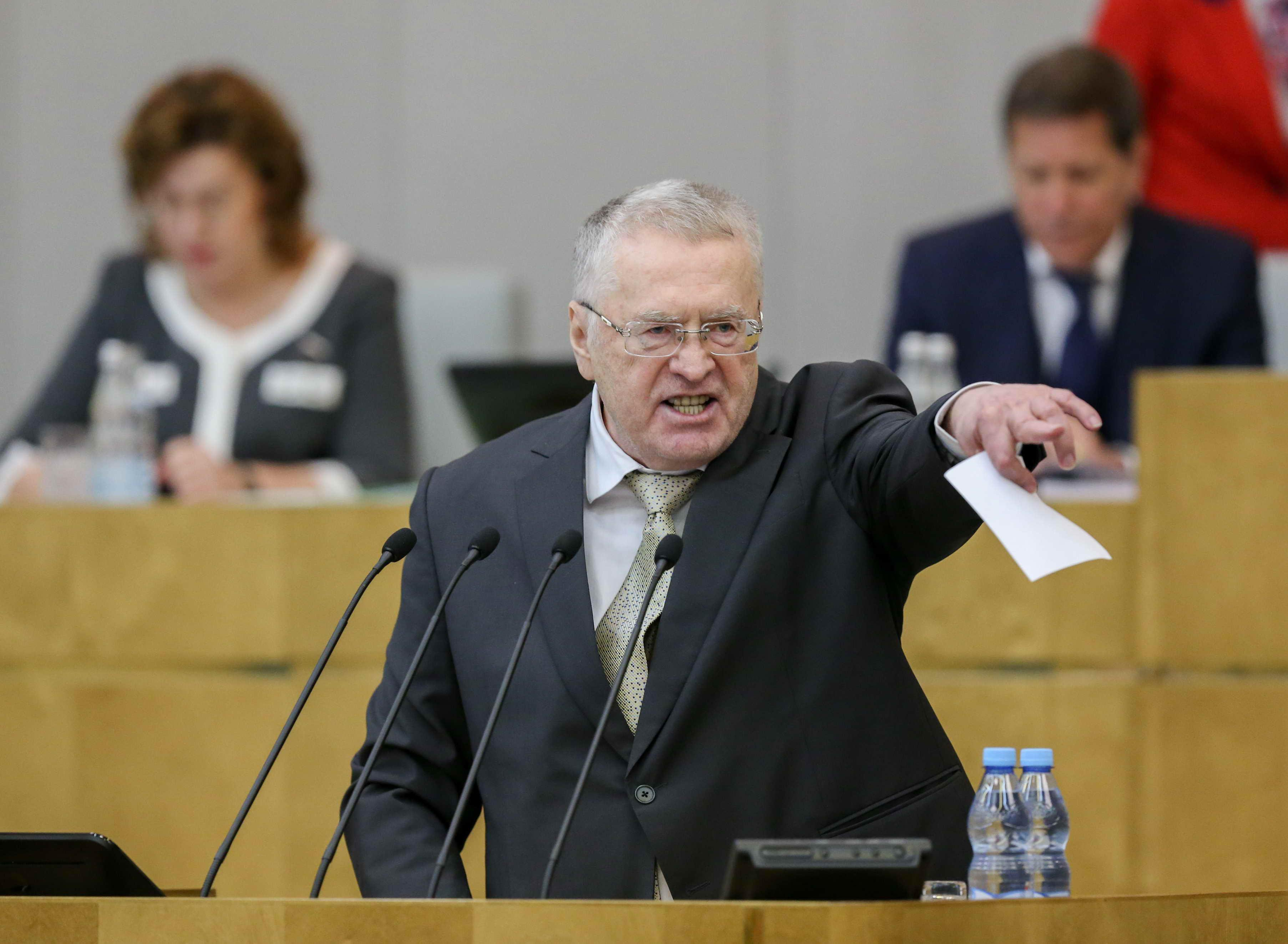
Zhirinovsky speaking in front of the State Duma, 2018

Zhirinovsky was known for his boasts pertaining to other countries, having expressed a desire to reunite countries of the ex-Soviet "near abroad" with Russia to within the Russia's borders of 1900 (including Finland and Poland). He advocated forcibly retaking Alaska from the United States (which would then become "a great place to put the Ukrainians"), turning Kazakhstan into "Russia's back yard", and provoking wars between the clans and the nations of the former Soviet Union and occupying what would remain of it after the wars. Zhirinovsky, who encouraged separatism within the Russian minority in the Baltic countries, endorsed the forcible re-occupation of these countries and said that nuclear waste should be dumped there.

Zhirinovsky supported Israel-Russia relations, but said that Israel had to make Russian its official language. He also believed Israel has to pay more attention to the Russian Orthodox Church, and that Russians are endangered in Israel and should come under the protection of the Russian police. Zhirinovsky led several official Russian delegations to Israel, on behalf of the Russian government. Visiting Israel, he said that he was concerned mainly about the economic situation for the more than one million Russians living in Israel. He also stated that "Russia will never allow any violence against Israel."

In the early 1990s, Zhirinovsky proposed setting up large fans on the Russian border to blow airborne radioactive waste into the Baltic states. To eradicate the bird flu, he proposed arming all of Russia's population and ordering them and the troops to shoot down migrating birds returning to Russia from wintering.

In 1994, Zhirinovsky sued Finland Swedish politician Jutta Zilliacus and the Swedish Theatre in Helsinki for defamation because Zilliacus had used the word "galenpanna", or "madcap", to describe him. In December 1994, the district court of Vantaa, Finland acquitted her.

Also in the 1990s, Zhirinovsky threatened to remove restrictions on arms sales to Iran and proposed selling the disputed Kuril Islands to Japan for US$50 billion.

In 1999, at the start of the Second Chechen War, Zhirinovsky, an ardent supporter of the first war in Chechnya in the mid-1990s, advocated hitting some Chechen villages with tactical nuclear weapons. He also advocated using nuclear weapons and naval blockade-imposed starvation in the event of a Russian war against Japan. In 2008, during the resulting political row between the United Kingdom and Russia, he suggested dropping nuclear bombs over the Atlantic Ocean in an effort to flood Britain.

Zhirinovsky hailed what he described as "the democratic process" in Iraq under Saddam Hussein, whom he supported strongly. The friendship dated from at least the Persian Gulf War in 1991, during which time Zhirinovsky sent several armed volunteers from the "Falcons of Zhirinovsky" group to support the Iraqi president. Allegations dogged Zhirinovsky after the fall of Baghdad asserting that he personally profited from illicit oil sales as part of the Oil-for Food scandal, a charge investigated in 2005 by the Independent Inquiry Committee into the Oil-for-Food Programme (Volcker Commission) and the U.S. Senate Permanent Subcommittee on Investigations (PSI). He was also close to the Serbian nationalist leader Vojislav Šešelj.

In a 2002 video, a drunken Zhirinovsky, hugging two young men, threatened George W. Bush using offensive language against a war in Iraq, promised him a cell in the Butyrka pre-detention facility, and suggested to strike on Tbilisi, or some other targets instead in coalition with Russia. He called the United States a "flea market" filled with "cocksuckers, jerkers, and faggots", and claimed that Russian scientists were able to change the gravitational field of the Earth and sink the entire country and elect a President in the US loyal to Russia. He mentioned Bill Clinton, Monica Lewinsky, and Condoleezza Rice in the video. Zhirinovsky called Rice "a black whore who needs a good cock. Send her here, one of our divisions will make her happy in the barracks one night. She will choke on Russian sperm as it will be leaking out of her ears ... until she crawls to the US embassy in Moscow on her knees."

Zhirinovsky said he dreamt of the day "when Russian soldiers can wash their boots in the warm waters of the Indian Ocean and switch to year-round summer uniforms" following Russia's conquest of Afghanistan, Iran, and Turkey and occupation of the Persian Gulf and the Mediterranean. He also declared that Bulgaria should annex the Republic of Macedonia, and said that Romania is an artificial state supposedly created by Italian Gypsies who seized territory from Russia, Bulgaria, and Hungary.

The country of Georgia was another frequent target of Zhirinovsky's rhetoric. After Aslan Abashidze was ousted from his position as leader of Ajara, an autonomous Georgian region power, in 2004, Zhirinovsky worried that similar revolutions would occur in Abkhazia and South Ossetia. Highly critical of Georgia's pro-Western line, he was an energetic supporter of the republic of Abkhazia that broke away from the Republic of Georgia. In a high-profile incident in August 2004, he departed on a campaign to promote a tourist season in Abkhazia aboard a cruise ship which was briefly intercepted by a Georgian coast guard vessel.

Zhirinovsky was expelled from Bulgaria for insulting its president and barred from entry in Germany. In 2005, Kazakhstan declared Zhirinovsky persona non grata on the territory of his historical homeland, due to his controversial speech about the change of the Russia-Kazakhstan border, in which he questioned the Kazakhs' place in history.

In 2006, Zhirinovsky became persona non grata in Ukraine as well, following his statements regarding the January 2006 Russia–Ukraine gas dispute. His ban was revoked in 2007. In reaction to U.S. Secretary of State Condoleezza Rice's criticism of Russian foreign policy during the dispute, Zhirinovsky stated, "Condoleezza Rice needs a company of soldiers [and] needs to be taken to barracks where she would be satisfied."

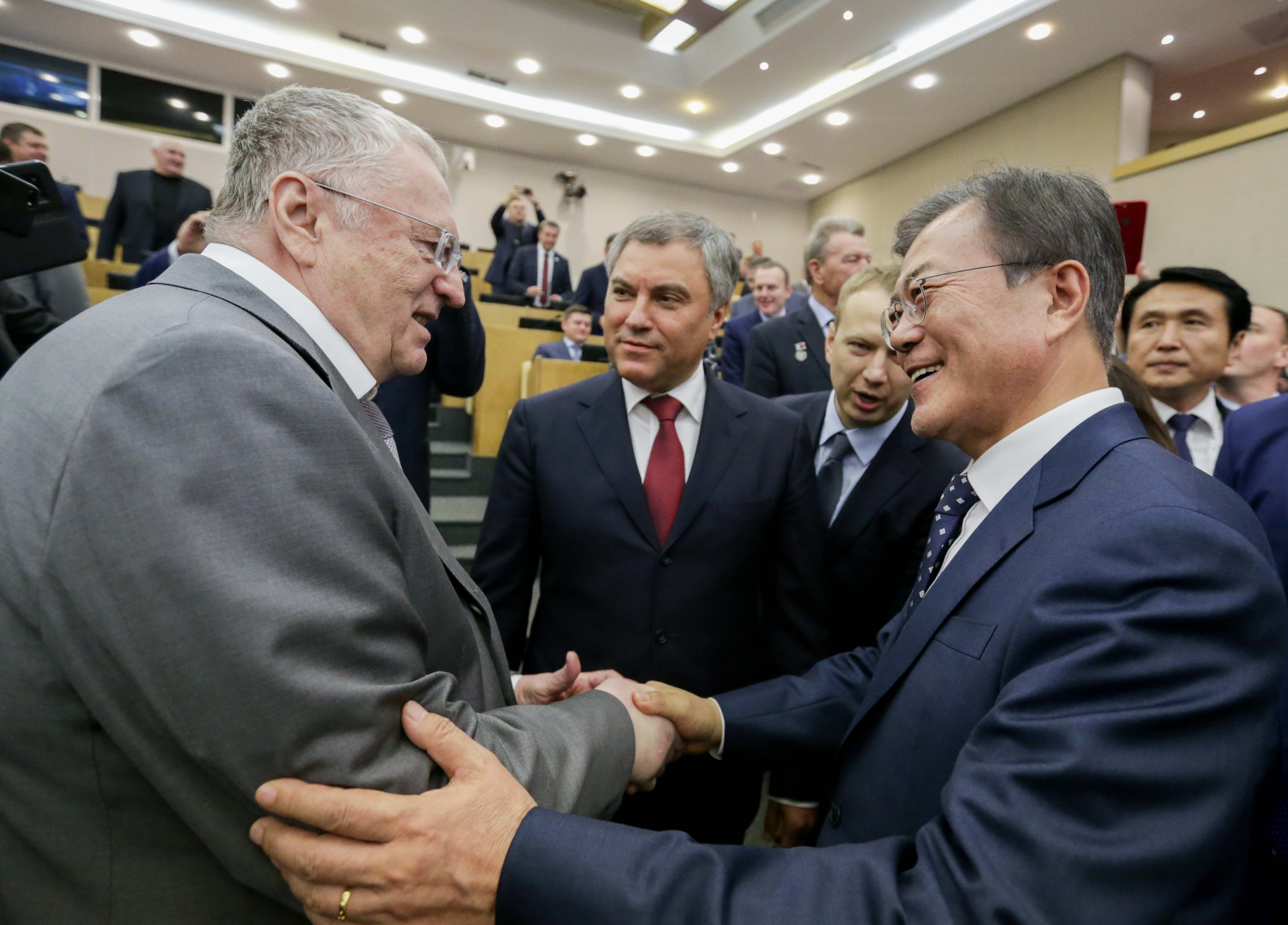
Zhirinovsky with South Korean President Moon Jae-in in June 2018

After the November 2006 death by poisoning of Russian defector Alexander Litvinenko in London, Zhirinovsky said: "Any traitor must be eliminated using any methods. If you have joined the special services to work, then you should work, but to betray, to run away abroad, to give up the secrets you learned while working – all of this looks bad." Sergei Abeltsev, Zhirinovsky's former bodyguard and State Duma member from the LDPR, added: "The deserved punishment reached the traitor. I am sure his terrible death will be a warning to all the traitors that in Russia treason is not to be forgiven. I would recommend to citizen Berezovsky to avoid any food at the commemoration for his criminal accomplice Litvinenko."

In the 2007 Russian election, political patronage from Zhirinovsky enabled Litvinenko murder suspect Andrei Lugovoi to win election to the Russian parliament and thus obtain formal parliamentary immunity. Zhirinovsky accused Great Britain (according to him, "the most barbaric country on the planet") of fomenting World War I, the October Revolution, World War II, and the dissolution of the Soviet Union.

After war broke out between Russia and Georgia in 2008, Zhirinovsky argued in favour of Russian recognition of Abkhazian and South Ossetian independence. "We should have taken the whole territory of Georgia under control," he complained, and "arrested all Georgian officers and taken them here, like to Guantanamo, arrested Saakashvili and handed him over for trial by a military tribunal and gone to the border with Turkey."

At the premiere of the film Taras Bulba in 2009, Zhirinovsky stated: "Everyone who sees the film will understand that Russians and Ukrainians are one people – and that the enemy is from the West".

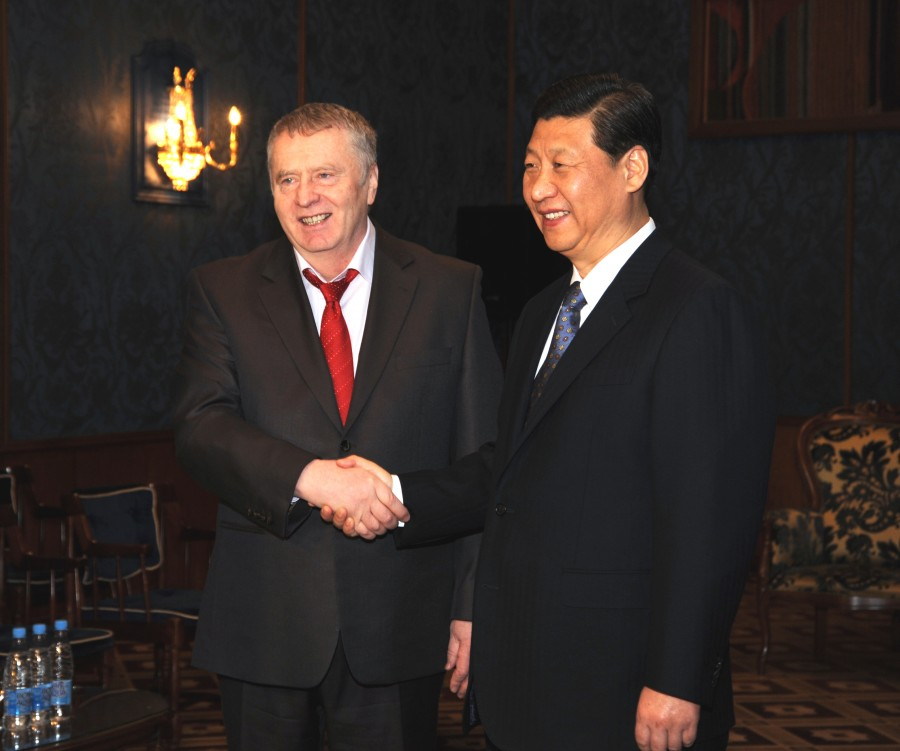
Zhirinovsky meeting with Chinese Vice President Xi Jinping in 2010 during his visit to Russia

Writing about Marine Le Pen, Zhirinovsky in 2011 said that she could out do her father because "Instead of saying that Islam is terrorism, she simply insists that France is a secular nation that will not stand for hundreds of thousands of Muslims practicing their religious traditions. With this argument, Marine has cleverly defended the French people's right to a secular nation." In that vein, Zhirinovsky said that she has the "chance to represent the French majority."

In 2013, when asked about former Ukrainian prime minister Yulia Tymoshenko, Zhirinovsky said, "Yulia Tymoshenko, I'm sorry, is a woman. I don't like them, as it's easier to persuade a woman. [...] Women are more compliant, and it's dangerous."

In the wake of the February 2013 Chelyabinsk meteor, Zhirinovsky was quoted by the Russian International News Agency as claiming "It's not meteors falling, it's the test of a new weapon by the Americans." At the same time, he derided the Russian Academy of Sciences for anarchism and having scientists so old that their brains and reproductive organs no longer worked, telling the "elders" to go home and collect their pensions.

On 4 April 2014, in the wake of the annexation of Crimea, McDonald's fast-food restaurant franchises in Russia were unable to continue operating after being cut off by their Ukrainian franchisor. Zhirinovsky suggested that McDonald's "should be evicted from Russia" for the affront. On 25 July, amidst the war in Donbas, the Ukrainian Interior Ministry launched criminal proceedings against Zhirinovsky and Communist Party of the Russian Federation leader Gennady Zyuganov for "financing actions aimed at changing the boundaries of the territory and the state border of Ukraine". In August, Zhirinovsky threatened Poland and the Baltic states with carpet bombing, dooming them all to be wiped out. He also sent letters to the governments of Poland, Romania and Hungary suggesting that Ukraine be divided between Russia and these three countries.

"What will remain of the Baltics? Nothing will remain of them. NATO airplanes are stationed there. There's an anti-missile defense system. In Poland – the Baltics – they are on the whole doomed. They'll be wiped out.

There will be nothing left. Let them re-think this, these leaders of these little dwarf states. How they are leaving themselves vulnerable.

Nothing threatens America, it's far away. But Eastern Europe countries will place themselves under the threat of total annihilation. Only they themselves will be to blame. Because we cannot allow missiles and planes to be aimed at Russia from their territories. We have to destroy them half an hour before they launch. And then we have to do carpet bombing so that not a single launch pad remains or even one plane. So – no Baltics, no Poland. Let NATO immediately ask for negotiations with our Foreign Ministry. Then we'll stop. Otherwise well have to teach them the lessons of May 1945."

In May 2015, Zhirinovsky stated that former President of Georgia and then-Odessa governor Mikheil Saakashvili should be killed. "We will shoot all of your governors, starting with Saakashvili, then they'll be afraid. And there will be a different situation in Europe and Ukraine. ... Let's aim at Berlin, Brussels, London, and Washington." He then said Ukrainian political prisoner Nadiya Savchenko should be shot and hanged in Belgrade.

In November 2015, after a Turkish F-16 fighter shot down a Russian Sukhoi Su-24M jet near the Syria–Turkey border, Zhirinovsky said in a speech to the Duma that Russia must detonate a nuclear bomb on the Bosphorus to create a 10-meter-high tsunami wave to wipe out at least 9 million Istanbul residents.

In August 2016, Zhirinovsky prayed for the Republican U.S. presidential election nominee, Donald Trump to defeat Hillary Clinton, whom he considered dangerous, in order to take his party's ideology global. He also expressed his desire to test his DNA to determine whether he and Trump were related. In September 2016, inspired by Donald Trump's border wall policy, Zhirinovsky proposed building a border wall and banning Muslims from entering Russia. In October, Zhirinovsky in an interview said that a vote for Hillary Clinton in the U.S. presidential election was a vote for a third World War, leading to Hiroshimas and Nagasakis everywhere. In contrast, he stated, Trump wouldn't care about Syria, Libya, Iraq, and Ukraine, and thus represented a more peaceful alternative.

In April 2017, Zhirinovsky promised to drink champagne if Donald Trump were impeached, saying: "A half of Americans voted for different foreign policies. Trump breaks his promises, and if he continues breaking them, his impeachment is inevitable." Following the 2021 United States Capitol attack, Zhirinovsky praised Trump and tweeted: "Be brave Donald. We're with you, you'll get help from abroad."

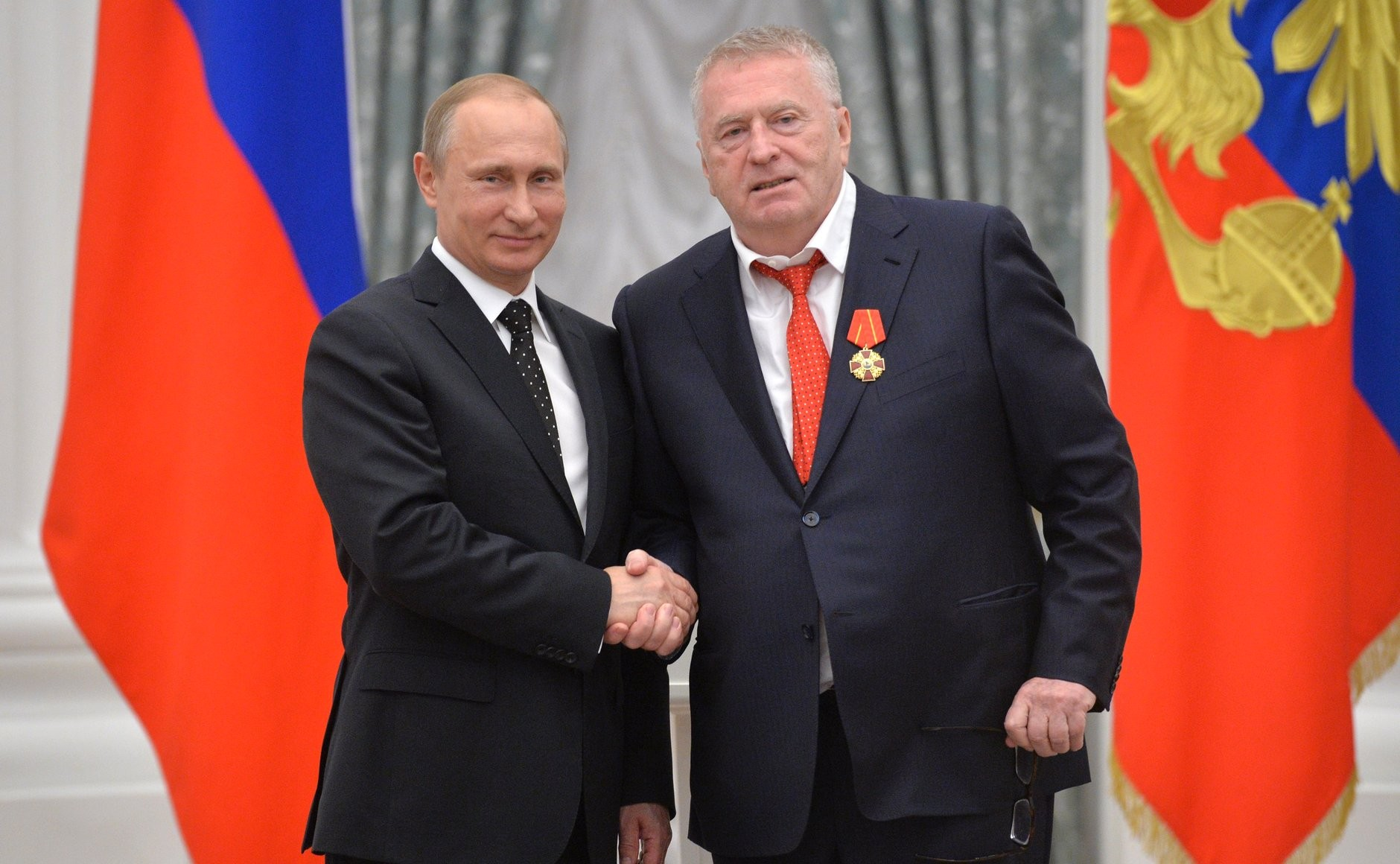
Zhirinovsky receiving the Order of Alexander Nevsky from Vladimir Putin in 2015

In a speech on 27 December 2021, Zhirinovsky appeared to almost predict the day of the Russian invasion of Ukraine of 24 February 2022, stating: "We shouldn't saber rattle, [we] need to say: let's comply [with the conditions demanded by Russia], and if you refuse, then we can apply another agenda. And which one — you will feel it, at 4 o'clock in the morning, on February 22. I would wish 2022 to be a peaceful year, but I love the truth, for 75 years I have been telling the truth. It will not be a peaceful year. It will be a year when Russia eventually becomes a great country, and everyone must shut up and respect our country, otherwise they shut our mouth and start exterminate Russians first in Donbass and then in western Russia, so let's in this way appreciate a new direction of foreign policy of Russia."

== Threatening behaviour and assaults ==
Zhirinovsky had a history of personal violence in political contexts. In his debate with Boris Nemtsov in 1995, Zhirinovsky threw a glass of orange juice at him on live television. In 2003, he engaged in a fistfight following a television debate with Mikhail Delyagin. In 2005, Zhirinovsky ignited a brawl in parliament by spitting at Rodina party legislator Andrei Saveliyev. In 2008, he showed himself shooting a rifle at targets representing his political rivals.

In 2005, at one of the meetings of the State Duma of the fourth convocation, Zhirinovsky publicly expressed disagreement with the result of the parliamentary elections in the Yamalo-Nenets Autonomous Okrug, where United Russia won, and demonstratively left the meeting room. Passing by the Rodina faction, he got into an argument with Ivan Viktorov. Viktorov's colleague Andrey Savelyev, commenting on the dispute between Zhirinovsky and Viktorov, noted that "spittle is flying": in response to this, Zhirinovsky spat at Savelyev, and a fight immediately broke out with the participation of members of the LDPR (including Sergey Abeltsev). As NTV channel reporter Alexey Pivovarov reported, some time ago, Savelyev had already had a fight with Zhirinovsky on television during a discussion of a national issue. The then-head of the Rodina faction, Dmitry Rogozin, demanded that Zhirinovsky be deprived of his post as vice-speaker of the State Duma and that a criminal case be opened against him, and Savelyev filed a statement with the prosecutor's office.

During the 2008 televised presidential debate, Zhirinovsky threatened Nikolai Gotsa, representative of Democratic Party of Russia candidate Andrei Bogdanov, with violence, saying he was going to "smash his head" and ordering his bodyguard to "shoot that bastard over there in the corridor". Gotsa sued Zhirinovsky in civil court for 1 million rubles (approximately US$38,000) in damages and was eventually awarded 30,000 rubles (approximately US$1,150).

At an April 2014 press conference in the Duma, Zhirinovsky made violent verbal threats against Stella Dubovitskaya, a pregnant Rossiya Segodnya journalist, who asked him about possible sanctions against Ukraine in the wake of Russia's Crimean annexation. When asked whether Russians should reciprocate in kind after Ukrainians initiated a sex strike against Russian men, Zhirinovsky replied that all Ukrainian women were "nymphomaniacs", and that Dubovitskaya was as well. He then ordered two of his aides to "violently rape" the journalist, who had to be briefly hospitalized for shock. He later apologized, adding that he "spoke a bit rudely when I replied to a young woman".

=== Sexual assault accusation ===
In March 2018, male journalist Renat Davletgildeyev accused Zhirinovsky of sexual harassment, despite his public expression of homophobic positions.

== Personal life ==
Zhirinovsky married Galina Lebedeva, a lawyer and daughter of a retired general in the early 1970s. The couple had three children: two sons and a daughter.

Ilya Ponomarev had alleged Zhirinovsky was gay in a 2017 interview given in Ukraine. In 1996, openly gay journalist Yaroslav Mogutin suggested it was "a foregone conclusion" that Zhirinovsky was gay, according to Russia's gay intelligentsia (university-educated people) in The Advocate.

Zhirinovsky was a polyglot and was fluent in English, French, German, and Turkish.

=== Illness and death ===
In February 2022, Zhirinovsky was hospitalized in critical condition in Moscow with COVID-19. In March, he was reportedly placed in a medically induced coma, and underwent treatment for COVID-19 complications such as sepsis and respiratory failure. Zhirinovsky claimed to have been vaccinated against COVID-19 eight times.

On 25 March 2022, Zhirinovsky was reported to have died in a hospital. Despite confirmation from several sources, including his own political party, the news was quickly denied by family members. On 6 April 2022, Vyacheslav Volodin, the Speaker of the Duma, announced that Zhirinovsky had died following a long illness. He was 75. In a statement after Zhirinovsky died, president Vladimir Putin said he "always defended his patriotic position and Russia's interests before any audience and in the fiercest of debates".

Zhirinovsky's funeral was officiated by Patriarch Kirill of Moscow and all Rus' in the Cathedral of Christ the Saviour in Moscow, at the presence of several high-ranking politicians, including Putin, Volodin and Minister of Defence Sergei Shoigu.

== Legacy ==
On 6 April 2023, a monument to Zhirinovsky was unveiled at the Novodevichy Cemetery in Moscow.

== See also ==
- Aleksandr Dugin
- Rashism
- Russian nationalism
- List of members of the State Duma of Russia who died in office

Party political offices
Preceded by Party created	Liberal Democratic Party leader 1991–2022	Succeeded by Leonid Slutsky
Preceded by Party created New title	Liberal Democratic Party presidential candidate 1991, 1996, 2000	Succeeded by Oleg Malyshkin
Preceded by Oleg Malyshkin	Liberal Democratic Party presidential candidate 2008, 2012, 2018	Succeeded by Last election
