= Liberal Democratic Party of the Soviet Union =

Liberal Democratic Party of the Soviet Union Либерально-демократическая партия Советского Союза
- Leader: Vladimir Zhirinovsky
- Founders: Vladimir Bogachov; Vladimir Zhirinovsky
- Founded: 13 December 1989; 36 years ago
- Dissolved: 18 April 1992; 34 years ago
- Succeeded by: Liberal Democratic Party of Russia; Liberal Democratic Party of Belarus; Liberal Democratic Party of Ukraine; Liberal Democratic Party of Transnistria
- Headquarters: Moscow, Russia
- Ideology: Right-wing populism Russian ultranationalism Before 1990: Liberalism (Russian)
- Political position: Right-wing to far-right Before 1990: Centre-right
- Colours: Gold Blue

Party flag

The Liberal Democratic Party of the Soviet Union (LDPSU; Russian: Либерально-демократическая партия Советского Союза (ЛДПСС), romanized: Liberal'no-demokraticheskaya partiya Sovetskogo Soyuza (LDPSS)) was a political party in the Soviet Union which preceded the modern-day Liberal Democratic Party of Russia (LDPR), the Liberal Democratic Party of Belarus, the Liberal Democratic Party of Ukraine, and the Liberal Democratic Party of Transnistria.

== History ==
An effectively multi-party system emerged in the Soviet Union in the late 1980s in wake of the Gorbachev reforms. In March 1990, Article 6 of the Soviet Constitution, which ensured the Communist Party of the Soviet Union (CPSU) a monopoly on power, was amended to allow other political parties to hold public office. This gave room to the rise of other political parties, specifically the LDPSU. In April 1991, the LDPSU became the second officially registered party in the country.

Former KGB General Philipp Bobkov has stated that "in line with Zubatov's ideas," the Central Committee of the Communist Party of the Soviet Union "proposed creating a pseudo-party controlled by the KGB" to direct the interests and sentiments of certain social groups, however he said that he was against the idea. Former Politburo member Alexander Yakovlev described how KGB director Vladimir Kryuchkov proposed the creation of the party with Soviet leader Mikhail Gorbachev at a meeting. He also stated that the Central Committee took over which led to the creation of the Liberal Democratic Party. Yakovlev called the creation of the party a joint effort of the Central Committee and the KGB.

The outspoken leader of LDPSU Vladimir Zhirinovsky gained 8% of votes during the 1991 presidential elections. He also supported the August 1991 coup attempt.

Following the dissolution of the Soviet Union, the Russian section of the LDPSU became the Liberal Democratic Party of Russia (LDPR), the Belarusian section became the Liberal Democratic Party of Belarus (LDPB), and the Ukrainian section became the Liberal Democratic Party of Ukraine (LDPU), which unlike the Russian and Belarusian political parties has remained liberal in ideology.
