= Yumashev =

Yumashev, also spelled Yumasheva (feminine), may refer to:

- Andrey Borisovich Yumashev (1902-1988), Soviet aviator
- Ivan Stepanovich Yumashev (1895-1972), Soviet admiral
- Tatyana Yumasheva (b. 1960), daughter of former Russian President Boris Yeltsin
- Valentin Yumashev (b. 1957), Russian journalist and politician
