= Boris Yeltsin 1996 presidential campaign =

- Campaign: 1996 Russian presidential election
- Candidate: Boris Yeltsin; President of Russia (1991–1999)
- Affiliation: Independent
- Status: Announced: 15 February 1996; Registered: 3 April 1996; Advanced to runoff: 16 June 1996; Won election: 3 July 1996
- Headquarters: President-Hotel in Moscow
- Key people: Anatoly Chubais (campaign manager and chairman of campaign council); Oleg Soskovets (campaign manager); Tatyana Dyachenko (key advisor and member of campaign council); Sergey Filatov (campaign organizer, head of campaign headquarters, co-head of ODOPP); Viktor Ilyushin (member of campaign council, co-head of ODOPP); Yury Yarov (executive head, member of campaign council)
- Slogan: Now we are united!

The Boris Yeltsin presidential campaign, 1996 was the reelection campaign of Russian president Boris Yeltsin in the 1996 election.

Yeltsin was ultimately reelected, despite having originally been greatly expected to lose the election due to an immensely low level of public support prior to the official launch of his campaign. He was able to accomplish this due to a number of strategies and factors, including benefitting campaign spending which far exceeded the limits set by election laws, benefitting from an immense media bias in his favor, utilizing the advantages of his office, campaigning vigorously ahead of the first round, painting Communist Party nominee Gennady Zyuganov (his chief opponent) negatively, actively working to convince the Russian electorate that there existed a duopoly which left them no other choice but Yeltsin or Zyuganov (and convincing them that Yeltsin was the lesser of two evils), and repositioning himself to better appeal to the electorate.

== Background ==
Yelstin's approval had tanked after he had introduced significant reforms meant to push Russia towards a market-based economy. He had eliminated the majority of Soviet-era price controls, privatized a large number of significant state assets, permitted the ownership of private property, welcomed free-market principles, and additionally allowed for a stock exchange to be established and for commodities exchanges and private banks to be created. While some Russians (largely oligarchs) thrived under his reforms, many others faced significant hardships as a result of them. A significant portion of the Russian populace had faced increased poverty under his leadership. Additionally, crime rates had significantly increased during his presidency.

Yeltsin had originally risen to power on a populist message of anticorruption and an opponent of Moscow's establishment politics. A political maverick, he was cast-out by the Soviet political establishment. He found a base of support among liberal and pro-western democratic movements. In 1990, those movements united to form the Democratic Russia. This group held a base of power primarily in Moscow, Saint Petersburg, and the Urals. This political alliance brought him into power in June 1991, and helped him to resist a coup attempt in August 1991. The alliance formed the base of Russia's first noncommunist government. However, this alliance never merged into a single political organization. Yeltsin never officially joined the front, intending to maintain a level of separation between himself and partisan politics. Thus, it consequentially splintered, leaving him without a unified base of support.

Under Yeltsin's leadership, Russia faced the stigma of being a fallen international superpower. Russia encountered a massive amount of corruption and lawlessness. Russia's economy also faced a decline in industrial production and the Russian populace's qualify of life and life expectancy declined.

As president, Yeltsin had allowed for a far more free media to exist than his Soviet predecessors had. In doing so, he not only allowed Russians to enjoy Western pop-culture, but he also permitted open criticism of his own leadership to be published by the press.

Yeltsin promised in May 1992 that he would "absolutely" not seek a second term. However, observers doubted the authenticity of this declaration. No Kremlin leader in 1,000 years had voluntarily stepped aside to make way for a successor.

1993

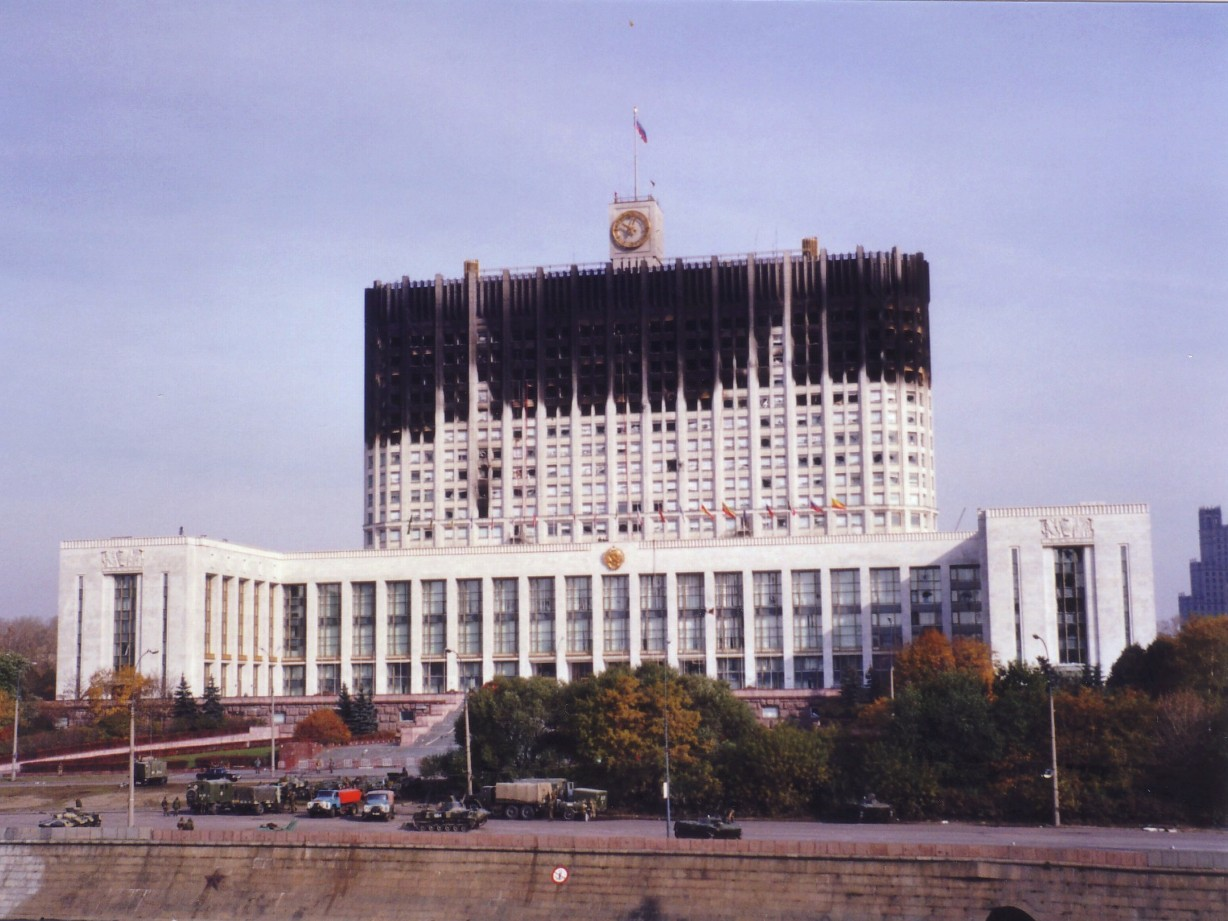
Burnt White House following the 1993 constitutional crisis

Following the 1993 Russian constitutional crisis, the Yeltsin government adopted a more nationalist and authoritarian agenda than they had previously championed. Yeltsin saw a favorable result in the 1993 constitutional referendum vote.

However, at the same time as the constitutional referendum, the pro-Yeltsin and pro-reform Russia's Choice party fared disastrously in the legislative elections. Russia's Choice might have seen their prospects harmed by Yeltsin's own refusal to officially align himself with or endorse the party. A reason for Yeltsin's refusal to voice his support of the party might have been a desire of Yeltsin's to continue to separate himself from partisan politics, while another reason might have been tension between Yeltsin and key members of the Russia's Choice party such as Yegor Gaidar and Boris Fyodorov. Nevertheless, the party had been expected to garner as much as a 40% plurality of the vote. However, the party instead garnered merely 15.5% of the votes, placing behind Vladimir Zhirinovsky's Liberal Democratic Party, which received 22.9% of the vote. Zhirinovsky had successfully appealed to a chunk of the Russian electorate that had grown tired of both the communist leadership of the past and the current "democratic" leadership under Yeltsin. Zhirinovsky had espoused a protofascist views and "law-and-order" rhetoric laced with racist undertones. Combined, the core reformist (pro-Yeltsin) parties, including the Russia's Choice and Party of Russian Unity and Accord, received a mere 27.5% of the vote, whilst the core opposition parties received 43.3%. The underperformance of the pro-Yeltsin forces in the 1993 legislative election alarmed some in Yelstin's camp of an urgent need for Yeltsin to revive his faltering public image.

1994

Over the course of 1994, Yeltsin became more and more separated from core reformist politicians and organizations. At the same time, Yeltsin was also becoming more and more separated from the coalition government and its leader, Prime Minister Viktor Chernomyrdin. Instead, Yeltsin increasingly relied on the advice of First Deputy Prime Minister Oleg Soskovets and his own bodyguard and confidant Alexander Korzhakov. Soskovets had been shaping Yeltsin's campaign strategy.

1995

Our Home Russia fared poorly in the 1995 legislative election

The result 1995 legislative election was not better for Yeltsin. Core reformist (pro-Yeltsin) parties performed marginally worse than 1993, receiving a combined 25.5% of the vote. Core opposition parties garnered 42.5% of the vote.

The opposition Communist Party gained power in the 1995 legislative election. Its leader, Gennady Zyuganov, had a strong grassroots organization, especially in the rural areas and small towns. Zyuganov had appealed effectively to nostalgia for an era of Soviet prestige on the international stage and socialist domestic order. It was already clear at this time that Zyuganov was going to challenge Yeltsin for the presidency the following year.

In the 1995 legislative elections, Zhirinovsky's Liberal Democratic Party placed second with 11.18% of the vote. Prime Minister Viktor Chernomyrdin's centrist, non-reformist, party Our Home – Russia won 10.13%, placing third.

The result of the 1995 legislative elections seemed to further indicate that support for Yeltsin's reformists was indeed in political decline. The largest reformist party at the time, Grigory Yavlinsky's Yabloko won only 6.9% of the vote. The next-largest reformist party, Yegor Gaidar's Democratic Choice of Russia, won a paltry 3.9%. Yeltsin's advisers viewed this as evidence that it would be disastrous for Yeltsin to campaign as a reformist/democrat. Indeed, polling in December placed Yeltsin behind both Zyuganov and Zhirinovsky.

== Campaign strategies ==
=== Soskovets strategy ===
Yeltsin's original, abandoned, campaign strategy had been devised by Oleg Soskovets in response to the defeat of pro-Yeltsin parties in the 1993 and 1995 legislative elections. Soskovets decided that for Yeltsin to win in 1996, he would need to adopt some of Zhirinovsky's style of rhetoric. Soskovets worked alongside others, such as Alexander Korzhakov, to devise a strategy. According to their strategy, Yelstin would need to position himself as an intermediate between the reformers and the Zhirinovsky-style protofascists by adopting the platforms of both. Yeltsin initially obliged, and took action to pivot and adjust his image accordingly.

=== Abandonment of Soskovets strategy ===
In late-January 1996, members of Yeltsin's inner-circle began to inform him that they were worried that Soskovets' strategy was a losing strategy. At the same time, Soskovets' standing with Yeltsin was severely harmed after he failed to complete the campaign's signature drive by the deadline that Yeltsin had assigned him.

By February, Yeltsin had begun to abandon Soskovets' advice. At this time, several shadow campaigns were hard at work to support Yeltsin's candidacy, and were developing alternative campaign strategies for Yeltsin to adopt. By early February, Sergey Filatov (a former member of Yeltsin's government) had been appointed as the interim head of the campaign headquarters. Filatov was also tasked with laying the groundwork for Yeltsin's official campaign committee. Filatov's appointment consequentially supplanted much of Soskovets' authority within the campaign.

On March 23, in a meeting with Anatoly Chubais and members of Semibankirschina that polling showed him to be headed towards a defeat.

Panic stuck Yeltsin's inner circle after their meeting with the Semisbankirschina made it clear to them that the opinion polls indicated that Yeltsin could not win. Some members of the inner-circle, such as Alexander Korzhakov, urged Yeltsin to cancel or postpone the election in order to prevent a Communist victory. Others, such as Yegor Gaidar, urged Yeltsin to forgo seeking a second term, so that they could instead run a reform-minded candidate that would capable of winning the election.

Instead of abandoning his candidacy, Yeltsin reorganized his campaign organization. Yeltsin's own daughter Tatyana Dyachenko was instrumental in convincing him to replace Soskovets as his campaign head. While Yelstin distrusted his campaign advisors, he placed great trust in the advice of his daughter. On March 23, day after the meeting with the Semibankirschina team, Yeltsin fired Soskovets, officially ending the Soskovets campaign strategy.

=== Adoption of a new campaign strategy ===
The campaign's revised strategy became more clear after liberal figures solidified their control of the campaigns central leadership. They rejected the premise of the earlier Soskovets campaign strategy, believing that trying to appeal towards communists and fascists would be a losing strategy. Instead, they formed an entirely new strategy for his campaign.

Russia lacked a strong party system, thus partisan divides were less a factor for campaigns than they were in democracies with more developed party systems, such as France, the United Kingdom and the United States. In both the 1993 and 1995 parliamentary elections, half of Russia's parliamentary seats were decided by voting in single-mandate districts. However, the other half was determined by a national system of proportional representation. Proportional representation encouraged the existence of a plethora of political parties and little incentive for party consolidation. In 1993, thirteen separate parties contested in legislative elections. In 1995, forty-three different parties did. This was seen by the campaign's new leadership as being problematic to Yeltsin's candidacy. They believed that in order to win he would need to convince voters that he was the lesser evil, which he would be unable to effectively do without first convincing voters that they had only two options. Essentially, the strategy was to manufacture a public perception that there existed a political duopoly consisting of Yeltsin and Zyuganov's Communist Party. They would instill such a perception in spite of the fact that Russia had a multi-party system.

Under their new strategy, the campaign would work to recast Yeltsin as an individual single-handedly fighting to stave off communist control. The campaign framed a narrative that portrayed Yeltsin as Russia's best hope for stability.

Under their new strategy, the campaign would also work to shift the narrative of the election into a referendum on whether voters wanted to return to their communist past (with Zyuganov), or continue with reforms (with Yeltsin). Rather than painting a new detailed vision for the direction in which he would take the nation during his second term, Yeltsin would provide voters assurances that the economic payoff of his reforms was around the corner, as well as stoke fears that Russia's economic situation would only worsen under communist leadership. The decision to frame the election as a referendum on whether Russia should move forward towards a market economy or move backwards towards communism would prove to be one of the more important decisions that contributed the campaign's ultimate victory.

Also important to the campaign's new strategy was to highlight the left's radical views and to portray Zyuganov as a government bureaucrat with no practical leadership experience.

Under their new strategy, the campaign sought to replicate factors that had previously contributed to his victories in the 1991 presidential election and the 1993 referendums. One factor that it sought to replicate was the public's perception of his leadership. In 1991, Yeltsin had been widely seen as a vigorous leader. This was no longer the case. Thus, Yeltsin took an active approach to campaigning in order to project a revival of vigor. Another factor was for Yeltsin to exacerbate the divide between the moderate and radical sides of the left-wing and to capitalize off of the resulting political polarization between factions of the left-wing. Yet another factor he replicated was the allocation of funds to popular causes, something he had also done in advance of the 1991 election and 1994 referendum. He also repeated tactics used in 1991 and 1993 by firing unpopular officials, slowing down the pace of economic reforms (a plurality of Russians felt that the reforms needed to be more gradual), and promising to pivot a number policies in the direction favored by the public. Another factor was to create an overwhelmingly pro-Yelstin media bias, similar to the one that Yeltsin had benefited from in the leadup to the 1993 referendums.

== Campaigning in first round ==
=== Early developments ===
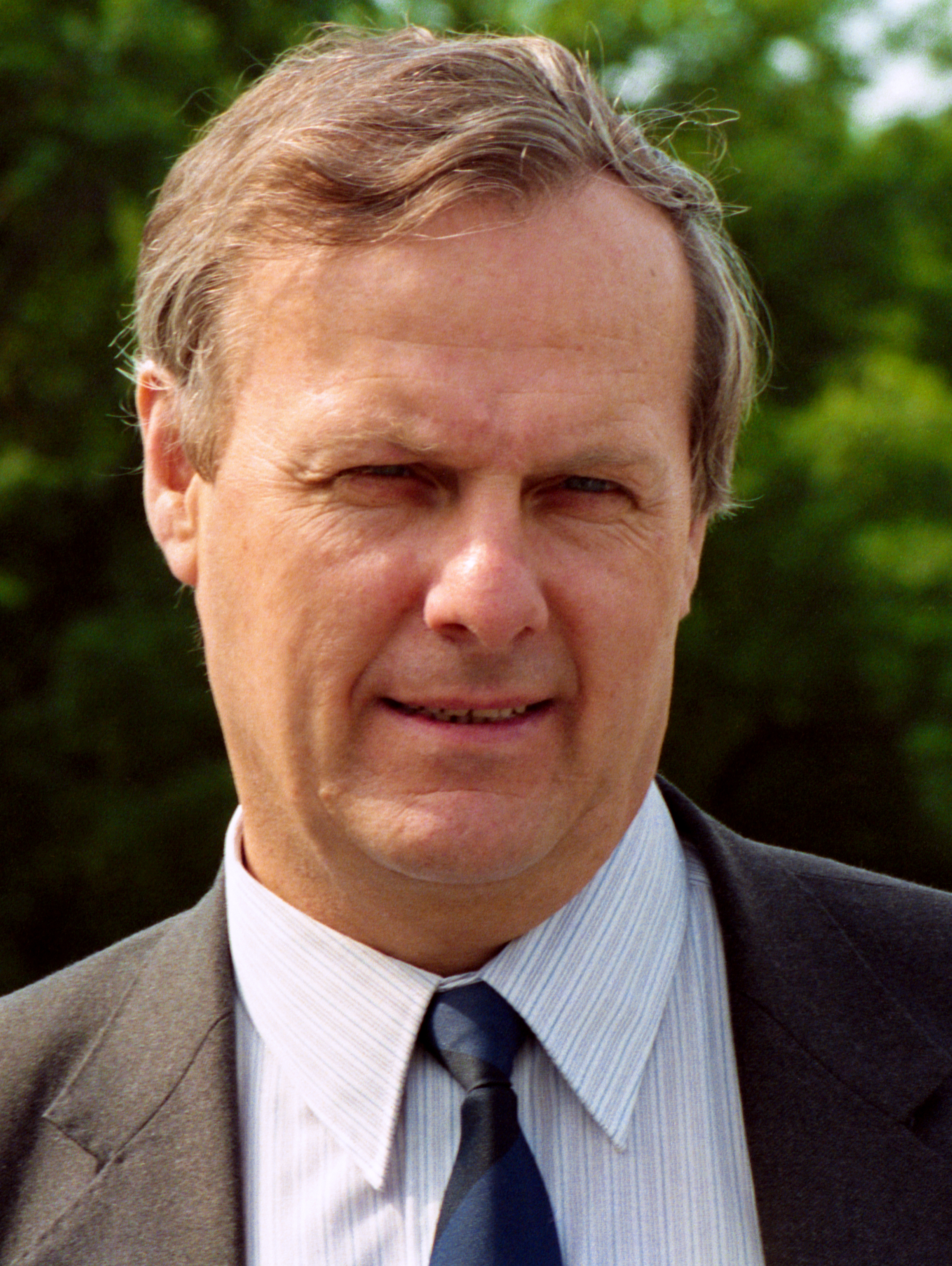
Anatoly Sobchak, then Mayor of St. Petersburg, was considered to run for president instead of Yeltsin

Many predicted that Russia would succumb to the same trend as many other post-Soviet transition democracies, where nationalist politicians unseated incumbent leaders.

Before Yeltsin announced his intention to seek a second term, there was speculation that he would retire from politics due to his ailing health and the growing disapproval of his performance. At the time Yeltsin was recuperating from a series of heart attacks. Despite some efforts to revive the public's perception, Yeltsin still possessed a strongly negative image, with both domestic and international observers taking note his occasionally erratic behavior. Additionally, amid the aforementioned economic decline, Yeltsin encountered poor optics by enjoying the benefits of power, enjoying luxuries he himself had once criticized Soviet leaders for, such as chauffeured limos. Yeltsin's popularity came close to zero.

According to the former Kremlin Chief of Staff Sergey Filatov, Yeltsin initially did not plan to participate in the elections, but with the success of the Communist party in the legislative elections, he changed this decision. Former Yeltsin adviser Sergey Stankevich claimed that then Mayor of St. Petersburg Anatoly Sobchak was considered as a candidate for the presidency instead of Yeltsin, as Sobchak had all the necessary resources and was seen to have a chance of winning. However, at the end of 1995 Sobchak finally abandoned this idea, and Yeltsin still decided to seek re-election.

In January 1996, Yeltsin distributed an internal memo, which was soon leaked in the press. The memo urged his government to undertake radical measures to ensure he would retain power. One of the suggested actions was to dismiss regional governors that did not provide a sufficient level of support to Our Home – Russia during the 1995 legislative elections. Other actions suggested in the memo were to channel government money into his election campaign, use state-run media to bolster his candidacy, cut funding to state-owned regional newspapers that supported opposition candidates, and to ensure that positions in the Central Election Commission were occupied by individuals favoring Yeltsin.

On January 22, 1996, and Yeltsin stated that he would announce the final decision on whether he was going to run sometime between February 13 and 15. Yeltsin commented,

I realize that if I agree [to run], the struggle will be tough...Those who [I would] be running against are not exactly ordinary people, but we'll organize the campaign taking account of the experience in other countries.

By this time, it was widely anticipated that, despite his unpopularity, Yeltsin was going to seek reelection.

The days leading up to the announcement were characterized by a number of figures with connections to Yeltsin signaling whether or not they would support his reelection campaign. For instance, on February 5, 1996, Vyacheslav Kostikov, Yeltsin's former spokesman, indicated his opposition to Yeltsin's candidacy by delivering a crass and harshly-worded rebuke of the President. On February 8, Prime Minister Chernomyrdin denied long-standing rumors that he would seek presidency himself, declaring that Yeltsin had his, "complete and unconditional support."

=== Announcement of candidacy ===
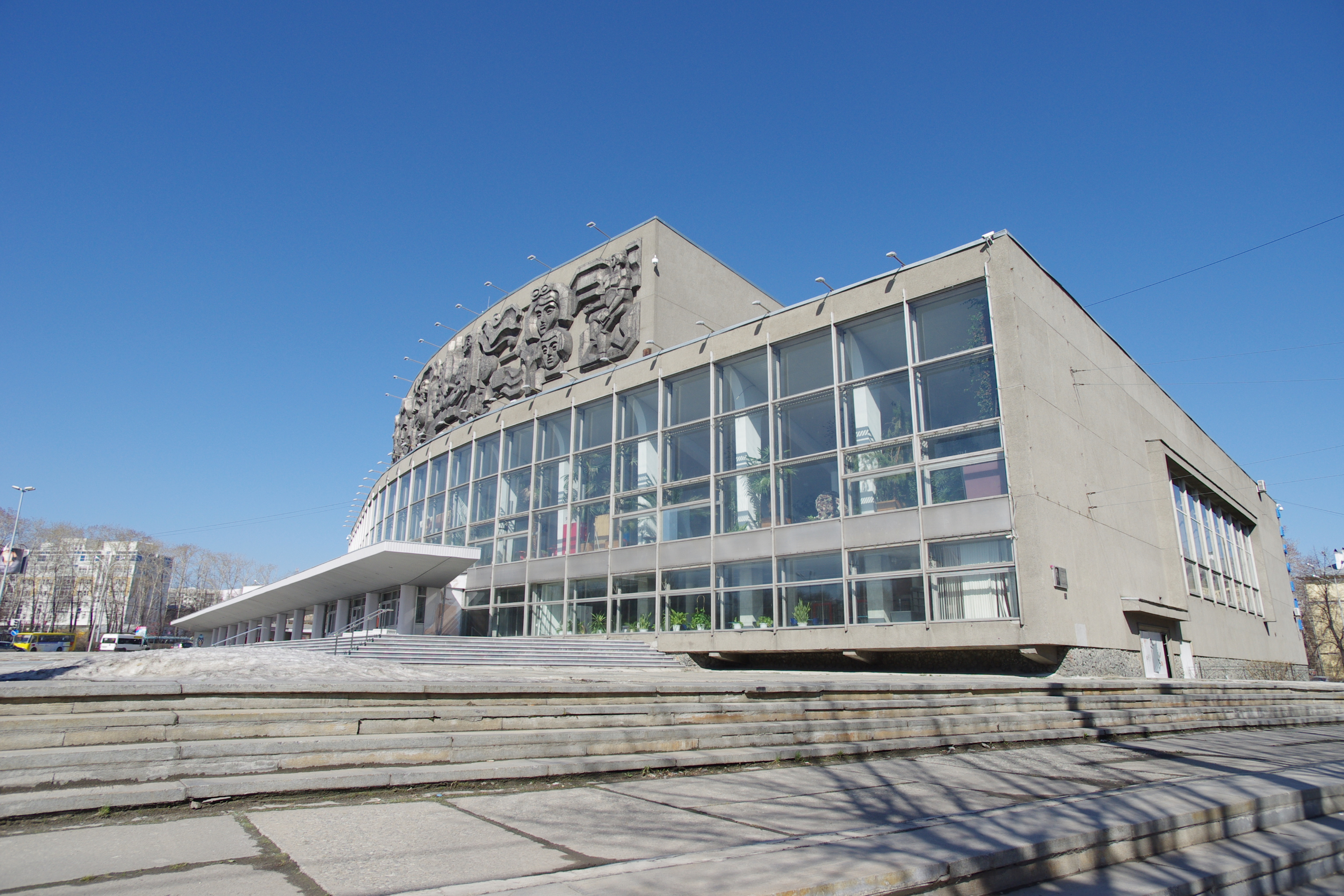
Yeltsin's campaign announcement was held in the Youth Palace

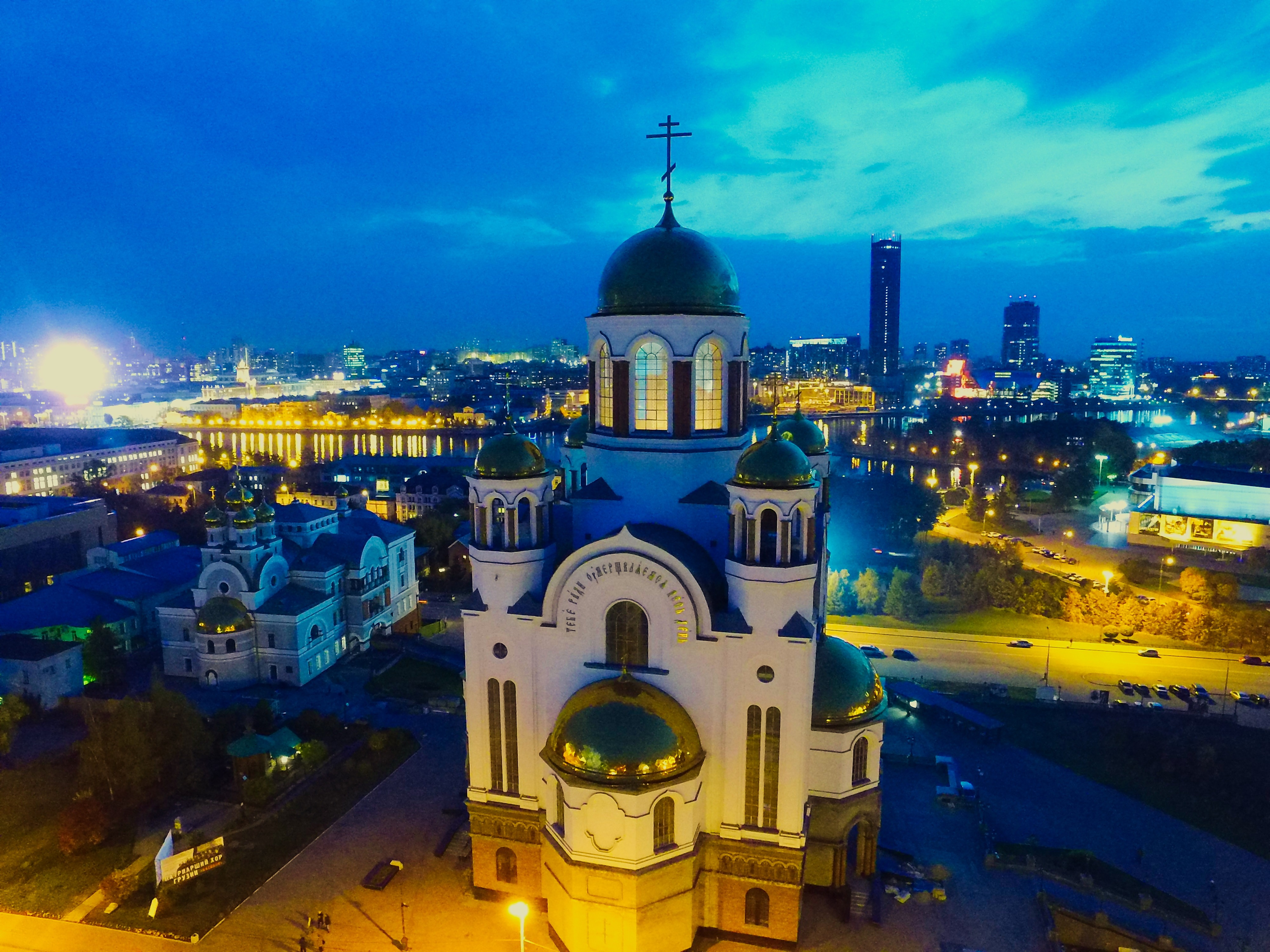
Yeltsin declared his candidacy in his native Yekaterinburg

On 15 February 1996, Yeltsin officially declared his intentions to seek a second term in a speech delivered at the Youth Palace in his native Yekaterinburg. While delivering his announcement, Yeltsin's voice was uncharacteristically hoarse.

Yeltsin's announcement tried to portray a stark contrast between himself and Zyuganov. In his announcement Yeltsin declared,

Russia is again at a crossroads. We cannot afford to repeat the tragic mistakes of 1917 and allow again a division of the country into Whites and Reds. On June 16 we will choose not only a president but our future life, the fate of Russia.

Yeltsin proclaimed in his speech, "the people want me to run a second time." Despite Yeltsin making this remark insisting that the Russian public desired to see him run for reelection, polling indicated immense disinterest in his candidacy. On the day that he announced his candidacy, the majority of major polls showed him to be either in fourth or fifth place. Most political observers had already disregarded his prospects. Polling showed him to possess an approval rating of 6%. The controversial diverse Joseph Stalin was found to be polling with a more favorable opinion by the Russian public, scoring both lower negatives and higher positives than Yeltsin. Polling also found that the majority of Russians believed that Yeltsin was to blame for wrecking the country's economy.

The campaign faced the challenge of convincing voters that despite bleak circumstances under his incumbency, Russia would fare better under Yeltsin's continued leadership.

Many observers saw Yeltsin as an unpopular underdog. There were some observers who believed that Yeltsin still could be able to utilize his reputable political instincts combined with the immense patronage and power belonging to the presidency in order to pull off an upset victory. However, most saw his prospects of winning a fair election as incredibly dim.

Yegor Gaidar was even quoted as saying, "No matter how you arrange the possible coalitions, it is hard to imagine that the president will win."

=== Winter 1996 ===
By the virtue of Yeltsin's incumbency, his campaign effort was given access to a plethora of resources that no other campaign had. This meant that the advantage of his incumbency immense. While he was, on one hand, burdened by the failures of his incumbency, he was also provided substantial utilities by virtue his position as the head of the Russian government. Yeltsin's campaign had access to the resources of agencies such as the FSB the FAPSI. Korzhakov's own analytic center and regional heads of administration who Korzhakov helped to appoint were willing to assist the campaign. The campaign used these resources for intelligence gathering and monitoring campaign spending, however they otherwise benefited only marginally from them. However, Yeltsin found other means of using his incumbency as a tool for his campaign. Being an incumbent, he could demonstrate his willingness to fulfill promises he was making on the campaign trail. In March he doubled a large number of pensions. This received flak from his opponents, who accused him of essentially buying votes, however, Yeltsin's team argued that he was simply doing his job as President. In early March, Yeltsin decreed that 40 million landowners in Russia would have the right to buy and sell property. This move made land a tradable commodity in Russia for the first time since 1917. Yeltsin hoped that this would benefit peasants and provide them a reason to embrace reforms, thus undermining their support for the communists.

On 15 March, the Communist Party, which constituted the largest faction in the State Duma, moved to pass a (largely symbolic) non-binding resolution denouncing the Dissolution of the Soviet Union. This played right into Yeltsin's hands. Allegedly, Yeltsin's aides had laid the groundwork for the vote by giving nationalists in the Duma the go-ahead to vote with the Communists and by coordinating the proceedings so that only Yeltsin's least popular allies in parliament speak out against the resolution. When it passed, Yeltsin attacked the Communists by alleging that if one is to claim that the Soviet breakup was illegal, then one is effectively arguing that Russia itself is an illegitimate state. This, seemingly inconsequential, vote now positioned Zyuganov as an apparent extremist. Polling ultimately showed that less than a third of Russian's approved of the resolution. The Communists proved unable to effectively respond to this development. Soon after this, Yeltsin's own poll numbers began to improve.

On 24 March, Chernomydrin announced that Our Home is Russia would back Yeltsin's candidacy. He also announced his intention to form a broad coalition of parties to back Yeltsin's campaign.

On 27 March 1996, Yeltsin benefited from International Monetary Fund director Michel Camdessus' approval of a $10.2 billion loan for Russia.

=== Spring 1996 ===
Throughout the Winter of 1996, Soskovets' strategy had been losing traction within Yelstin’s inner circle, and, at the start of Spring, the strategy was entirely abandoned when Yeltsin fired Soskovets as his campaign manager. As was detailed previously, new campaign leadership was added to the campaign, and a new strategy was adopted.

Yeltsin's candidacy was officially filed on 3 April. That same day, Democratic Russia leaders Lev Ponomaryov and Gleb Yakunin gave Yeltsin their personal endorsements, and encouraged members of their party to follow their lead.

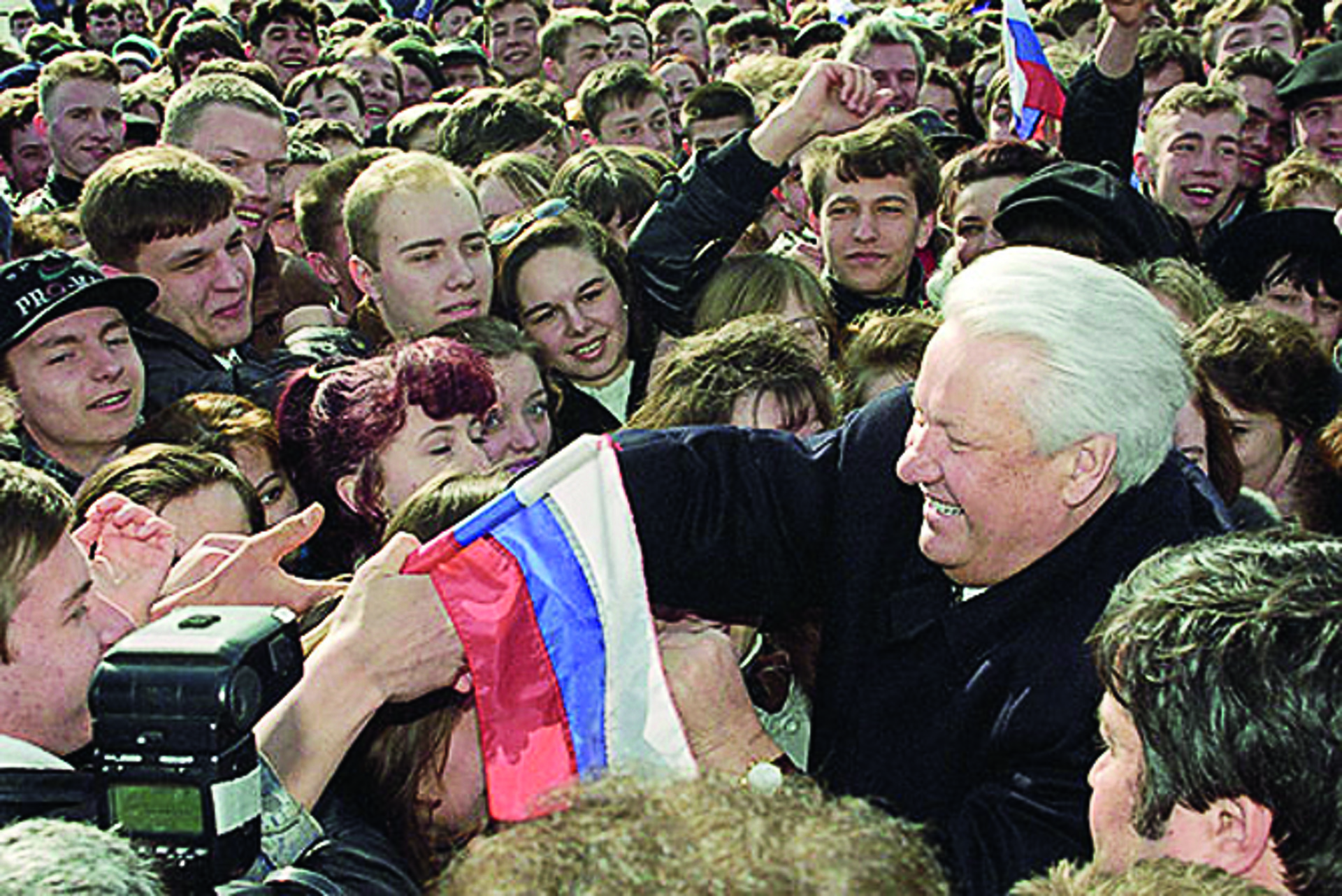
Boris Yeltsin at his campaign's first official rally on 4 April in Belgorod. Belgorod was seen as a communist stronghold. In the 1995 legislative election, 35% of its electorate had voted for the Communist Party in its party list vote, and they had elected in their single-district vote Nikolai Ryzhkov (Yeltsin's closest opponent in the 1991 presidential election).

Immediately after officially filing his candidacy, Yeltsin launched his first campaign tour. He decided to travel to southern Russia's agricultural region, home to the Red Belt (where the Communists were particularly strong). He began his travels with a trip to the city of Belgorod. On his visit, Yeltsin was greeted with an unexpectedly warm reception. Thereafter, the Yeltsin campaign staff arranged an exhaustive travel schedule for the president and Yelstin campaigned vigorously, maintaining a high media profile. Yeltsin traveled around the country and visited factories, met with voters, and faced hecklers. As an advantage of his incumbency, Yeltsin had the liberty of traveling on the presidential jet. In contrast, Zyuganov had to travel by commercial flights.

For his second campaign trip after being registered as a candidate Yeltsin traveled to Krasnodar on 16 April. In Krasnodar, Yeltsin announced new state handouts, promised veterans that he would increase their pension 125% within a month, pledged greater benefits for the Cossacks, declared building relations with the Commonwealth of Independent States to be Russia's most important foreign policy concern, and announced his intention to sign decrees stimulating the economic development of Krasnodar Krai and Russia's agro-industrial complex. Yeltsin also declared that Russia's Black Sea Fleet, partly based in Krasnodar Krai, to be a, "indispensable element of Russian strategic security."

Many of Yeltsin's early stump speeches had a forward-looking tone, promising a better future for all Russians, and seeking to reposition him as a unifying force in Russian politics. In an April speech Yeltsin said,

"We have ceased to see the world in terms of red and white. Before our eyes, it has become multicolored, vivid, and bright."

Yeltsin worked diligently to convince Russian voters that he would be able to make it to the second round of the election and defeat Zyuganov. He was publicly dismissive of suggestions that a third force might coalesce.

In April, for the first time, a number of polls were showing Yeltsin leading Zyuganov. Polls also showed that Yeltsin's support was higher amongst younger, urban, and higher-income Russians, while Zyuganov's support was higher amongst older, poorer, and rural voters. Polling showed signs that Yeltsin’s popularity had likely benefited somewhat from his recent announcement of plans to peacefully end the conflict in Chechnya. Yeltsin also was benefiting from the Communist Party running a relatively poor campaign. The Communists had been rather unsuccessful in their marketing of Zyuganov's candidacy, failing to create appealing messaging.

During the nation's Victory Day (9 May) Celebration, Yeltsin gave an address to crowds in Red Square from atop Lenin's Tomb. He praised the Russian people, Russian soldiers, and the Allies (unlike Zyuganov, who failed to acknowledge the allied forces in the speech he delivered across town). After delivering his speech, Yeltsin broke with tradition and became the first Russian leader in 51 years to leave Moscow during the Victory Day celebration. Following a brief meeting with veterans in Gorky Park, he flew to Volgograd (Stalingrad), the site of some of the fiercest fighting during the war. Yeltsin said that, although the Volgograd region had consistently voted Communist in past elections, he felt morally obligated to visit the site due to its importance. Upon arriving in Volgograd, Yeltsin was reportedly greeted by crowds carrying signs saying "We love you" and "Yeltsin is a democrat."

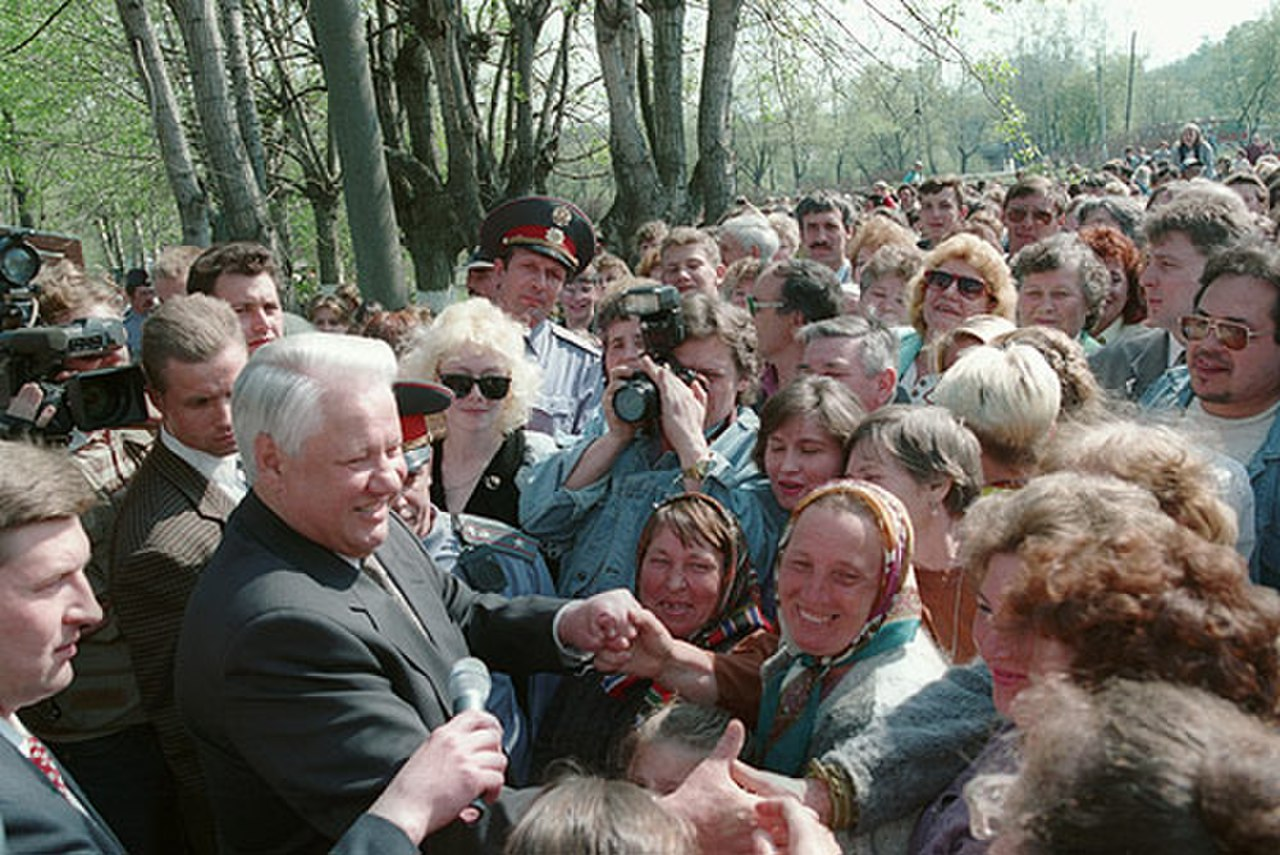
Yelstin campaigning on May 7

In early May, Yeltsin refused Zyuganov's challenge to hold a debate, saying,

I was a Communist for 30 years and had so much of that demagoguery that today, with my democratic views, I cannot bear this demagoguery any more...For this reason, I don't need the debate with Zyuganov. I stick to my beliefs, while he wants to drag the country backward.

He went on to say that he did not have time to debate all of the ten candidates, and it would not be fair to debate just one.

Over the Victory Day weekend, Yeltsin's campaign began a heavy advertising campaign. This was in violation of election laws, which mandated that candidates could not run television, billboard, or radio advertisements earlier than 15 May. The advertisements were created for the campaign by the Russian advertising firm Video International. The advertisements starred veterans, and were commissioned by the Igor Malashenko (who was in charge of the campaign's image management and television advertising) to serve as the first step of an effort to Yeltsin's image among older voters.

In May, Yeltsin's campaign saw a boost when The World Bank provided Russia a loan. Yeltsin's campaign got a boost from the announcement of a $10 billion loan to the Russian government from the International Monetary Fund. Yeltsin used trillions of rubles from the IMF loans to begin repaying government debt to state employees.

At the 17 May CIS Summit in Moscow, leaders of the other nations that formerly composed the Soviet Union offered their collective endorsement of Yeltsin's candidacy.

Yeltsin's campaign received a boost when, on 27 May, he and acting Chechen President Zelimkhan Yandarbiyev signed a cease-fire. Following the signing ceremony, Yeltsin boarded a plane and immediately embarked on a surprise six-hour trip to Chechnya, where he visited soldiers and declared victory. This fulfilled a promise that Yeltsin had made that he would personally visit war-torn Chechnya before the day of the election.

On 31 May, Yeltsin unveiled his official campaign platform in the city of Perm. The choice of location made headlines, as Perm was widely seen to favor the Communist Party. Perm was also thought to be especially unlikely to support Yeltsin because both the Liberal Democratic Party and the Communist Party had beaten pro-Yeltsin parties there months earlier in the 1995 legislative election. Yeltsin's campaign took a gamble by choosing to actively campaign in Perm, which ultimately paid-off when Yeltsin won the majority of its vote in the first round of the election, defeating Zyuganov by a wide-margin.

=== Summer 1996 ===
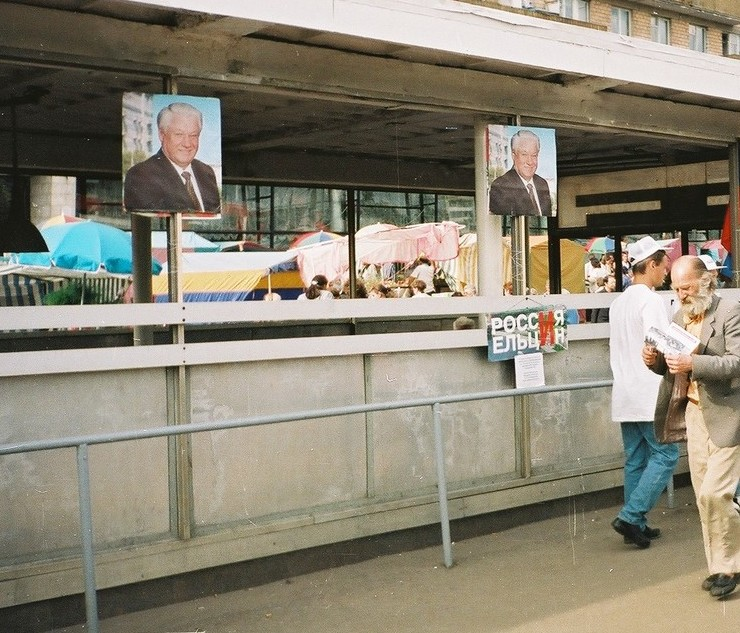
Campaign advertisements grace the Moscow Metro ahead of the June election

By the summer of 1996, all major polls showed Yeltsin making notable gains.

Back in April, Filatov sought for the campaign to avoid anti-Communist campaigning (as this risked providing Zyuganov free publicity). However, by June, he had revised his approach, and the campaign issued direct criticism of the Communist platform. Despite the decision to negatively campaign against the Communists, Yeltsin himself rarely made attacks on his opponents in his campaign speeches.

Near the end of the campaign, Dzhokhar Dudayev's widow endorsed Yeltsin for President of Russia. This further neutralized criticisms of his handling of the Chechen War.

The campaign held GOTV in the run up to the day of the election. This included organizing rock concerts aimed at increasing youth turnout. A June concert at Red Square drew 100,000 attendees. In cities such as Perm, concerts were held the weekend prior to the election.

=== Result of the first round ===
The government's decision to allow a wide election-day voting window (with polls open from 8 AM to 10 PM) was believed to allow for a greater voter turnout. Experts speculated that a stronger turnout would benefit Yeltsin's campaign.

Yeltsin confidently issued predictions that he would place first in the first-round. However, his campaign's leaders kept their cards fair closer to their chest. Ultimately, Yeltsin did win the first round, albeit by only 3 percentage points. In carrying 35% Yeltsin placed between five and ten points lower than public polling had predicted he would. However, he had placed relatively near the projections of the campaign's internal polling.

Many in Yeltsin's camp were actually happy that the result was close. They believed that a close margin would help motivate pro-reformist voters to participate in the second round of voting. They had feared a landslide first-round result in his favor would lead Yeltsin's supporters to be less motivated to vote in the second round.

Some viewed Yeltsin as benefiting from Russian voters in the 1996 election possessing a greater concern with choosing the candidate that championed the political and economic future that they preferred with Russia, rather than evaluating the incumbent's performance.

Yeltsin had also benefited from the inadequacy of his opponents' campaign efforts. Much of the opposition were mired with technical ineptness, ideological confusion, and political baggage. Many of his opponents had effectively self-sabotaged their candidacies, making it completely unnecessary for Yeltsin to concentrate any efforts on combatting their candidacies.

== Campaigning in the second round ==
After the results of the first round were announced, Yeltsin's campaign publicly expressed confidence that was that Yeltsin was going to win the next round, declaring their belief that most of Yavlinski, Zhirinovski, Lebed and Fyodorov's supporters were going to vote for Yeltsin in the second round. To emphasize this anticipated coalition of support, Yeltsin's campaign adopted the slogan "Now we are united!"

Two days after the first round of voting, Yeltsin hired Alexander Lebed as his national security advisor and, in return, received Lebed's endorsement. During the first round, Yeltsin had brokered a secretive arrangement in which Lebed had agreed to support him in the second round.

Entering the second round, the chief concerns of voters were the war in Chechnya, skyrocketing prices, unemployment, and economic decline. Voters also desired for whoever won the presidency to oversee timely control over the payment of pensions and salaries and achieve peace in Chechnya. Yeltsin's campaign aimed to convince voters that Yeltsin was successfully implementing measures to address all of these concerns. They also sought to convince the voters that Russia would not suffer a second Perestroika.

Early in the runoff, the campaign encountered major road bumps. Days after the first round the campaign had to handle controversy in the fallout of the Xerox Affair. Additionally, Yeltsin's health presented significant obstacle to the campaign.

In addition to firings related to the aforementioned Xerox Affair, there were a number of other shakeups in Yeltsin's presidential administration. Yeltsin fired Pavel Grachev, at the request of Lebed.

A week into the runoff campaign, Yeltsin fell ill upon returning from a campaign visit to Kaliningrad. Yeltsin himself publicly insisted it was merely a cold or sore throat. Despite their heavy efforts to cover-up Yeltsin's health problems, the campaign failed to entirely conceal from the public that the president's health had deteriorated significantly over the course of the campaign. Rumors variably alleged that Yeltsin was, in fact, suffering from exhaustion, a breakdown, or depression. Months after the election, it would be disclosed that he had, in fact, suffered a heart attack.

For a period of time after the heart attack, Yeltsin ceased making campaign appearance and disappeared from public view. To cover up Yeltsin's absence, Yeltsin's campaign team created a "virtual Yeltsin" shown in the media through staged interviews that never happened and pre-recorded radio addresses. He later returned to the campaign trail, however, with a drastically lighter travel itinerary than he had in the first round.

During the runoff campaign, one of the advertising agencies working for Yeltsin's campaign printed over a million adhesive-backed posters with Zyuganov's image on them and the warning, "This could be your last chance to buy food!" These posters appealed to a genuine fear of hunger amongst the Russian populace, and were plastered on the windows of food markets all across the country. This proved to be an effective scare tactic. Posters were printed by the campaign in the closing weeks which warned "The Communist Party hasn't changed its name and it won't change its methods". By evoking unpleasant memories of communist rule, the campaign hoped to spur turnout amongst anticommunist voters and weaken the coalition between nationalists and Communists.

Despite the tone of his campaign material, a little more than a week before Election Day, Yeltsin indicated a willingness to work with the Communists declaring that he was, "ready for dialogue and co-operation with all those for whom the fate of Russia is a top priority", including "honest Communists".

Near the close of the runoff campaign, Lebed became a burden to the campaign. Lebed made several incendiary remarks, which attracted controversy. On 26 June, just a week before the election. While addressing an assembly of Cossacks on behalf of the campaign, Lebed said particular Russian religious sects, including Mormons, were "mold and scum" which had been "artificially brought into our country with the purpose of perverting, corrupting, and ultimately breaking up our state". In these remarks Lebed said that such "foul sects", needed to be outlawed be outlawed because they posed "a direct threat to Russia's security". He argued that Russia needed "established, traditional religions", which he named as being Russian Orthodoxy, Islam and Buddhism (noticeably omitting Judaism from this list of acceptable religions).

On the day of the election, when Yeltsin made an appearance at a polling station in order to cast his own vote, he was described as appearing "shaky", drawing further concerns about his health.

=== Result of the second round ===
Yeltsin won the final round of the election by a decisive margin, managing to defeat Zyuganov by nearly ten million votes. On the night of the election, Zyuganov publicly conceded the race to Yeltsin, and congratulated him on his victory.

Yelstin was re-inaugurated as President the following month.

Yeltsin's reelection defied a pattern amongst post-Soviet transition democracies of nationalists unseating incumbent leaders during their immediate bids for reelection.

== Platform and positions ==
Yeltsin was generally seen as representing the status quo (as his reelection would effectively grant a continuation of his leadership and policies), whereas Zyuganov was seen as opposing the status quo. On some issues Yeltsin was seen as being to the right of Zyuganov, whilst on other issues he was perceived as being to the left of Zyuganov. Overall, however, Yeltsin was seen as a progressive or a liberal, while Zyuganov was seen as conservative. This primarily meant that Yeltsin was pro-reform and anti-communist, whilst Zyuganov was anti-reform and pro-communist. Yeltsin was characterized as a democrat, while Zyuganov was characterized as a nationalist.

Yelstin was viewed as bolstering the causes of centrists, whilst Zyuganov was viewed as representing the nationalists.

In early March 1996, Soskovets, still the de-juror chairman of the campaign, publicly outlined the themes of Yeltsin's campaign as being, social support, strengthening Russian statehood, fighting crime, and emphasizing how government activities were promoting stability.

On 6 April 1996, Yeltsin addressed a congress of his supporters. He announced that he would delay unveiling his campaign platform, until following month, claiming this was to prevent his opponents from "distorting or using" his program. However, Yeltsin did provide a very general overview of what his program might entail. He spoke on the themes of the family, fighting crime, ending the war in Chechnya, and strengthening CIS integration. Yeltsin promised that he would win so that "these elections will not be the last."

On 31 May 1996, Yeltsin announced his official campaign program at an event in the city of Perm. The platform was detailed in a 127-page document entitled Russia: Individual, Family, Society, State.

His platform echoed much of his 1991 platform's rhetoric. It made promises to complete economic reform, to rewrite the tax code, compensate swindled investors, strengthen Russia's social welfare system and turn the nation's army into a modern professional fighting-force.

In his platform, Yeltsin claimed to have pulled Russia back from the brink of catastrophe, bringing it toward a more definitive future. He took credit himself for overseeing the development of a multi-party democracy and the foundations of a liberal-market economy. He also credited himself for keeping Russia's territorial integrity intact, and reintegrating Russia with the world.

In his platform, Yeltsin wrote,

As president I know better than most how difficult life is for you at the moment. I feel all your pain, all the country's pain. However, I am sure that this is the pain of a recovering organism.

=== Economic policy ===
Yeltsin promised to complete his economic reform, insisting that the reforms that had already been initiated should be carried-through. However, in an effort to boost his popularity, Yelstin promised to abandon some of his more unpopular economic reform measures. Yeltsin's enthusiasm for reform was markedly different than it had been in the early years of his presidency. Yeltsin now championed a more cautious and gradual approach to reform.

Yeltsin also promised to rewrite the tax code and to compensate swindled investors.

In late January 1996 and early February 1996, Yeltsin made promises to spend billions of dollars in support of coal miners in order to end workers strikes. This was the first of many populist spending promises Yeltsin would make during his campaign.

Yelstin promised to pay wages and pension arrears and to raise pensions. In March, to demonstrate a willingness to deliver on his promises, Yeltsin doubled many pensions.

Yeltsin promised easier loans to buy homes.

Yeltsin promised to provide compensation to those that had lost their savings through the hyper-inflation of 1991-92. Such payments would be distributed in a manner prioritizing war veterans, the disabled, and elderly.

Yeltsin promised farmers that he would cut their electricity expenses in half and would forgive nearly 23 trillion rubles in farm debt.

=== Military ===
Yeltsin promised to turn the nation's army into a modern professional fighting force. Yeltsin adopted a position favoring the abolition of conscription, proposing a gradual end to the policy to be completed by the year 2000.

Yeltsin believed that Russia needed to ensure its military security, spite a decrease in world tensions. He condemned NATO expansion saying that the West was trying to '"reinforce its world leadership." Yeltsin also called for military reform to adjust to the new strategic situation, arguing that instead of hundreds of divisions that exist only on paper, Russia's military needed, "a few dozen divisions made up of entirely professionals."

Yeltsin pledged to spend 2.8 trillion rubles on for research and development for defense sector.

Yeltsin called for adopting a strong nuclear deterrent policy.

==== Ending the Chechen War ====
Yeltsin attempted to separate himself from taking responsibility for the unpopular military action in Chechnya, instead contending that his ministers should be the ones blamed.

Yeltsin pledged to end the war in Chechnya. He also promised to spend trillions of rubles rebuilding the war-torn region. During his campaign, Yeltsin falsely claimed that he was already achieving a peaceful end to the conflict. He even went as far as erroneously denying reports that armed conflict was actively ongoing. Yeltsin saw his candidacy as tilting upon the public's perception of his ability to deliver a peaceful to the conflict.

On 31 March 1996, in a televised speech to the nation, Yeltsin announced his long-awaited peace initiative for Chechnya. He conceded that his administration would be willing to hold discussions with Chechen leader Dzhokhar Dudayev, and would be willing to discuss some form of autonomy for Chechnya within the Russian Federation short of outright independence, perhaps modeled upon Tatarstan. He named Prime Minister Chernomyrdin, who was more favorably viewed by Chechens, as heading these efforts. He announced that troops would be withdrawn from areas already secured. He also announced amnesty would be granted to most Chechen fighters. However, in a deft political move, Yeltsin declared that the decisions as to which Chechens would be granted amnesty would be decided by the State Duma, which was controlled by the Communist Party.

On 27 May 1996, Yeltsin's efforts received a boost when he and acting Chechen President Zelimkhan Yandarbiyev signed a cease-fire agreement. This temporarily suspended military operations in the Chechen Republic.

=== Social policy ===
==== Welfare ====
Yeltsin promised to increase welfare spending and strengthen the nation's social welfare system.

Yeltsin promised to provide free transportation to the elderly. He also promised a significant increase in the amount of money given in monthly pensions.

Yelstin promised that, for frozen regions of Northern Russia, he would subsidize children's holidays and build retirement homes in the south for their miners.

Yeltsin promised to provide students with scholarships for science students, and better pension plans for teachers.

=== Soviet reunification ===
Yeltsin made efforts to one-up the nationalists and communists on the issue of Soviet reunification by taking concrete actions. Yeltsin announced a series of agreements with states of the former Soviet Union pertaining to voluntary reunification.

On 2 April 1996, Yeltsin and president Alexander Lukashenko of Belarus signed a treaty calling for further cooperation between the two nations. The treaty would establish a Union State. It would also establish a "Community of Sovereign Republics" that would include supranational bodies for the military, environmental, and technical fields. A common currency was envisioned by 1997, to be followed by a joint budget and constitution afterwards. However, the nations would keep their own flags and continue to be sovereign states.

== Image management ==
Within the campaign council, Malashenko was tasked with managing television advertising and enhancing the president's image. Additionally involved in shaping Yeltsin's image was Georgy Rogozin, who was given offices on the eighth floor of the President-Hotel.

The campaign council hired the country's leading campaign advisers, image consultants and advertising agencies. Igor Mintusev and Yekaterina Yegerova of the campaign consulting firm Nikola M were both hired to work on Yeltsin's image. The campaign also employed a number of media consultants, who were tasked with placing favorable articles in national and regional publications.

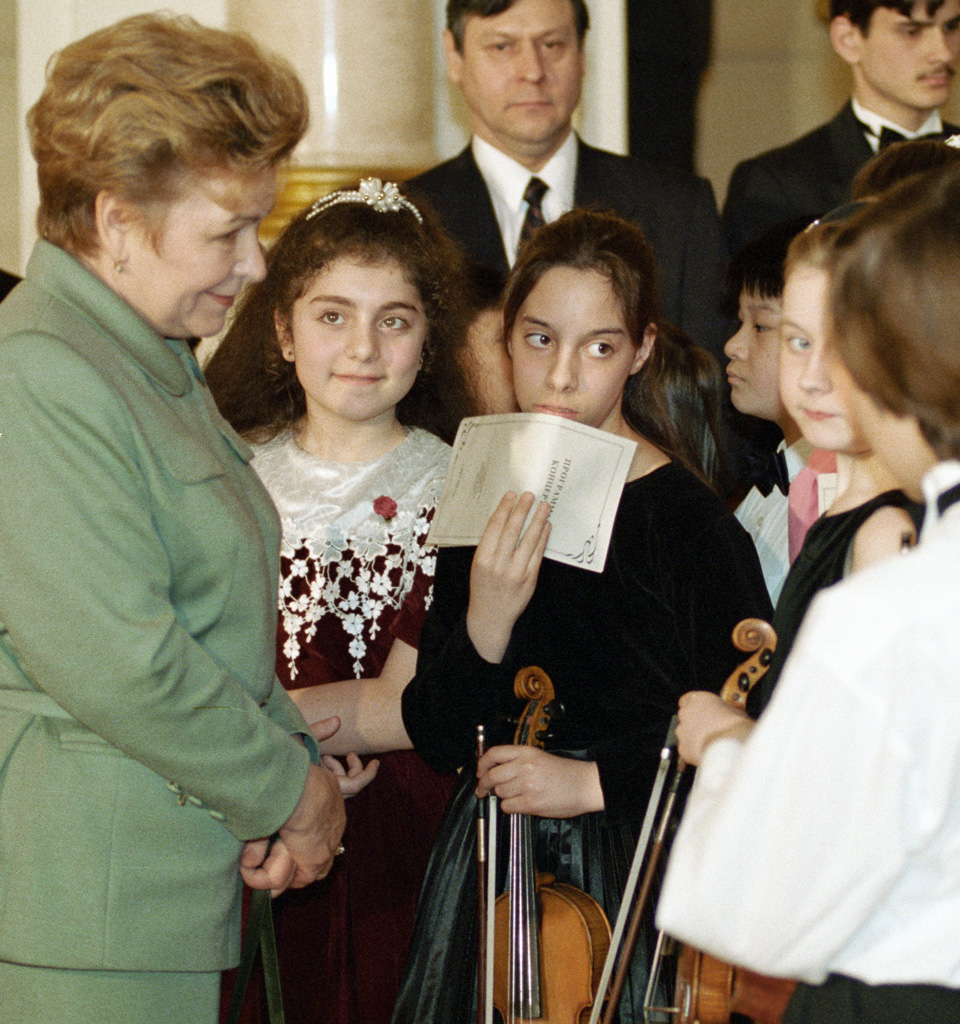
Normally a private individual, Naina Yeltsina (left) made herself more available to the public

To boost his image as a reformer, and to downplay the visibility of his reliance om his secretive team of Kremlin advisors (which played negatively with the public), Yeltsin strategically made campaign appearances alongside notable political figures from outside of his inner-circle. These included Luzhkov and Boris Gromov.

During the campaign, Yeltsin's wife, Naina Yeltsina, normally a private individual, took a more public role, and met with the voters.

The campaign made use of a number of catch-phrases, including "chose or lose" and "vote with your heart".

=== Personal health of Yeltsin ===
At 65 years old, Yeltsin's health had been in grave decline, with his infamously heavy consumption of alcohol being a contributing factor. By the time he had announced his reelection effort, Yeltsin was facing significant health problems. He was recovering from a series of heart attacks. In 1995 alone, Yeltsin had suffered three heart attacks.

Yeltsin campaigned energetically during the first round of the election in an effort to dispel concerns about his health. Nonetheless, it was visible at times that his health was indeed declining while he was on the campaign trail. For the benefit of his health while campaigning, Yeltsin temporarily gave up his heavy drinking.

Yeltsin's campaign worked to conceal his ailing health from the public.

=== Media ===
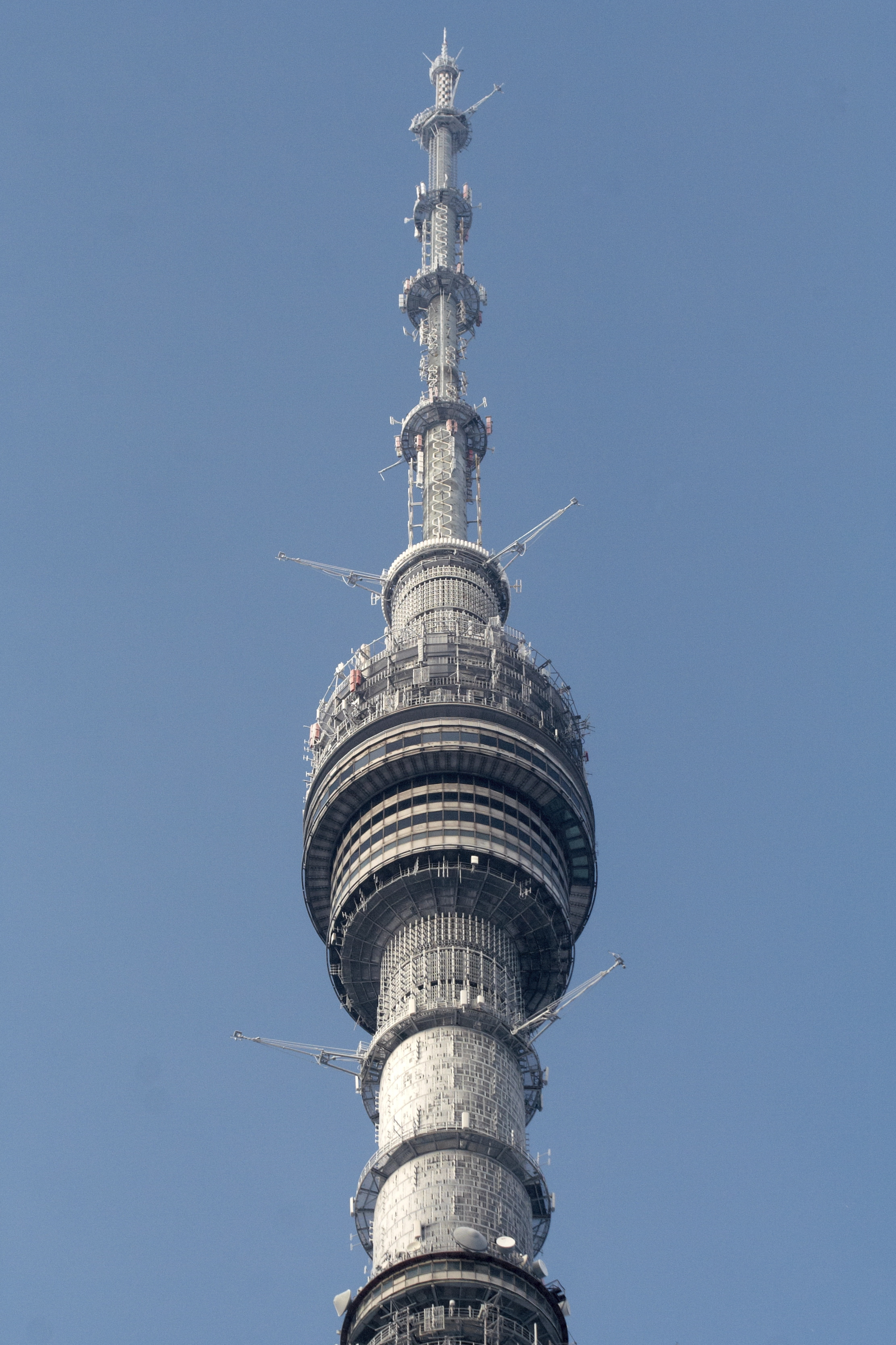
A television tower in Moscow

Yeltsin's campaign organized the most sophisticated media effort that Russia had ever seen. While the Communist campaign relied on old-school techniques, such as campaign rallies and leafletting, Yeltsin's team commissioned firms to conduct focus-group research, polling, consulting, and direct mail advertising on behalf of campaign.

Throughout the first round of the election, Yeltsin maintained a high level of media presence. His approval benefited from this. Additionally, his wife made herself available for interviews with the media.

In March 1996, NTV general director Igor Malashenko was made a member of Yeltsin's newly-established campaign council. Within the campaign council, Malashenko was tasked with managing television advertising and enhancing the president's image. Malashenko commissioned Video International, the same firm that supplied NTV with most of its advertising and television programming, to produce television sports, posters and leaflets for the campaign. He awarded additional contracts for direct mail and posters to Mikhail Semenov, who owned Russia's largest direct mail firm.

Rather than asking voters whether they were better off under his leadership, Yeltsin's campaign sought to ask voters whether they believed that they would be better or worse off under Zyuganov's leadership.

==== Favorable media bias ====
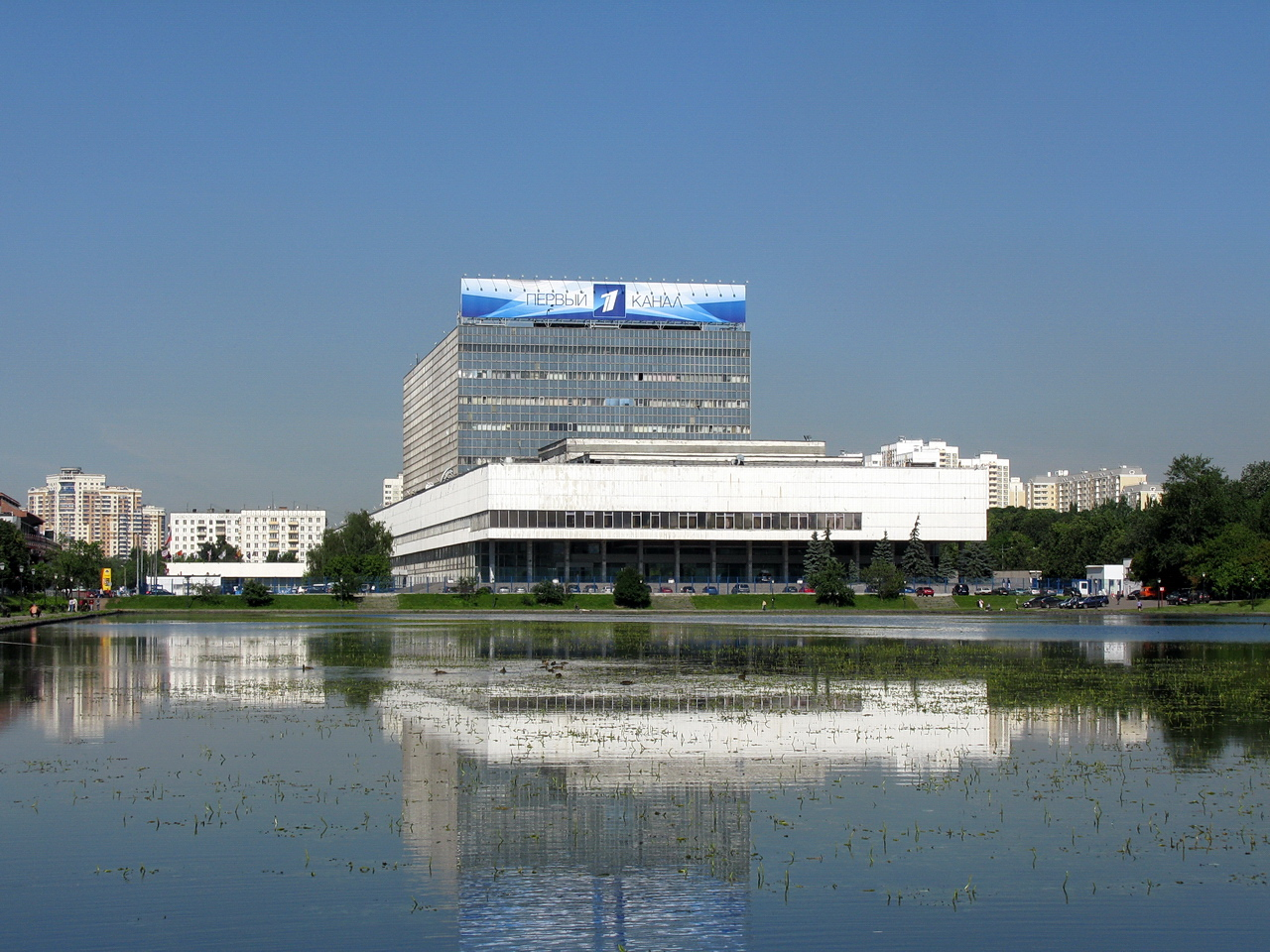
Ostankino Technical Center

The Yeltsin campaign successfully enlisted the national television channels (ORT, RTR, NTV) and most of the written press as agents in his campaign against Zyuganov.

Supplementing the work of the numerous public relations and media firms that were hired by the campaign, a number of media outlets "volunteered" their services to Yeltsin's reelection effort. For instance, Kommersant (one of the most prominent business newspapers in the country) published an anti-communist paper called Ne Dai Bog (meaning, "God forbid"). At ORT, a special committee was placed in charge of planning a marathon of anticommunist films and documentaries to be broadcast on the channel ahead of the election.

At the time of the 1991 presidential election, there had been two major television channels. RTR had supported Yeltsin, while ORT had criticized him and covered the views of a large number of his opponents. In the 1996 election, however, no major television network was critical of Yeltsin. The networks marginalized all of Yeltsin's opponents aside from Zyuganov, helping to create the perception that there were only two viable candidates. This allowed Yeltsin to pose as the lesser-evil. Near the end of the election, however, the networks began also providing coverage to the candidacy of Lebed, who had already agreed to support Yeltsin in the second round.

The European Institute for Media found that Yeltsin received 53% of all media coverage of the campaign, while Zyuganov received only 18%. In their evaluation of the biases of news stories, EIM awarded each candidate 1 point for every positive story they received and subtracted a point for every negative story they received. In the first round of the election, Yeltsin scored +492 and Zyuganov scored -313. In the second round of the election, Yeltsin scored +247 and Zyuganov scored -240.

One of the reasons for the media's overwhelming favoritism of Yeltsin was their fear that a Communist government would dismantle Russia's right to a free press. Another factor contributing to the media's support of Yeltsin was that his government still owned two of the national television channels, and still provided the majority of funding to the majority of independent newspapers. In addition, Yeltsin's government also was in charge of supplying licenses to media outlets. Yeltsin's government and Luzhkov, mayor of Moscow, flexed their power and reminded the owners, publishers, and editors that newspaper licenses and Moscow leases for facilities were "under review".

There were instances of direct payments made for positive coverage (so-called "dollar journalism").

Before his campaign, All-Russia State Television and Radio Broadcasting Company (RTR), the state television company, had reported critically on Yeltsin's policy in Chechnya. The day before he announced his candidacy, in a move some observers believed was an attempt to intimidate the media, Yeltsin accused Russia's state television and radio of peddling "a batch of lies" in its news reports and fired RTR's chief, Oleg Poptsov. Yeltsin replaced him with Eduard Sagalaev.

Additionally, Yeltsin managed to enlist Russia's emerging business elite in his campaign, including those who ran media corporations. This included Vladimir Gusinsky, owner of Most Bank, Independent Television and NTV. NTV which had, prior to the campaign, been critical towards Yeltsin's actions in Chechnya, changed the tone of their coverage. Igor Malashenko, Gusinsky's appointed head of NTV, even joined the Yeltsin campaign and led its media relations in a rather visible conflict-of-interest. In early 1996, Gusinsky and his political rival Boris Berezovsky (chairman of the Board of ORT) decided that they would put aside their differences in order to work together to support the reelection Boris Yeltsin.

In mid-1996, Chubais and Yeltsin recruited a team of a handful of financial and media oligarchs to bankroll the Yeltsin campaign and guarantee favorable media coverage the president on national television and in leading newspapers. In return, Chubais allowed well-connected Russian business leaders to acquire majority stakes in some of Russia's most valuable state-owned assets. Led by the efforts of Mikhail Lesin, the media painted a picture of a fateful choice for Russia, between Yeltsin and a "return to totalitarianism." The oligarchs even played up the threat of civil war if a Communist were elected president.

While the anti-Communist pro-Yeltsin media bias certainly contributed to Yeltsin's victory, it was not the sole factor. In only the past few years, Russia had seen election results where the prevailing party had won despite facing strong media bias against them, like Zyuganov did in 1996. For instance, a similarly anti-Communist media bias in the run-up to the 1995 parliamentary elections had failed to prevent a Communist victory. Additionally, Yeltsin himself had been able to win the 1991 presidential election despite a strongly unfavorable media bias towards him ahead of that election.

=== Advertising ===
Early advertising for the campaign sought to portray Yeltsin as a "president for all". Early billboards of the campaign included slogans such as "Yeltsin is our president" and "Yeltsin is president of all Russia".

One particularly American-style campaign tactic that Yeltsin adopted was the use of direct mail letters.

==== Television commercials ====
Before the election, it was originally predicted that Yeltsin's television advertisements would likely resemble those that had been run by Our Home Is Russia in the week prior to the 1995 legislative elections. One such advertisement that had been run by Our Home Is Russia in 1995 featured a man on the street interview of voters, with respondents either replying Our Home Is Russia or the Communist Party. Those supporting the Communist Party were shown to be far more slovenly than those supporting Our Home Is Russia. This particular ad had conveyed an image of a close two-party race (in spite of reality being that Russia's political landscape was then a multi-party system) in order to urge voter turnout. This type of advertisement was seen as having the advantage of scaring voters into supporting Yeltsin as the lesser-evil, and encouraging turnout by portraying a razor-thin race. However, it was also seen as having the disadvantage of reminding the voters that they could vote for Zyuganov if they wished to see Yeltsin removed from office, essentially providing free advertising to the Zyuganov campaign.

Yeltsin's television campaign mainly focused on repairing his own image, rather than issuing attack ads on Zyuganov. The challenge his campaign faced was that, due to Yeltsin's negative ratings and overexposure on television, it was believed he could not effectively deliver his campaign pitch himself. Instead, the pitch would need to be delivered indirectly. This meant that advertisements would not feature Yeltsin himself. A barrage of advertisements were released which featured working-class Russians, veterans, and elderly people providing testimonials in support of Yeltsin's leadership. The groups that were portrayed in these ads were demographics which typically voted for the Communist Party. Therefore, these ads aimed these testimonials towards peeling-away voters from demographics that typically leaned communist.

Yeltsin's television advertising campaign avoided addressing difficult issues, such as the faltering economy. Mikhail Margelov, the head of Video International, said,

We didn't want political or economic discussions. We decided to play on the field of basic human values ... people talking about their lives and basic values. If we came to a discussion of economic problems or crime, it's easy to criticize Yeltsin for that.

Russian law prevented candidates from running advertisements before 15 March 1996. However, despite this regulation, the Yeltsin campaign began broadcasting a set of campaign commercials under the guise of "public service announcements" earlier than was permitted. The Russian airwaves were flooded on Victory Day with videos in which World War II veterans recalled their service and hinted at an ominous future under communist leadership. In one such video, a veteran remarked, "I just want my children and grandchildren to finally savor the fruits of the victory we fought for."

== Finances ==
Election laws specified that campaigns could spend up to $2.9 million. The campaign claimed that its official expenditures were $3 million. This amount does not accurately reflect the amount that was spent towards his campaign in both "unofficial" expenditures and outside expenditures. Estimates of the cost of Yeltsin's campaign extended into the hundreds of millions of dollars.

Yeltsin had run continuous television advertisements that were purchased at $15,000-$30,000 per minute. He employed a large campaign staff, traveled extensively, and distributed enormous amounts of high-quality campaign material.

Yeltsin's campaign was able to exceed spending limits, in part, by spending money through support groups separate from the official campaign organization. This took advantage of a loophole in which such groups were outside of the legal provisions relating to campaign spending limits.

Additionally, Yeltsin's government found it necessary to force the Central Bank to provide it an extra $1 billion in order to begin to deliver on his campaign promises before the day of the election

=== Support from business community ===
Yeltsin's campaign received immense financial backing from the business community. An advantage of incumbency that the campaign benefited from was Yeltsin's ties to Oligarchs. Oligarchs gave significant funding to Yeltsin's campaign. Oligarchs that had benefited under his leadership felt obliged to support him in order to secure their own positions. Oligarchs believed that a communist victory would be devastating for them. Among the oligarchs supporting Yeltsin were seven that subsequently were dubbed "Semibankirschina".

Yeltsin received the backing of business people who were fearful of a communist victory. For instance, Yeltsin saw the support of oil executives such as Vagit Alekperov (head of Lukoil) and Rem Vyakhirev (head of Gazprom) who were fearful of nationalization of oil under a Zyuganov presidency. Oligarchs and businesses provided the campaign an amount that was estimated to be between $100 million and $500 million. However, as mentioned earlier, the official spending that the campaign reported was a mere $3 million.

Following the election a financial fraud investigation arose from the Xerox Affair.

==== Loans for shares scheme ====
With the election approaching, strengthening support from Russia's new private business elite was believed to be critical to Yeltsin's reelection effort. Beginning in 1995, Yeltsin's government began to use a loans for shares scheme in privatizing state-owned shares in companies. The auctions were rigged, being non-competitive and frequently controlled by favored insiders with political connections. The scheme was structured in a manner that made Yeltsin's victory a strong interest of the investors involved. The two-stage program was structured so that the loans would be made before the election, but the auction of the shares could only take place beginning after the election, making it of financial concern for them that Yeltsin would win the election.

==== Low-cost bonds scheme ====
David E. Hoffman of The Washington Post reported that, during the election effort, Russian oligarchs profited from special deals involving low-cost government bonds. This, consequentially, sweetened the business community's support of Yeltsin's reelection effort.

== Campaign organizations ==
=== Central campaign ===
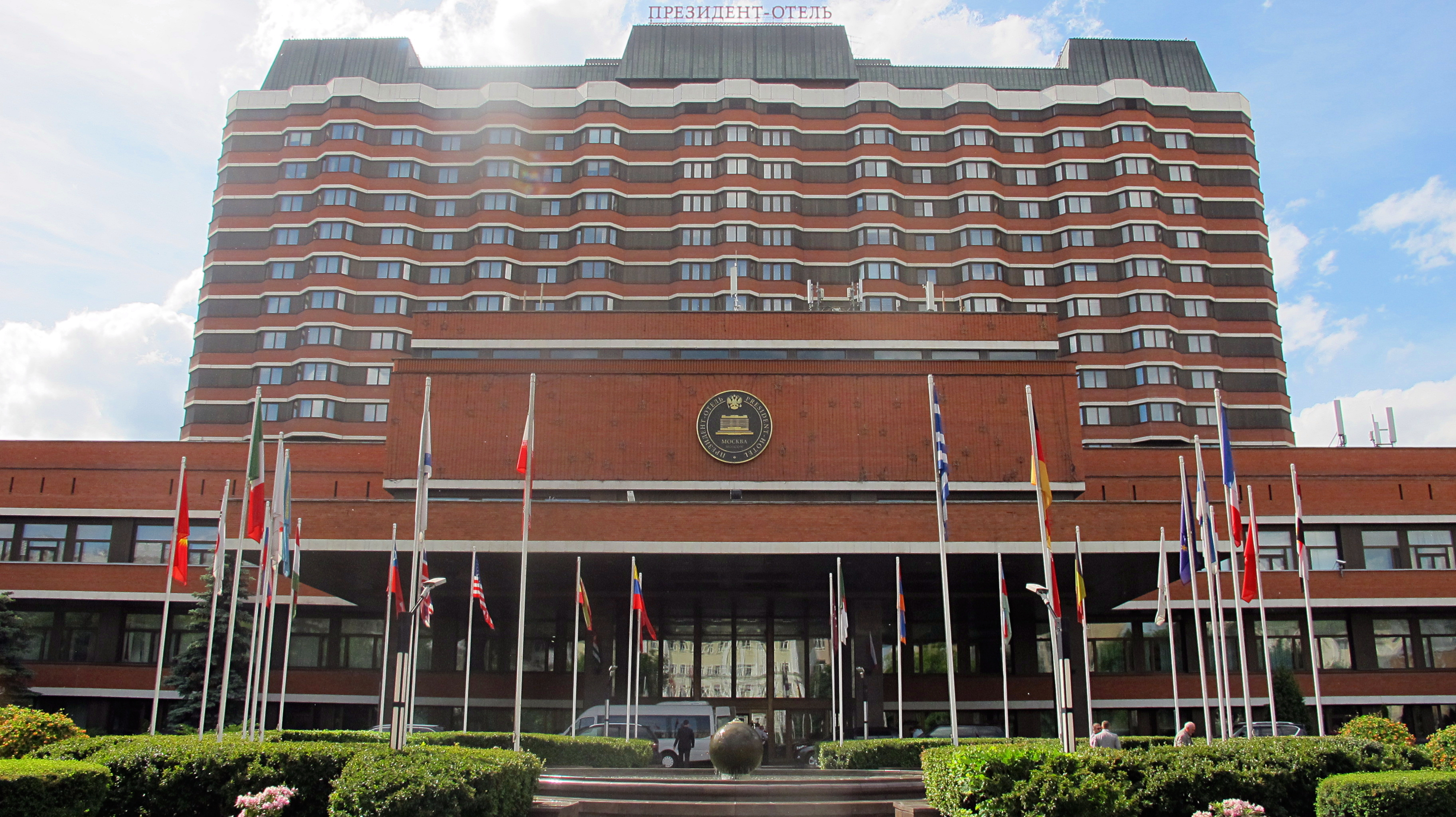
The campaign's headquarters were in Moscow’s President-Hotel

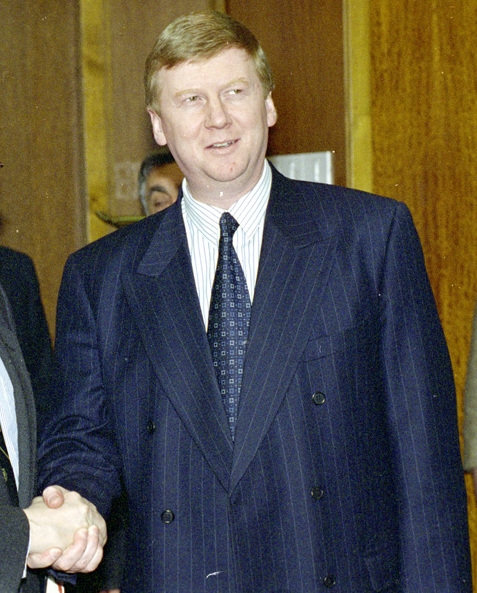
Chubais, who became the head of the campaign

Oleg Soskovets served as the campaign's original chairman. When it was first launched, the campaign's structure consisted solely of a campaign management team led by Soskovets. The management team had set-up shop at the campaign's headquarters on the ninth level of the President-Hotel in Moscow.

Yeltsin ultimately fired Soskovets as his campaign chairman on 23 March 1996, and hired Chubais to lead the campaign in his place. This represented a key change in the ideological slant of the campaign leadership. While Soskovets was a nationalist hardliner, Chubais was an avid reformer.

Additionally, on 19 March 1996, Yeltsin had established new "campaign council" to lead the campaign. Notably, this campaign council featured a number of liberals, in contrast to the nationalist hardliners that had been appointed to the initial campaign management team. Among those that Yeltsin appointed to the newly-formed campaign council was Viktor Ilyushin, one of the Kremlin insiders who urged him to abandon Skoskovets' campaign strategy. Additionally, after firing Soskovets as the head of his campaign, Yeltsin invited a number of shadow campaign groups to merge their operations with his official campaign effort. In doing so, Yeltsin handed-over much of the many responsibilities of the campaign to these groups.

After integrating various organizations that had been supporting his candidacy, the structure of the central campaign lacked cohesion. Additionally, after the initial creation of the campaign council, the campaign briefly acquired complicated leadership arrangement. Yeltsin had not dissolved the original Soskovets campaign management team. While its leadership had joined the campaign council, they also continued to work independently and maintained offices on a separate floor from the rest of the campaign council members. Between both the campaign council and the original management team (which had not been dissolved), the campaign had acquired two competing leadership groups. However, the campaign council quickly emerged as leaders, and ultimately negated the authority of the management team. Consequentially, with the campaign council's leadership, liberals were in charge of a campaign that (under its original management team) had previously been run by nationalist-leaning hardliners.

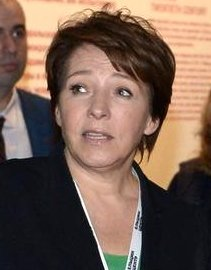
Yeltsin's daughter Tatyana Dyachenko was a key figure, serving as the de facto co-head of the campaign

While Chubais was the official head of the campaign, being named both Yeltsin's campaign manager and chairman of campaign council, he managed the campaign largely in tandem with Dyachenko, who was the de facto co-head of the campaign. Dyachenko coordinated much of the campaign from her Motorola cell phone. Dyachenko used her phone very frequently to remain in constant contact with both her father and with members of the campaign operations. She served as the primary conduit of communication between Yeltsin and his campaign operation.

Yury Yarov served as the campaign's executive head.

Also involved in the central campaign was Georgy Rogozin, who was in charge of security, as well as some image-management. Rogozin was given offices on the eighth floor of the President-Hotel. Dyachenko also recruited her associate Viktoriya Mitina to work for the campaign.

==== Members of the campaign council ====
- Mikhail Barsukov -fired after Xerox Affair
- Viktor Chernomyrdin
- Anatoly Chubais chairman
- Tatyana Dyachenko
- Viktor Ilyushin
- Alexander Korzhakov -fired after Xerox Affair
- Yury Luzhkov
- Igor Malashenko
- Sergei Shakhrai
- Yury Yarov
- Nikolai Yegorov

Ilyushin oversaw the overall campaign operations. He exerted strategic control over the campaign. Dyachenko was in charge of personal contact between Yeltsin and the campaign. Chubais was in charge of the campaign's finances. Chernomyrdin was in charge of financial policy. Malechenko was responsible for media relations. Luzkhov led the campaign efforts within the city of Moscow.

==== Analytical group ====
On 19 March 1996, simultaneously to forming the campaign council, Yeltsin also impaneled an "analytical group" to be led by Chubais. The organization enlisted the work of Dyachenko, Malashenko, Illyushin and Saratov as well as Valentin Yumashev, pollster Aleksandr Oslon, Vasily Shakhnovsky (chief of staff to Moscow's Mayor Luzhkov), Media-Most executive Sergei Zverev, and Duma deputy (and former deputy premier) Sergei Shakhrai.

==== Foreign consultants ====
Flush with money, the central campaign hired an extensive number of contractors for its campaign efforts. Most major research groups, think tanks, and public relations firms in Russia, at one point, worked for the campaign. However, with Russians being relatively new to electoral politics, the campaign also solicited the advice of private consults from abroad. Among those advising the campaign was Tim Bell, a British political strategist that had helped shape the public-image of former British prime minister Margaret Thatcher.

===== Team of American consultants =====
A team of American political consultants consisting of George Gorton, Joe Shumate, and Richard Dresner advised the campaign. They all had notable experience in American political campaigns. Gorton had just recently worked on Pete Wilson's failed US presidential campaign and Dresner had previously worked on a gubernatorial campaign of Bill Clinton's.

The three American consultants were hired in February 1996 by Soskovets, who hired them through a San Francisco firm with connections in Moscow. They were reportedly paid $250,000 for their consultation. Formally, their role was as advisors to the Yeltsin family. The team was given an unlimited budget with which to conduct focus groups and research.

By this time, it was not unusual for experienced American consultants to be recruited to Russian campaigns. In fact, during Yeltsin's 1991 presidential campaign, the Democratic Russia-run national initiative group supporting his candidacy had held a two-day series of meetings in which they solicited advice from a team of five American consultants. Despite the fact that it was not unusual, Yeltsin's team did not want to risk allowing Zyuganov to exploit the presence of foreign consults in the Yeltsin campaign as a means to lodge xenophobia-laden attacks on Yeltsin. They especially worried that the optics created by the involvement of foreign consultants might play negatively amid the particularly nationalist tone of the 1996 election. To avoid such optics, the team of American consultants were kept isolated from the rest of the campaign, and remained a secret until after the election was over. They never met with Yeltsin himself, but instead sent detailed and unsigned memos to Dyachenko, with whom they worked closely. They worked out of two suites on the eleventh floor of the President-Hotel, directly across the hall from Dyachenko's office. To hide their involvement, the group claimed to be American businessmen conducting consumer research.

Much of their advice proved to be obvious and redundant, however. Dyachenko, for instance, reported that none of their contributions were central to the campaign's planning or strategy. They had no apparent communications with campaign leaders such as Chubais and Malashenko. Because the consultants had been hired by Soskovets, many of those leading the campaign distrusted and disregarded them. Aleksandr Oslon commented on the role of the American advisors, stating, "when all the real decisions were made, they were not present." Despite all of this, the three consultants subsequently claimed to have played a critical role in the campaign, which has been refuted by others in the campaign. The consultants, most notably, boasted about what they purported was their critical in role in the success of campaign in a Time magazine cover-story which hyperbolically proclaimed, "Yanks to the Rescue".

=== National campaign structure ===
Outside of its central leadership, the campaign consisted of two parallel structures. One was its formal national campaign organization, the second was an organization composed of outside groups.

==== Formal national campaign organization ====
The formal nationwide campaign was largely overseen by Yarov, also a member of the campaign council. Yarov was responsible for the national campaign's official organizational work. Under his guidance, the campaign employed local representatives all across Russia. The local representatives were typically individuals who served in local governments.

Shakhrai, also a member of the campaign council, assumed a role of coordinating with regional leaders. This was similar to a role that Yegorov occupied on the campaign management team.

==== All-Russian Movement for Social Support for the President (ODOPP) ====
The All-Russian Movement for Social Support for the President (also known as the ODOPP) was an organization of Yeltsin's campaign which collaborated with outside groups providing their support to his candidacy. This formed the second nationwide structure of the campaign. The ODOPP and Chubais' campaign council jointly served as the main drivers of Yeltsin's campaign effort.

Originally, Boris Yeltsin saw support from several political leaders and organizations who each declared themselves to be his candidacy's primary nongovernmental sponsor. Vladimir Shumeyko announced that his social organization/quasi political party Reform's New Course would spearhead Yeltsin's reelection effort. Around the same time, the leaders of Our Home – Russia proclaimed that they were to be Yeltsin's primary campaign organization. After weeks of fighting between the two groups, Sergei Filatov started to form what would be the ODOPP. The goal was to create a group that would serve as the campaign's predominant national support structure. The group took on the task of finishing the work to secure the requisite paperwork and signatures to officialize Yeltsin's nomination, a task which it finished by April 5. They thereafter convened the ODOPP's founding congress on April 6. The founding conference made official the ODOPP as an organization. It was immediately the most prominent organized movement supporting Yeltsin's candidacy.

The organization drew membership from a vast array of more than 250 preexisting organization, including political parties, unions, civic groups and social organization. Among the groups were Reform's New Course, Our Home – Russia, Alexander Yakovlev's Russian Party of Social Democracy, Lev Ponomaryov's Democratic Russia and Arkady Volsky's Russian Union of Industrialists and Entrepreneurs.

The organization was led by Filatov along with Ilyushin. They located the organization's headquarters on the tenth floor of the President Hotel, just above Yeltsin central campaign's offices. They hired dozens of campaign managers from various political parties to help run the organization. These included former Press Minister Sergei Gryzonov, Presidential Chief of Staff Nikolai Yegorov, and President of the "Politika" Foundation Vyacheslav Nikonov.

===== People's House =====
A sub-organization of ODOPP was named "People's House". This organization forged connections with citizen groups and was the unofficial disburser of campaign funds. This was also directly overseen by Filatov.

===== Key members of ODOPP leadership =====
- Nikolai Filatov (co-head of ODOPP; in charge of PR and People's House)
- Viktor Illyushin (co-head of ODOPP; national campaign organizer)
- Nikolai Yegorov (in charge of regional work)
- Vyacheslav Nikonov (in charge pre-election analysis)

==== Moscow campaign organization ====
A separate campaign organization existed in Moscow, dedicated to rallying votes in the nation's capital, which was a rare bastion of strong support for Yeltsin.

This component of the campaign was established early on. On 22 January 1996, it was reported that Moscow mayor Yury Luzhkov had set aside his disagreements with Yeltsin to join his campaign. Luzhkov would be tasked with helping deliver Yeltsin votes in Moscow.

==== Relations between organizations ====
With the exception of Moscow, it was not clarified what organizations were to be the campaign's primary regional representative. Consequentially, four different organizations acted under the separate assumptions that their regional offices were the primary regional representatives of the campaign. In each region, the formal national campaign organization (led by Yarov) would appoint its own representative. The ODOPP would appoint their own separate representative as well. Our Home – Russia, despite being a member of ODOPP, would also appoint representatives of their own. A fourth organization, named NarodnyiDom, would also appoint their own representative. In some locations the regional representatives of these organizations worked together, but in other locations there was no coordination between them.

While confusing, having multiple separate organizations also gave significant flexibility to the national campaign. In regions that had strong local parties and civic organizations, the campaign headquarters would often treat the ODOPP as their main regional representative. Therefore, the campaign would benefit from the work of the existing grassroots organizations that composed the ODOPP. However, in regions with weaker nongovernmental organizations, the campaign headquarters would often treat the official national campaign organization, headed by Yarov, as their main regional representative. This allowed them to avoid being "held hostage" to the demands of grassroots organizations that had little or no local influence.

== Outside groups ==
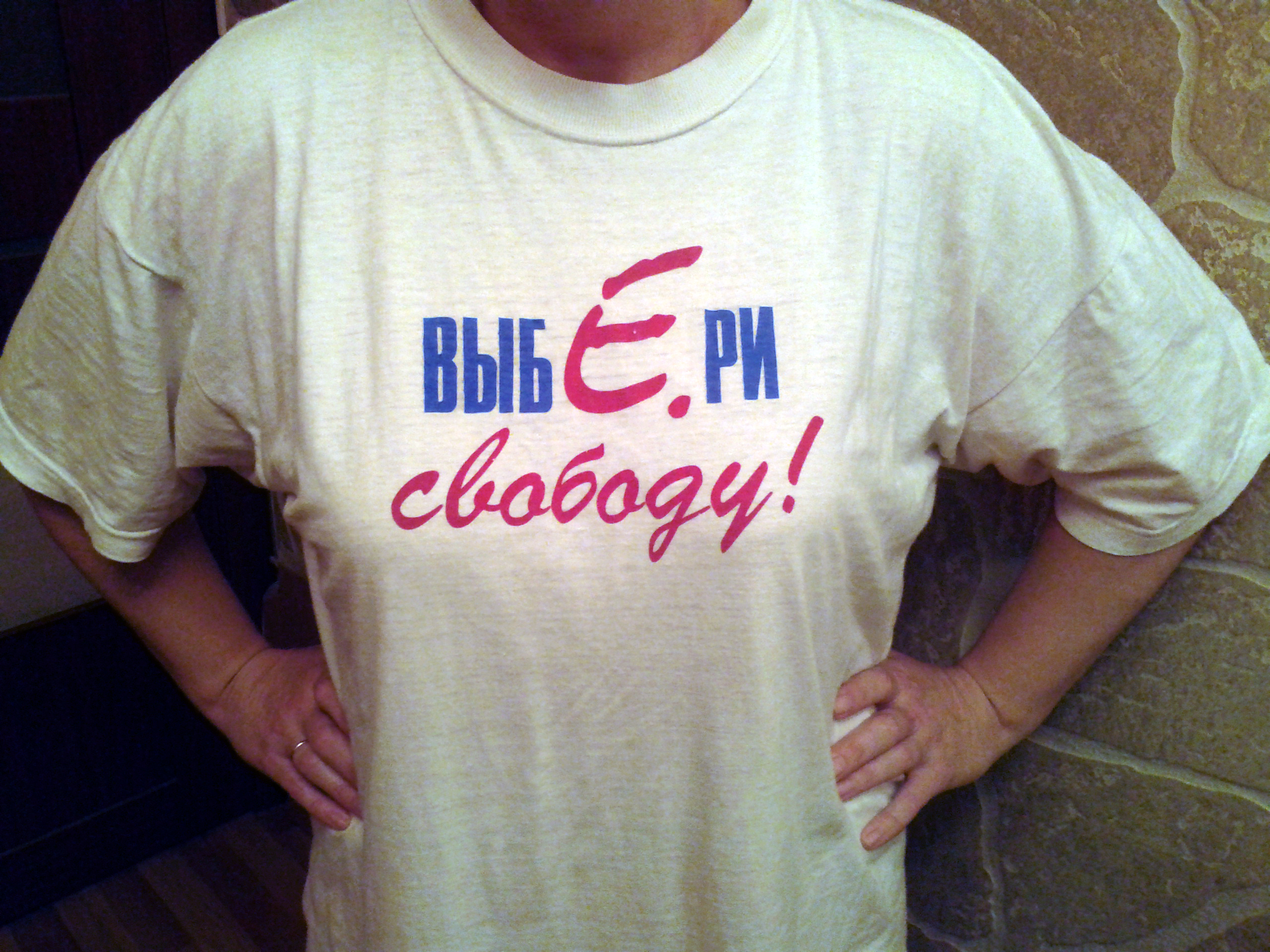
Shirt from the Vote or lose campaign

While many outside groups supporting Yeltsin officially coordinated with the campaign through the ODOPP, a number outside organizations functioned independently of the campaign.

=== NarodnyiDom ===
Narodny Dom (народныйдом; transl. NationalHouse) was an outside organization supporting Yeltsin's campaign. The official claim was that the nationwide organization provided nongovernmental consultive social services to citizens and that its chapters served a social club for residents with free coffee and occasional entertainment. In actuality, campaign money was funneled through the organization to eschew detection.

=== Vote or lose ===
Sergey Lisovsky organized the vote or lose campaign. Vote or lose was a $10 million series of television programs and rock concerts in the style of Rock the Vote. It was a get out the vote campaign aimed at mobilizing the youth vote in support of Yeltsin.

== See also ==
- History of Russia (1991–present)#"Shock therapy"
- Opinion polling for the 1996 Russian presidential election
- Spinning Boris, film based upon the story of American consultants advising the campaign
- Boris Yeltsin 1991 presidential campaign
- Shock Doctrine
