= George Gorton =

American political consultant

- Born: March 30, 1947
- Died: May 11, 2022 (aged 75)
- Citizenship: U.S.
- Education: San Diego State University
- Occupations: Political consultant, Pollster,
- Known for: Member of the presidential campaign teams for Nixon, Ford and Reagan; Member of the California gubernatorial campaign team for Arnold Schwarzenegger; Member of the 1996 presidential re-election campaign team for Russian President Boris Yeltsin.
- Political party: Republican
- Children: A.J. Gorton, Steven Moore

George Gorton (1947 – 2022) was a Republican political consultant from California, who worked on the elections of presidents, senators, governors, mayors, and international leaders in Russia, Panama, Romania, Czechoslovakia and Canada, among other places.

His four-month involvement in Boris Yeltsin's reelection campaign, along with his partners Joe Shumate and Dick Dresner, was the subject of a ten-page cover story in Time magazine, and a major motion picture (Spinning Boris) where George, the central figure in the movie, is played by Jeff Goldblum. Gorton pretended to be a flat-screen TV salesman, but was in fact helping Yeltsin's politically inexperienced daughter Tatiana Dyachenko to run Yeltsin's campaign. He was paid $250,000. Along with collaborators Richard Dresner and Joe Shumate, he leveraged Russian fears of civil war to present Yeltsin as the more stable choice.

Gorton served on the national campaign teams of Presidents Richard Nixon, Gerald Ford, and Ronald Reagan. He managed all of Governor Pete Wilson's successful gubernatorial and US Senate races. He was the first political consultant hired by Arnold Schwarzenegger in 2000 and was the chief strategist for his campaign for governor in 2003.
