= President Hotel =

President Hotel can refer to:

== Russia ==
- President Hotel (Moscow)

== Ukraine ==
- President Hotel (Kyiv)

== United States ==
(sorted by state, then city/town)

- President Hotel (Kansas City, Missouri), listed on the National Register of Historic Places (NRHP) in Jackson County, Missouri
- President Hotel (Atlantic City, New Jersey), demolished in 1979 for a cancelled casino redevelopment
- President Hotel, New York City, a hotel on 48th Street
- President Hotel (Mount Vernon, Washington), listed on the NRHP in Skagit County, Washington

== Others ==
- President Hotel (Athens)
- President Hotel (Macau)
- President Hotel (Tokyo)
