= Soskovets campaign strategy =

1996 Boris Yeltsin election strategy

The Soskovets campaign strategy refers to the strategy devised by Oleg Soskovets for Boris Yeltsin's 1996 reelection campaign for the Presidency of Russia. This strategy served as the initial template for Yeltsin's campaign before being discarded by March 1996.

The strategy was created under the premise that, in order to defeat nationalists and protofacist candidates in the 1996 election, Yeltsin would need to co-opt their policies. The strategy, however, failed to produce a rise in Yeltsin's poll numbers. The strategy was also a partial motive for Yeltsin's aggressive response to Chechen discord. His aggressive response in Chechnya initiated a highly unpopular war and consequentially had a significantly negative impact on his approval rating.

A plethora of coinciding factors persuaded Yeltsin to officially abandon the strategy by mid-March 1996.

== History ==
=== Conception ===
The campaign strategy had been devised by Oleg Soskovets in response to the defeat of pro-Yeltsin parties in the 1993 and 1995 legislative elections. To craft the strategy, Soskovets worked alongside others such as Alexander Korzhakov. Soskovets had come to the conclusion that for Yeltsin to win in 1996, he would need to adopt some of Zhirinovsky's style of rhetoric. Per Soskovet's assessment, Yelstin would need to position himself as an intermediate between the reformers and the Zhirinovsky-style proto-fascists by coopting the platforms of both. Yeltsin had grown distrusting of leading politicians and organizations of the reformist political movement. This contributed to Yeltsin's willingness to abandon many elements of reformist politics that he had previously championed. Soskovets earned influence as Yeltsin began ousting a number of reformists from his inner-circle.

=== Rise of the strategy ===
With Soskovets having become one of the most influential members of his inner circle, Yeltsin began to take steps to acquire a more nationalist image. To illustrate his new partial embrace of nationalism, Yeltsin spoke in his 1995 State of the Federation Speech of plans to strengthen the state by cracking down on crime. Yelstin issued harsh rhetoric against foes to the nation.

The cluster bombing of Chechnya bolstered the image of a more nationalist Yeltsin presidency. However, the bombings failed to produce any immediate improvement of Yeltsin's popularity. While the military action may have boosted Yeltsin's nationalist credentials, the war was opposed by the majority of Russians. Yeltsin's failure's to cleanly end the Chechen revolt had cost him support amongst the ranks of Russia's more liberal politicians. However it had earned him support in some consequential fractions of the armed forces. Nezavisimaya Gazeta editor Vitaly Tretyakov reported that, in the midst of this military action, perception of Yeltsin's grip on power was so weak that Russia's political elite was anticipating an eventual coup. Tretyakov even said that Russia's political elite would have been surprised if one did not occur.

Despite the aforementioned turmoil that the Soskovets strategy had ignited, it was not abandoned. Contrarily, it was soon adopted even further. This is due to the fact that the failure of reformist parties in the 1995 legislative elections bolstered Soskovet's argument. In the aftermath of the 1995 parliamentary elections, hard-liners championing the Soskovets strategy momentarily acquired a stronger role in Yeltsin's administration, as they were able to convince Yeltsin that the results of the legislative elections were proof that campaigning as a reformist would be disastrous for him. Many Yeltsin's inner-circle had also come to momentarily interpret the communist showing in 1995 as a protest vote against Yeltsin's economic reform program. They viewed the strong showing of Zhirinovsky's party as evidence that Russians desired a strong, decisive leader that would fight crime, terrorism and disorder, thus leading them agree to comply with Soskovets' strategy.

Yeltsin saw little use for reform-minded democrats. He was now convinced that in order to defeat Zyuganov, he would have to play the game similarly to the communists. Soskovets was appointed by Yeltsin as the coordinator of his still-unannounced reelection campaign.

There was some legitimacy to the premise of Soskovets' strategy. In early 1996, polling showed the concept of law and order to have strong appeal with Russians. Polls showed that rural dwellers were most concerned with having a strong country and that individuals in small towns were most concerned with the prosperity of the nation. The majority of individuals in other large cities were primarily concerned about social security. Freedom only polled as a leading concern for Muscovites. In fact, amongst the nation as a whole, freedom as well as equality and justice ranked relatively low as a primary concern of voters.

In January 1996 Yeltsin signaled his plunge further into the Soskovets strategy. In what was seen as a final break between Yeltsin and reformist democrats, he fired three key reformers from his government (Andrei Kozyrev, Sergei Filatov and Anatoly Chubais). His replacement for Kozyrov as Minister of Foreign Affairs, Yevgeny Primakov, earned him praise from nationalist figures, including both Zyuganov and Zhirinovsky. His replacement for Filatov as Chief of Presidential Administration, Nikolai Yegorov, was considered a hard-lined nationalist. These appointments were angled in accordance with the Soskovets strategy, allowing Yeltsin's administration to achieve a more nationalist image. Yeltsin also officially appointed Soskovets the head of his campaign effort. Yegorov, Korzhakov and Mikhail Barsukov also assumed leadership roles in the campaign effort. As part of the team, Yegorov found himself tasked with the responsibility of coordinating the campaign's collaboration with regional leaders.

Shortly after the aforementioned changes to his administration, Yeltsin ordered the payment of more than $700 million in back-wages to government employees. Additionally, in late January Yeltsin amped up his military efforts in Chechnya. This attempt to use military might to boost a more nationalist image for his presidency had disastrous results. Massive force was used against Chechen fighters and their hostages in Pervomaiskoe, Dagestan. Many civilians were killed, while Chechen leaders were able to escape. As a result of this humiliation, Yeltsin vowed he would end the war through a military victory rather than negotiation.

In February 1996, Yeltsin delivered his State of the Federation Speech. While his speech defended reforms, it criticized his government for making them too painful and promised to soften their blow. In the speech, he also issued harsh condemnation of his government for failing to increase social spending and compensate people's savings from the 1992 price liberalization. He also criticized his government for failing to address agriculture and military reform. He called for greater protection of Russian enterprises, and announced a new series of measures that would raise import tariffs. While he did vow to continue market reforms, the overall tone of his speech seemed to strike a tone that read more like an opposition address rather than a speech coming from a sitting president. In response to the speech, Zyuganov alleged, "At least a third of the speech has been copied from Communist Party documents."

While Yeltsin's State of the Federation speech had been greatly shaped the Soskovets strategy, by the time he delivered the speech, Yeltsin's inner-circle was already on its way towards abandoning the strategy.

=== Collapse of the strategy ===
While Yeltsin had not yet completely abandoned the strategy, by January and February 1996 he had already begun to make a course-correction, in many ways moving towards the political center instead of continuing to appease the fringes. Meanwhile, much of what would ultimately kill the Skoskovets strategy was being set in motion.

==== Soskovets' floundering efforts ====
Soskovets' operations were proving disastrous. Soskovets' attempts to utilize media as a tool failed. His standing with Yeltsin was severely harmed after he failed to complete the campaign's signature drive by the deadline Yeltsin had assigned him. This nearly doomed Yeltsin's campaign altogether.

==== Saratov "brainstorming group" ====
On January 11, Georgy Satarov had convened a team of twenty top political strategists of Yeltsin's for a "brainstorming group" for the stated goal of helping to write Yeltsin's State of the Federation speech and plan his campaign strategy. Satarov anticipated that Yeltsin was indeed going to run for reelection, and therefore desired to devise a winning strategy for him. Yeltsin's electoral prospects looked extraordinarily poor at that moment. The nation was in fear over a hostage crisis in the southern region of Chechnya, where armed conflict was raging on. Merely three weeks before the meeting, the Communist Party had won big in the 1995 parliamentary elections. Yeltsin's approval rating had plummeted to between 4% and 8%. A defensive Yeltsin had been preoccupying himself with firing the remaining free-market reformers in his cabinet, as per the Soskovets strategy.

Igor Mintusov, one of the strategists at the meeting, said of the meeting,

There was total pessimism, a total absence of hope. Of ten people who spoke, nine said it was senseless, a lost cause.

The group that Saratov had convened concluded that the only way for Yeltsin to win would be if he campaigned as a candidate of reform and stability, and that he would lose if he tried competing for the nationalist and communist vote as Soskovets intended him to. This stance would soon win the support of several key figures in Russia's business community.

==== Dyachenko joins the campaign ====
Sometime before the start of February, Yeltsin asked his daughter Tatyana Dyachenko to sit in on meetings of Soskovets' campaign management team. Soon after, Dyachenko began expressing concerns about the Soskovets' campaign team.

The only figure from the business community who was serving on Soskovets' campaign management board was Berezovsky. He had only just joined shortly before Dyachenko began attending meanings. He also had felt that things were not looking good for the campaign.

==== Formation of Semibankirschina ====
A key development in the campaign took place at the 1996 World Economic Forum, held February 2–5. Yeltsin's chances were so poorly regarded at the time of the forum, that Zyuganov was greeted by Western leaders and the international media as the presumptive victor of the impending election.

Upset by the polite reception they witnessed Zyuganov receive, Berezovsky and several key Russian business figures met with each other and agreed that a drastic shift was needed in Yeltsin's campaign strategy. The businessmen regarded themselves as having the most to lose from a Communist Party victory in the 1996 election. Amongst them were Berezovsky, Vladimir Gusinsky, Mikhail Khodorkovsky, and Vladimir Vinogradov; the four of whom teamed up to form a united front against Zyuganov, which they dubbed the "Davos Pact".

They quickly recruited Anatoly Chubais (a reformer that Yeltsin had previously fired) to serve as the chairman of their shadow effort to devise an alternative strategy for Yeltsin's reelection. Upon returning from Davos, the four initial members of the "Davos Pact" added Vladimir Potanin, Alexander Smolensky, Mikhail Fridman, and Pyotr Aven to their effort. Together, the seven of them would subsequently be dubbed Semibankirschina after the election.

In late January, Chubais (now working for the aforementioned Semibankirschina shadow campaign team) scheduled a twenty minute meeting with Yeltsin. He instead spent two and a half hours attempting to convince Yeltsin to entirely abandon the Soskovets campaign strategy. At this meeting, Yeltsin apparently learned for the first time that he had fallen twenty points behind Zyuganov in the polls. Shortly after Chubais' meeting with Yeltsin, Boris Berezovsky and his business associates met with Yeltsin and promised to finance his campaign, under the condition that the president would hire a new campaign team.

==== Growth of the shadow campaigns ====
In late-January, members of Yeltsin's inner-circle began to inform him that they were worried that Soskovets' strategy was a losing one. After Soskovets' fumbled the signature drive several dozen volunteer 'action groups' quickly stepped in and managed to collect the needed signatures, ultimately saving Yeltsin's candidacy.

By February, Yeltsin had begun to abandon Soskovets' advice. At this time, several shadow campaigns were hard at work to support Yeltsin's candidacy. Working for the Semibankirschina, Chubais had already assembled a select group of political strategists with whom he started to plan an alternative campaign strategy for Yeltsin. Additionally, the team that Satarov had assembled was also working as a shadow campaign, plotting a platform for Yeltsin to campaign upon. At the same time, Sergei Filatov (one of the reformists that Yeltsin had earlier fired) began making preparations for a nongovernmental organization that would serve as the united front of political parties and social groups backing the president.

Members of shadow campaigns began to be invited into Yeltsin's official campaign team. By early February, Filatov had been appointed as the interim head of the campaign headquarters. Filatov was also tasked with laying the groundwork for Yeltsin's official campaign committee.

=== Death of the strategy ===
Approximately two weeks after the World Economic Forum, the Semibankirschina team of financiers held a meeting with Yeltsin. The meeting had been arranged by Illyushin at Berezovsky's request. Yeltsin had expected the meeting to be about campaign financing. To his surprise, the meeting instead was about the Semibankirschina's belief that the Soskovets strategy had no hope of succeeding. The meeting seemed to have shaken Yeltsin, who immediately agreed to grant Chubais and the Semibankirschina greater influence in the campaign. However, Yeltsin procrastinated making any actionable change to his campaign strategy.

With nearly a month passing with little change, on March 14 Saratov wrote Yeltsin a scathing memorandum decrying that the campaign was still in a state of wreckage. Saratov wrote Yeltsin,

[Soskovets] is not a specialist on public politics or electoral technologies, as immediately revealed itself. But this has not been offset by the possible merits on which you apparently were counting.
Soskovets has displayed no organizational ability: The headquarters has not yet begun to work normally. He is unable to make contact with people who have a different point of view but are necessary to the campaign. His influence on the regional leadership has been exercised through vulgar and vain officiousness, which not only compromises you as president but turns off possible allies. The same methods are being employed, with the same result, with government agencies and with representatives of the mass media and of commercial and banking circles. The weirdest thing is that Soskovets has not resolved the problem of mobilizing in a short span of time the financial resources needed to wage the campaign. . . . More than a month has been lost.

Yeltsin had begun to consider the advice of Alexander Korzhakov, who urged him to cancel or postpone the election in order to prevent a Communist victory. On March 18, Dyachenko arranged a meeting between Yeltsin and Chubais. Chubais addressed Yeltsin in an unusually assertive manner, and managed to persuade Yeltsin against considering Korzhakov's plan to postpone the election. Thus, Yeltsin had officially decided to proceed with an election.

March 19, Yeltsin took two major steps to modify the campaign's leadership. First, he established a campaign council headed by Chubais to act as a leadership group. Secondly, he impaneled an "analytical panel", also headed by Chubais, to provide strategic advice to his campaign.

On March 23, the Semibankirschina team of financiers, along with Chubais, held a meeting with Yeltsin. They delivered Yeltsin, who was still oblivious of the depths to which his popularity had sunken, eye opening news. They alerted Yeltsin of the fact that he lacked any popular support, and that all polling indicated that the campaign headed towards a crushing defeat.

Instead of abandoning his candidacy, Yeltsin ultimately reorganized his campaign structure. Dyachenko was instrumental in convincing Yeltsin to replace Soskovets as the head of the campaign. While Yelstin distrusted his campaign advisors, he placed great trust in the advice of his daughter. On March 23, day after the meeting with the Semibankirschina team, Yeltsin fired Soskovets, officially ending the Soskovets campaign.
