= Xerox affair =

Russian political controversy

The Xerox affair was a Russian political controversy that took place during the second round of the 1996 Russian presidential election. The controversy stems from the June 19 detention of two staffers of President Boris Yeltsin's reelection campaign outside of the Russian White House. Security agents discovered $500,000 in a Xerox (from which the scandal takes it name) copy-paper box that was being carried by one of the men. It was soon discovered that the staffers had been arrested and interrogated at the behest of Mikhail Barsukov and Alexander Korzhakov, both of whom were members of Yeltsin's campaign organization and presidential administration.

The scandal, which occurred only two days after the conclusion of the initial round of the Russian presidential election (and approximately two weeks before the second round), resulted in the dismissal of Korzhakov and Barsukov from their roles in Yeltsin's presidential administration and campaign organization, as well as the dismissal of their political ally, Deputy Prime Minister Oleg Soskovets.

== Background ==
The scandal occurred while Boris Yeltsin was running for reelection as the president of Russia. The initial round of the election had occurred on June 16, with both Yeltsin and Gennady Zyuganov advancing to the second round (a runoff was necessitated by the failure of any candidate to receive a majority of the first-round vote). The second round was scheduled to be held on July 3.

Oleg Soskovets had drafted Yeltsin's original, abandoned, campaign strategy, and had originally been in charge of Yeltsin's campaign, overseeing a management team which had Korzhakov and Barsukov functioning as his deputies

By the spring of 1996, Soskovets' leadership of the campaign had begun to dissipate. This culminated in March with the creation of a "campaign council", which usurped much of the role Soskovets' management team had held in controlling the campaign, followed shortly thereafter with the firing of Soskovets as campaign chairman. These developments meant that the nationalist leaning management team Soskovets had overseen was replaced by a liberal-leaning "campaign council" and Soskovets, a hardline nationalist, was replaced as campaign chairman by Anatoly Chubais, an avid reformer. This meant the official abandonment of the campaign strategy which Soskovets had crafted.

While Soskovets was no longer in charge of the campaign, his allies Korzhakov, and Barsukov remained a part of the campaign, both serving as members of the "campaign council". However, dissatisfied with the new direction of the campaign, they, in tandem with Soskovets, came into conflict with the new leaders of the campaign.

== Arrest and initial scandal ==
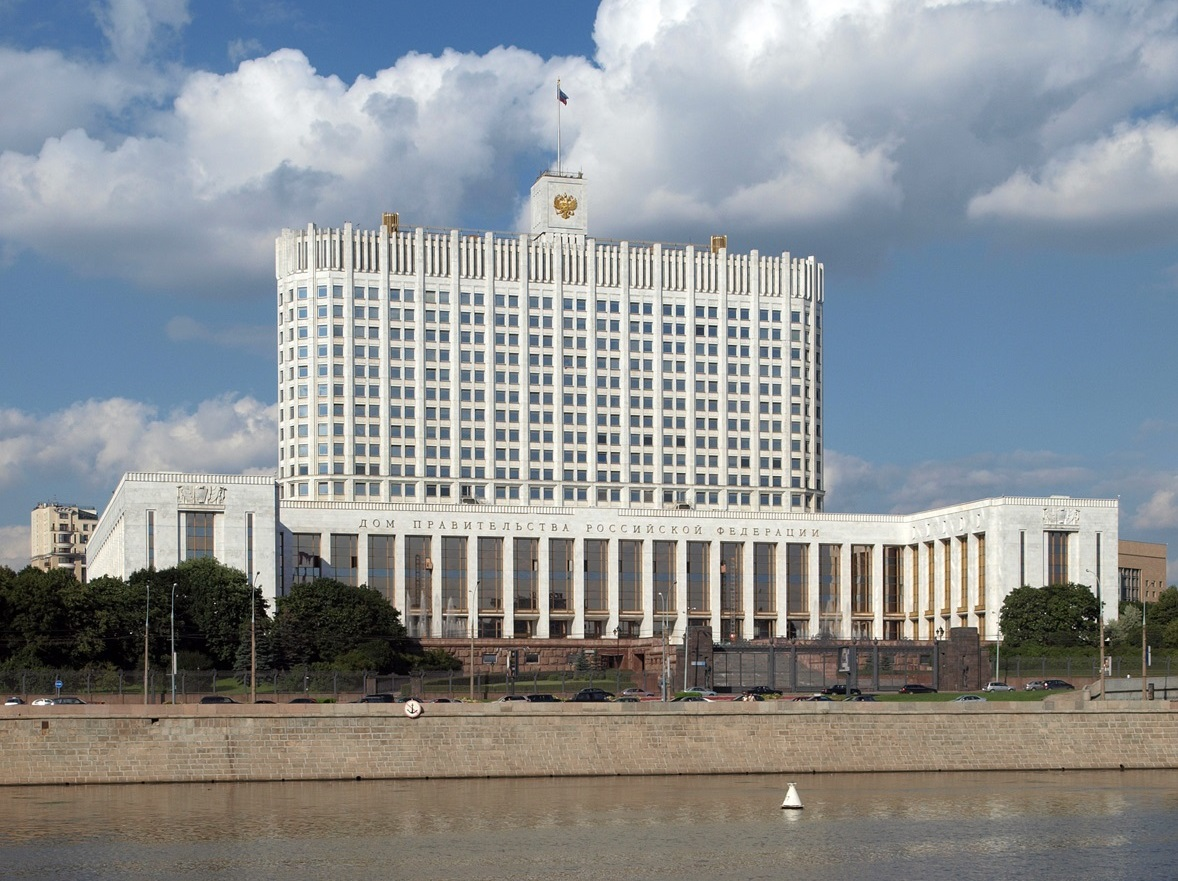
Staffers were detained while leaving the Russian White House

On June 19, at the behest of Korzhakov and Barsukov, security guards detained Sergey Lisovsky (the general director of the company ORT-advertising) and Arkady Evstafiev (an assistant to Chubais) while the two were leaving the Russian White House. The security agents discovered $500,000 in a Xerox copy-paper box that was being carried by one of the men. As a result of this discovery, and at the further behest of Barsukov and Korzhakov, the men were then arrested and interrogated.

The motivation of Barsukov and Korzhakov for orchestrating the arrests had likely been Korzhakov's resentment towards campaign manager Antoly Chubais. Korzhakov had been a key individual urging Yeltsin to postpone the election. He had earlier caused a media frenzy in early May by publicly asserting the opinion that Yeltsin should postpone the election. Distrusting and disagreeing with Chubais, Korzhakov and the others were likely attempting to smear Chubais in Yeltsin's eyes, hoping for him to fall out of favor.

The arrest and the involvement of Barsukov and Kozhakov was reported within hours by television networks.

The main controversy which erupted surrounded the corrupt actions of Barsukov and Korzhakov in orchestrating the arrests in an apparent effort to discredit Chubais.

Controversy also arose from discovery of the $500,000, as it raised suspicions of fraudulent finances being conducted by Yeltsin's campaign.

== Immediate aftermath ==
On June 20 Yeltsin fired Korzhakov and Barsukov, as well as their political ally Soskovets, from their roles in his presidential administration and campaign. Yeltsin alleged that the three of them had been interfering in his reelection campaign. Korzhakov and Barsukov were also fired from their roles in Yeltsin's campaign.

In the immediate aftermath of the scandal Chubais and Alexander Lebed managed to quickly persuade Yeltsin into believing that he would lose the election if he kept the three in his administration. Yeltsin desired to distance himself from any corruption investigation that might arise from the event, and therefore had obliged to their firings.

== Financial fraud allegations stemming from the incident ==
The discovery of $500,000 raised suspicions of fraudulent finances on the part of the Yeltsin campaign. Chubais publicly proclaimed that such allegations were merely the work of political adversaries. However, he privately conspired to cover-up any evidence of illegal transactions.

=== Criminal investigation ===
On July 19, 1996 the Chief Military Prosecutor's office opened a criminal investigation into illegal currency transactions. The investigation was closed in April 1997, was reopened in January 1999, and finally closed in May 1999. The investigation was supervised by the head of the FSB Directorate for Moscow and the Moscow Region, A. V. Trofimov.

During the investigation Lisovsky was represented by lawyer Anatoly Kucherena.
