= Viktoriya Mitina =

Russian politician

Viktoria Alexandrovna Mitina (Russian: Виктория Александровна Митина, born 1949 in Kiev) is a Russian politician.

A former Komsomol activist and engineer at Zelenograd Institute of Molecular Electronics, she went into politics in 1989, joining Boris Yeltsin's support team for the Congress of People's Deputies election. From 1991 to 1997, she was first deputy prefect of Zelenograd Administrative Okrug for science, industry and entrepreneurship development.

In 1998, 1991 and 1996 she was a representative of Boris Yeltsin during the parliamentary and presidential elections.

In November 1997 – May 1998 she was a Deputy Chief of the Presidential Staff for regions, succeeded in 1998 by Vladimir Putin, in November 1998 – January 1999 she was President Yeltsin's adviser.

She has the federal state civilian service rank of 1st class Active State Councillor of the Russian Federation.

Now she is a Deputy Head of Moscow Oblast.

She is a friend of Tatyana Dyachenko, Yeltsin's daughter.
