= Vote or lose =

Campaign in support of Boris Yeltsin during the 1996 Russian presidential election

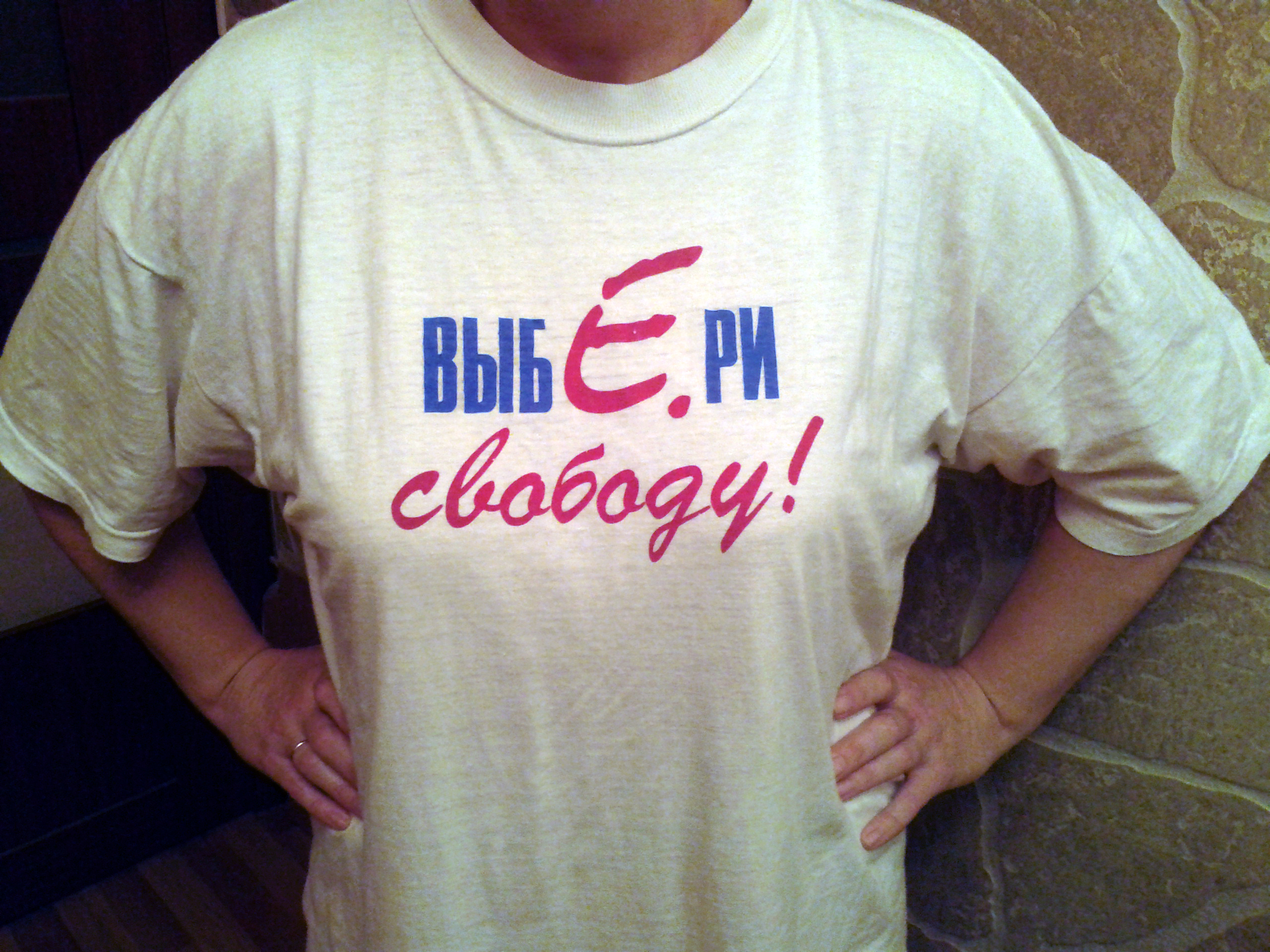
A woman wearing a shirt from the vote or lose campaign. (Note: The shirt reads "Выбери свободу!", or "choose freedom!". The "Е" is capitalised as part of Yeltsin's surname in Cyrillic (Ельцин).)

Vote or lose (Russian: Голосуй, или проиграешь, romanized: Golosuy, ili proigrayesh') was a campaign during Boris Yeltsin's 1996 presidential campaign. The campaign, which was organised by television producer Sergey Lisovsky, was targeted towards youth, encouraging them to vote for Yeltsin as opposed to Gennady Zyuganov of the Communist Party of the Russian Federation and Vladimir Zhirinovsky of the Liberal Democratic Party of Russia, both of whom were regarded as authoritarian leaders.

== Origins ==
By early 1996, opinion polling for the 1996 Russian presidential election showed Yeltsin underperforming heavily compared to his most prominent opponents, communist Gennady Zyuganov, liberal Grigory Yavlinsky, and ultranationalist Vladimir Zhirinovsky. According to polls, between January and February 1996, Yeltsin averaged at 9.0%, versus 17.4% for Zyuganov, 10.6% for Yavlinsky, and 9.7% for Zhirinovsky. However, polls of youth conducted by the Russian Public Opinion Research Centre in April 1996 showed that if Russian youth were attracted to vote, around 70% would vote for Yeltsin. From here emerged the vote or lose campaign, by which Yeltsin sought to improve his chances of victory.

Another inspiration for Yeltsin allegedly came from Bill Clinton's successful "Choose or Lose" campaign during the 1992 United States presidential election, which included several celebrities, such as Michael Jackson. Similarly to Clinton's "choose or lose", vote or lose also included several Russian musicians.

== Campaign ==
Throughout the campaign, many bands were involved, including Alla Pugacheva, Aleksander Serov, Agatha Christie, Nautilus Pompilius, Valery Leontiev, and Alexander Malinin participated in the campaign. Several songs were released as part of the campaign.

External media

Images
- Photo by Yuri Kadobnov

Video
- Russia - Yeltsin on the Campaign Trail

Yeltsin himself, though unmentioned in many of the advertisements, actively participated in the campaign, appearing with celebrities on multiple occasions. On one occasion, during a performance by Yevgeny Osin in Rostov-on-Don, Yeltsin appeared on stage and danced. A photo from the event, taken by a photographer from the Associated Press, won the Pulitzer Prize.

Yeltsin made several promises which were viewed as appealing to the youth, among them the abolition of conscription and the shift to a full volunteer military as early as 1998, which had become popular alongside the First Chechen War's increasing unpopularity. Many of these promises, however, including the abolition of conscription, were not kept.
