= Spinning Boris =

- DVD cover
- Directed by: Roger Spottiswoode
- Written by: Yuri Zeltser; Grace Cary Bickley
- Produced by: Cydney Bernard
- Starring: Jeff Goldblum; Anthony LaPaglia; Liev Schreiber
- Cinematography: John S. Bartley
- Edited by: Michael Pacek
- Music by: Jeff Danna
- Release date: October 23, 2003
- Running time: 112 minutes
- Country: United States
- Language: English

Spinning Boris is a 2003 American comedy film, directed by Roger Spottiswoode and starring Jeff Goldblum, Anthony LaPaglia and Liev Schreiber. In the film, Boris Yeltsin secretly hires three American consultants during his 1996 reelection campaign, when his approval rating was at 6%. With the help of the consultants, Yeltsin won the election six months later. The film claimed to be based on the true story of three American political consultants who worked for the successful reelection campaign of Boris Yeltsin in 1996.

== Plot ==
In early 1996, three Republican Party campaign operatives take a secret job to assist Boris Yeltsin's reelection. Once in Moscow, they learn Yeltsin is polling at 6% against the Communist Party of the Russian Federation candidate Gennady Zyuganov with the election only a few months away. They decide to vote on whether to stay. Dick Dresner wants to go home, George Gorton and Joe Shumate vote to stay in Moscow. They get the attention of Yeltsin's daughter Tatyana Yumasheva. They then start to do polling, focus groups, messaging, and spin. Yeltsin's poll numbers begin to go up. The three men are unsure who hired them. They do not know whether Yeltsin's allies want him to win. Eventually, Yeltsin wins the election.

== Cast ==
- Jeff Goldblum as George Gorton
- Anthony LaPaglia as Dick Dresner
- Liev Schreiber as Joe Shumate
- Boris Krutonog as Felix Braynin
- Svetlana Efremova as Tatyana Dyachenko
- Shauna MacDonald as Lisa
- Gregory Hlady as Andrei Lugov
- Vladimir Radian as Vasso
- Ilia Volok as Elvis Impersonator
- Konstantin Kazakov as Oleg Soskovets
- Judah Katz as Michael Kramer

== See also ==
- Boris Yeltsin presidential campaign, 1996
- History of Russia (1991–present)#"Shock therapy"
