= President Hotel (Moscow) =

Hotel in Moscow, Russia

President Hotel Президент Отель
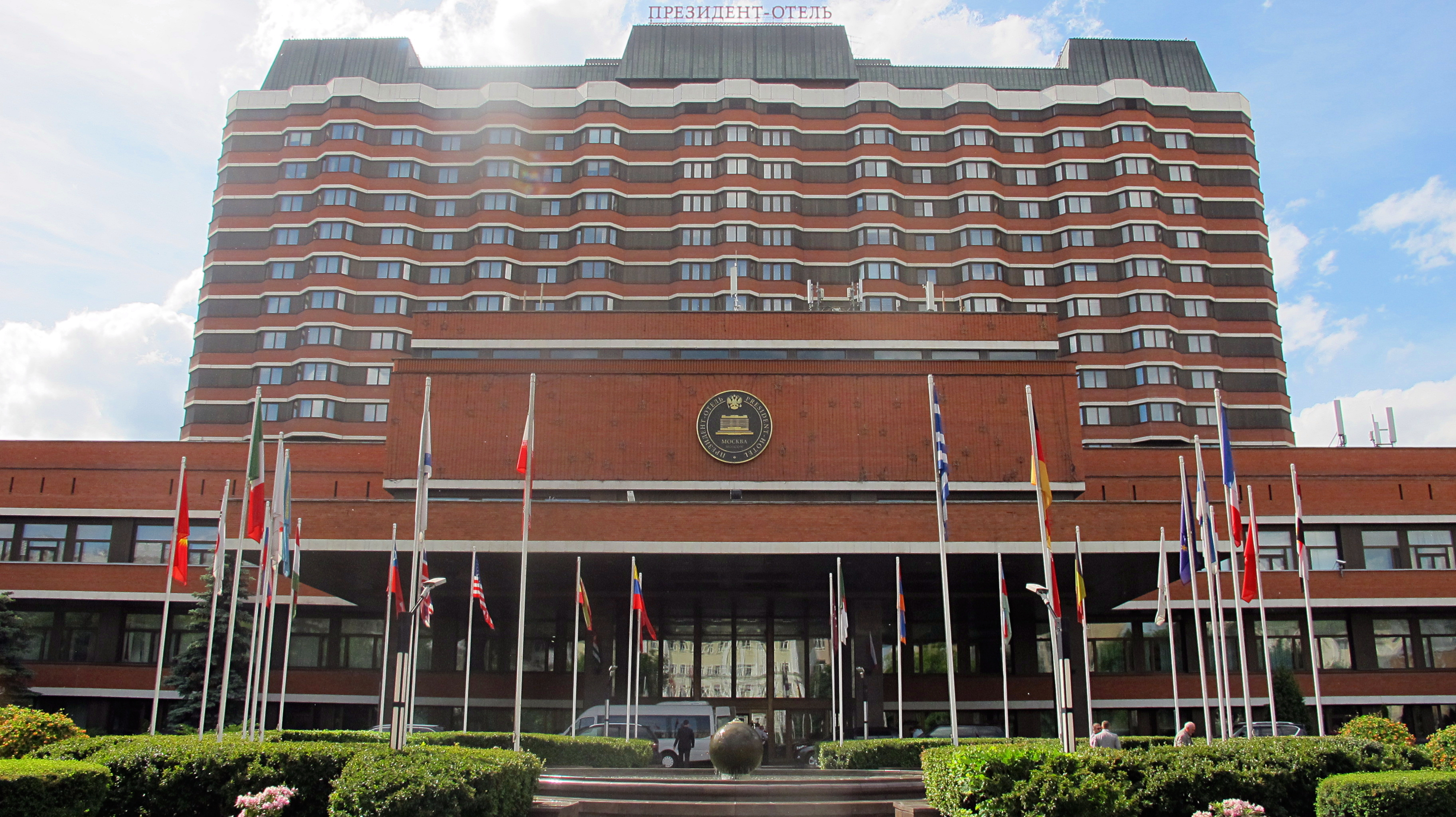
- President Hotel

- Location within Central Moscow

General information
- Location: Moscow, Russia, 24, Bolshaya Yakimanka St.
- Coordinates: 55°44′14.59″N 37°36′46.91″E
- Opening: 1983
- Owner: Administration of the President of the Russian Federation

Technical details
- Floor count: 14

Design and construction
- Architects: I. Dyachenko, I. Leonov
- Developer: Central Committee of the Communist Party of the Soviet Union

Other information
- Number of rooms: 206

Website
- Official website

Hotel President is a four-star hotel complex in Moscow at Bolszaja Yakimanka St. 24 (ул. Большая Якиманка). It consists of 206 rooms. The facility is equipped with a complex of 20 conference rooms, cinema/theatre, swimming pool, and medical point.

== History ==
Built in 1983 by the company Mosstroy No. 16 (Мосстрой № 16) of the Glavmospromstroy union (Главмоспромстрой), now Mospromstrоy (Моспромстрой), on the order of the Central Committee of the Communist Party of the Soviet Union (CPSU). The hotel was opened under the name "Oktyabrskaya".

Since 1992, it has been operated under the name of Hotel President by the Administration of the President of the Russian Federation.

In the years 1983–1992, the facility was secret, outside the hotel did not have any signboard, access was only to accommodated guests, party and government leadership and senior CPSU officials. The cost of the stay was covered by the Central Committee of the CPSU. Separate rooms in the building were used by the Secretary General of the Central Committee of the CPSU, currently the President of Russia, and the security services.

A fallout shelter for 350 people was built in the hotel.

== In popular culture ==
The three American political advisers of Spinning Boris were lodged at the hotel.

== The complex includes ==
- Hotel Arbat (Гостиница Арбат) **** at 12 Plotnicki Zaulek (Плотников переулок), built in 1960 as the Oktiabrskaya hotel (Гостиница Октябрьская), from 1983 Oktiabrskaya Hotel-2 (Гостиница Октябрьская-2);
- Hotel Los (Гостиница Лось) *** at Taymyrska St 1 (ул. Таймырская).
