= Valentin Yumashev =

Russian journalist (born 1957)

- Валентин Юмашев
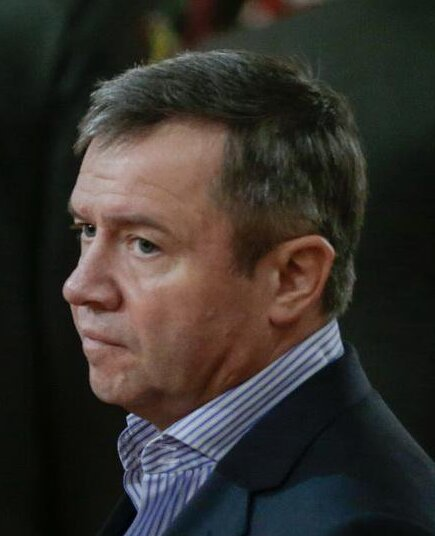
- Yumashev in 2015

Kremlin Chief of Staff
- In office 11 March 1997 – 7 December 1998
- President: Boris Yeltsin
- Preceded by: Anatoly Chubais
- Succeeded by: Nikolay Bordyuzha

Personal details
- Born: 15 December 1957 (age 67) Perm, Russian SFSR, Soviet Union
- Spouses: Irina Vedeneyeva (divorced) Tatyana Yeltsina (m. 2001)
- Children: 2

Valentin Borisovich Yumashev (Russian: Валентин Борисович Юмашев; born 15 December 1957) is a Russian journalist, politician and businessman-developer, who is the son-in-law of former President Boris Yeltsin and a member of his inner circle. He has the federal state civilian service rank of 1st class Active State Councillor of the Russian Federation.

He was Editor-in-Chief of Ogonyok from 1995 to 1996. In 1996, he was appointed adviser to President Boris Yeltsin for public relations. In March 1997, Yumashev succeeded Anatoly Chubais in the powerful position of the Chairman of the Presidential Executive Office. In December 1998, he was dismissed from that position. He now works in real estate development.

== Biography ==
Valentin Yumashev was born 15 December 1957 in Perm. His family moved to the Moscow region when he was sixteen.

He entered the Faculty of Journalism of the Moscow State University but did not finish his studies. In 1976, he started working as a courier at the Komsomolskaya Pravda newspaper. A year later, Yumashev was drafted into the army.

In 1996, Yumashev was appointed advisor to the president on interaction with the mass media.

In 1997–1998, he served as head of the presidential administration, succeeding Anatoly Chubais.

In 1999, Yumashev allegedly initiated the appointment of Vladimir Putin as prime minister of the Russian Federation.

News of Yumashev's resignation, in April 2022, from an unpaid post as adviser to Vladimir Putin, became widely known at the end of May 2022.

Valentin Yumashev is also known as a co-author of two books with Boris Yeltsin: Against the Grain: An Autobiography and The Struggle for Russia. Yumashev talks about it in the book The age of Berezovsky by Petr Aven. Yumashev recalls: "Boris Nikolayevich had a very strict rule forbidding his family members to speak about politics <...> I could talk politics with him because we were working on his books".

== Family ==
From his first marriage with Irina Vedeneyeva, he has a daughter. In 2001, Polina married Oleg Deripaska; they divorced in 2018.

Yumashev and his second wife Tatyana Yumasheva (daughter of the first president of Russia Boris Yeltsin) own half of the Imperia Tower in "Moscow International Business Center" and half of the business center of "CITY" (49.58% of shares).

It was reported that he, along with his wife and their daughter, have been citizens of Austria since 2009.

Political offices
Preceded by Anatoly Chubais	Chief of the Kremlin Chief of Staff; 1997–1998	Succeeded by Nikolay Bordyuzha
