= Tatyana Yumasheva =

Russian politician (born 1960)

- Татьяна Юмашева
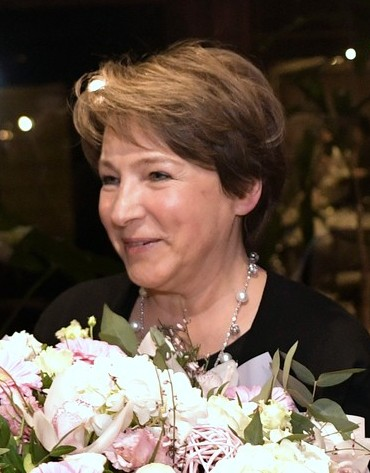
- Yumasheva in 2020

Adviser to the President of Russia
- In office 28 June 1997 – 3 January 2000
- President: Boris Yeltsin; Vladimir Putin (acting)

Personal details
- Born: Tatyana Borisovna Yeltsina; 17 January 1960 (age 66)
- Spouse: Vilen Khairullin (m. 1980; div. 1982) Leonid Dyachenko (m. 1987; div. 2001) Valentin Yumashev (m. 2001)
- Children: 3
- Parents: Boris Yeltsin (father); Naina Yeltsina (mother)

Tatyana Borisovna Yumasheva (Russian: Татьяна Борисовна Юмашева; formerly Dyachenko (Дьяченко); née Yeltsina (Ельцина); born 17 January 1960) is the younger daughter of former Russian president Boris Yeltsin and Naina Yeltsina. Since a rush decision in November 2009 supported by auto magnate Frank Stronach, Yumasheva and her children have been citizens of Austria.

== Early life and education ==
She graduated from MSU Faculty of Computational Mathematics and Cybernetics in 1983. She then worked at the Salyut Design Bureau and later at Khrunichev State Research and Production Space Center until 1994.

== Career ==
Yeltsin made her his personal advisor in 1996 when his re-election campaign was faltering. A memoir written by Yeltsin, as reported by The New York Times, credited her with advising against "banning the Communist Party, dissolving Parliament and postponing presidential elections" in 1996. She was particularly influential as Yeltsin recovered from heart surgery in late 1996. She became the keystone in a small group of advisors known as "The Family", although the others (Alexander Voloshin and Valentin Yumashev) were not Yeltsin relatives. Boris Berezovsky and other oligarchs were often included in the group as well.

In 2000, her name came up during a corruption investigation, but no charges were brought. She remained on the staff of Yeltsin's hand-picked successor Vladimir Putin, and was a key adviser to him during his 2000 election campaign, but Putin dismissed her later that year.

She is portrayed in the 2003 satirical comedy Spinning Boris, based on the real experiences of U.S. political consultants in the 1996 campaign.

She and Yumashev provided editorial assistance in preparing the last volume of her father's memoirs, Midnight Diaries.

=== Business interests ===
According to reports by Vedomosti, Yumasheva and her husband have ownership stakes in construction and real estate ventures. These include a reported 50% ownership of the Imperia Tower skyscraper in Moscow-City and a 49.58% controlling stake in the construction management company PAO CITY. Valentin Yumashev has denied these ownership claims.

=== Real estate ===
In 2021, media reports indicated that Yumasheva owns a villa valued at €15 million on a Caribbean island. In 2010, she had stated on her LiveJournal blog that she owned no property abroad, offering a challenge to anyone who could find such property. Lyudmila Telen, First Deputy Executive Director of the Yeltsin Center, stated that at the time of Yumasheva's 2010 statement, the family did not own foreign property, as the villa was purchased in December 2020.

Valentin Yumashev, in whose name the villa was registered, acknowledged the purchase to Novaya Gazeta. He stated that he financed the acquisition through a loan from a Russian bank and personal funds, including dividends from a 1.6% stake in En+ given to him by his former son-in-law Oleg Deripaska, as well as income from consulting and corporate board positions.

== Personal life ==
In 1980, Yeltsina married fellow Moscow State University student, Vilen Ayratovich Khairullin. In 1981, they had a son. They divorced in 1982.

In 1987, she married Leonid Yuryevich Dyachenko (known as Alexei), a businessman, designer from Salyut Design Bureau, billionaire, and executive director of Urals Energy, a company under investigation by the Putin government as of 2008. In 1995, they had a son before divorcing in 2001.

In 2001, Tatyana married her fellow presidential adviser Valentin Yumashev, and flew to London to have a baby daughter. Until 2018, Yumashev was the father-in-law of oligarch Oleg Deripaska.

Tatyana is a close friend of another multi-billionaire, Roman Abramovich.

Along with her husband and their daughter, she has been a citizen of Austria since 2009.

On 25 February 2022, Yumasheva condemned the Russian invasion of Ukraine.

== Sanctions ==
On 3 June 2025, Yumasheva and her husband were added to Canada's sanctions list. According to the Anti-Corruption Foundation, the sanctions were imposed on individuals alleged to have supported or benefited from the Russo-Ukrainian war. The Anti-Corruption Foundation had previously included Yumasheva on its list of officials, citing her role in facilitating Vladimir Putin's appointment first as Prime Minister and then as President of Russia.

== Awards ==
- Commendation of the President of the Russian Federation for active participation in the organization of the presidential election campaign (1996)

== See also ==
- List of Russians
