= 2024 Kemerovo Oblast gubernatorial election =

Election

← 2023	6–8 September 2024	2029 →
- Turnout: 63.86%
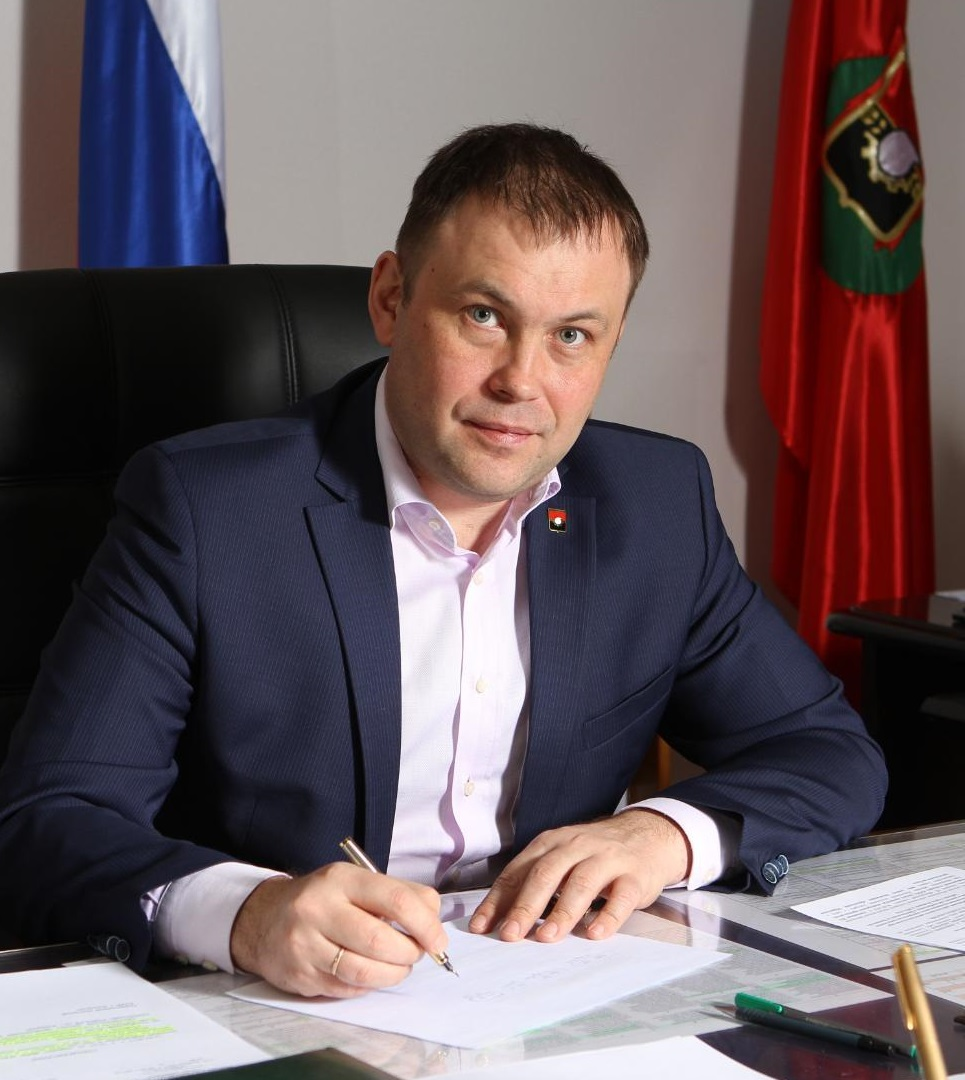
		LDPR	CPRF
Candidate	Ilya Seredyuk	Maria Gorodeshtyan	Aleksandr Karpov
Party	United Russia	LDPR	CPRF
Popular vote	949,185	86,971	71,770
Percentage	78.38%	7.18%	5.93%
- Results by raions and cities
Governor before election
Ilya Seredyuk (acting)
United Russia
Governor-elect
Ilya Seredyuk
United Russia

The 2024 Kemerovo Oblast gubernatorial election took place on 6–8 September 2024, on common election day. Acting Governor Ilya Seredyuk was elected for a full term in office.

== Background ==
Sergey Tsivilyov, then–Deputy Governor and former coal executive, was appointed acting Governor of Kemerovo Oblast in April 2018, replacing longtime Governor Aman Tuleyev. Tsivilyov won election for a full term in September 2018 with 81.3% of the vote and won reelection for a second term in 2023 with 85.2%.

In May 2024 Governor Tsivilyov was mentioned as potential future Minister of Energy. On May 11, 2024, re-appointed Prime Minister Mikhail Mishustin nominated Governor Sergey Tsivilyov to serve in his second cabinet as Minister of Energy, replacing Nikolay Shulginov. State Duma Committee on Energy unanimously supported Tsivilyov's nomination on May 12, while the full chamber voted 375–0–57 to approve Tsivilyov as new Minister of Energy two days later.

After his nomination, Governor Tsivilyov left Kemerovo on May 12, 2024, leaving First Deputy Governor – Chairman of the Kemerovo Oblast Government Ilya Seredyuk as acting Governor until the temporary replacement be appointed by the President. Seredyuk and Tyumen Mayor Ruslan Kukharuk were mentioned as potential candidates for the appointment. On May 15 President Vladimir Putin appointed Ilya Seredyuk as acting Governor of Kemerovo Oblast.

== Candidates ==
In Kemerovo Oblast candidates for Governor can be nominated only by registered political parties. Candidate for Governor of Kemerovo Oblast should be a Russian citizen and at least 30 years old. Candidates for Governor should not have a foreign citizenship or residence permit. Each candidate in order to be registered is required to collect at least 8% of signatures of members and heads of municipalities. Also gubernatorial candidates present 3 candidacies to the Federation Council and election winner later appoints one of the presented candidates.

=== Declared ===
Candidate name, political party		Occupation	Status	Ref.
Maria Gorodeshtyan; Liberal Democratic Party		Member of Legislative Assembly of Kemerovo Oblast (2023–present)	Registered	
Aleksandr Karpov; Communist Party		Member of Council of People's Deputies of Belovo (2023–present); Businessman	Registered	
Roman Kleyster; New People		Member of Legislative Assembly of Kemerovo Oblast (2018–present)	Registered	
Ilya Seredyuk; United Russia	Ilya Seredyuk	Acting Governor of Kemerovo Oblast (2024–present); Former First Deputy Governor of Kemerovo Oblast – Chairman of the Government of Kemerovo Oblast (2022–2024)	Registered	
Yury Skvortsov; SR–ZP		Deputy Chairman of the Legislative Assembly of Kemerovo Oblast (2018–present); 2015, 2018 and 2023 gubernatorial candidate	Registered	

=== Candidates for Federation Council ===
Gubernatorial candidate, political party	Candidates for Federation Council	Status
Ilya Seredyuk; United Russia	* Nikolay Senchurov, Member of Legislative Assembly of Kemerovo Oblast (2023–present) * Aleksei Sinitsyn, incumbent Senator (2018–present) * Aleksey Zelenin, Chairman of the Legislative Assembly of Kemerovo Oblast (2021–present), Member of the Legislative Assembly (2018–present)	Registered

== Finances ==
All sums are in rubles.

Financial Report	Source	Gorodeshtyan	Karpov	Kleyster	Seredyuk	Skvortsov
First		8,000	30,000	8,000	30,000,000	200,000
Final		1,008,000	1,730,000	2,006,267	176,735,000	200,000

== Results ==
Summary of the 6–8 September 2024 Kemerovo Oblast gubernatorial election results
Candidate	Party	Votes	%
Ilya Seredyuk (incumbent)	United Russia	949,185	78.38
Maria Gorodeshtyan	Liberal Democratic Party	86,971	7.18
Aleksandr Karpov	Communist Party	71,770	5.93
Yury Skvortsov	A Just Russia – For Truth	59,699	4.93
Roman Kleyster	New People	36,034	2.98
Valid votes		1,203,659	99.40
Blank ballots		7,281	0.60
Total		1,210,940	100.00
Turnout		1,210,940	63.86
Registered voters		1,896,365	100.00

Governor Seredyuk re-appointed incumbent Senator Aleksei Sinitsyn (United Russia) to the Federation Council.

== See also ==
- 2024 Russian regional elections
