= 2023 Kemerovo Oblast Legislative Assembly election =

2023 Russian election

| ← 2018 | 8–10 September 2023 | 2028 → |
- Turnout: 80.70%
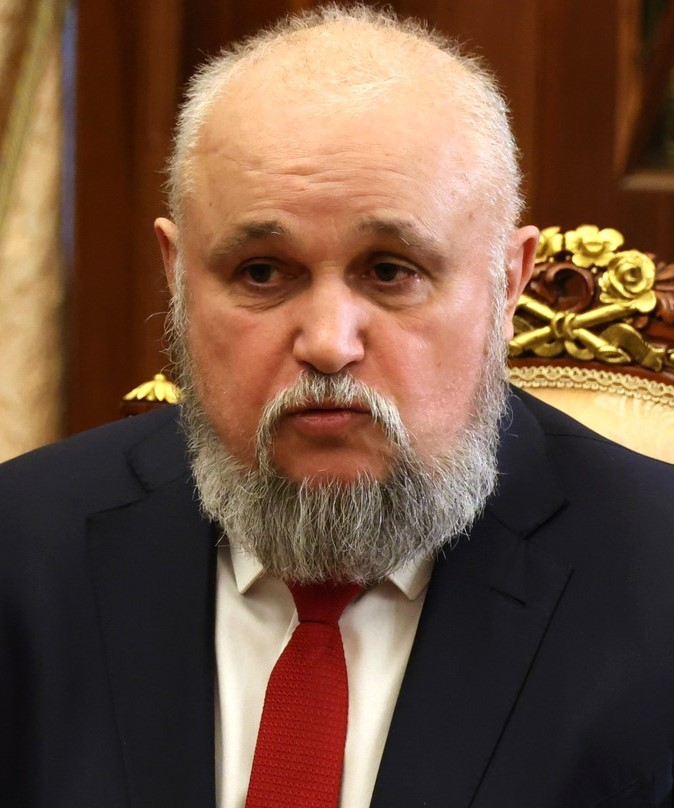

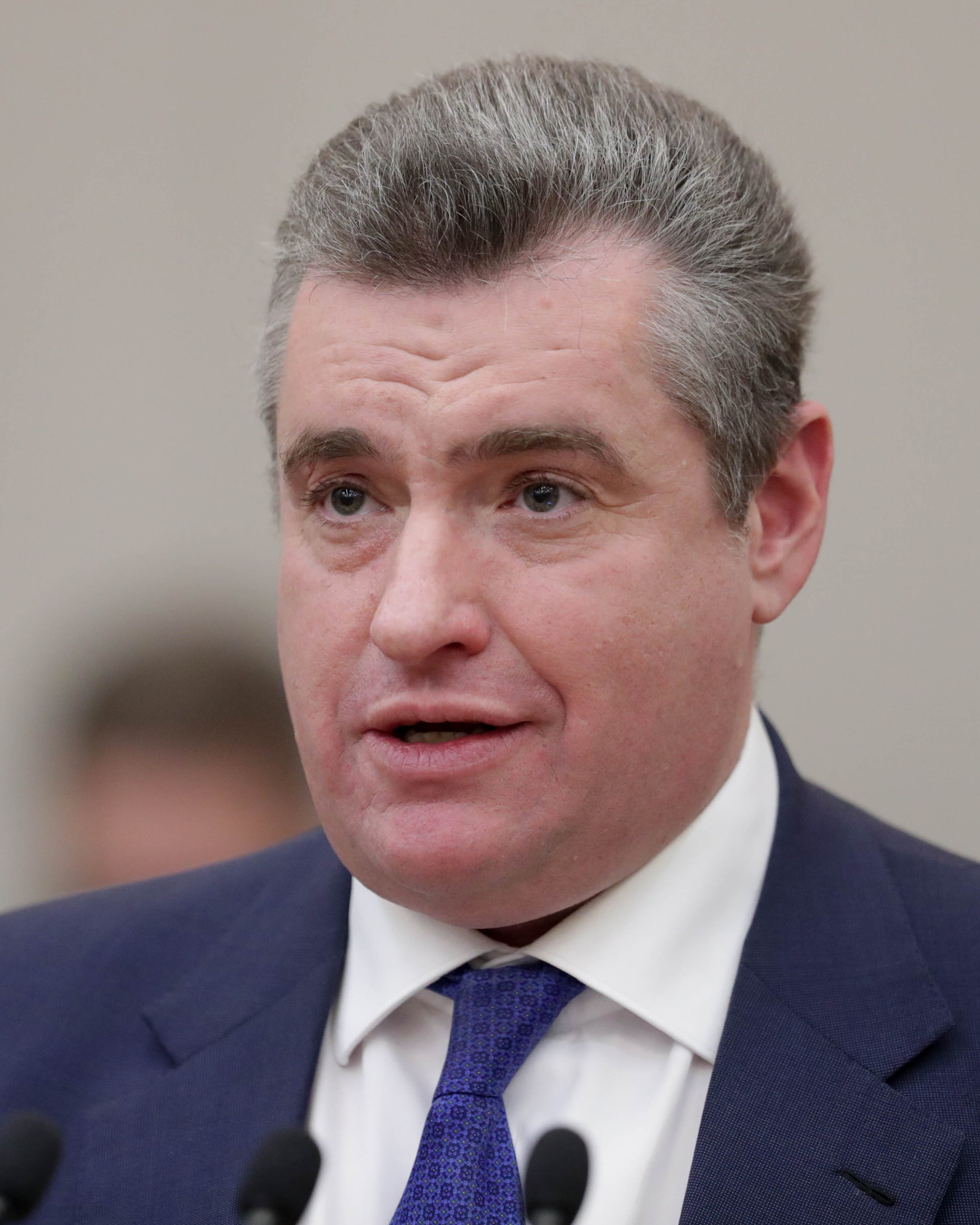
| | Majority party | Minority party | Third party |
|---|---|---|---|
| | | | CPRF |
| Candidate | Sergey Tsivilyov | Leonid Slutsky | Nikolay Mukhin |
| Leader | Dmitry Medvedev | Leonid Slutsky | Gennady Zyuganov |
| Party | United Russia | LDPR | CPRF |
| Last election | 39 seats, 64.31% | 2 seats, 10.10% | 2 seats, 10.07% |
| Seats won | 40 | 2 | 2 |
| Seat change | ▲1 | Steady | Steady |
| Popular vote | 1,071,349 | 143,508 | 136,832 |
| Percentage | 69.42% | 9.30% | 8.87% |
| Swing | ▲5.11% | ▼0.80% | ▼1.20% |
| | Fourth party | Fifth party |
| | SR-ZP | NL |
| Candidate | Yury Skvortsov | Roman Kleyster |
| Leader | Sergey Mironov | Aleksey Nechayev |
| Party | SR-ZP | New People |
| Last election | 2 seats, 7.87% | Did not exist |
| Seats won | 1 | 1 |
| Seat change | ▼1 | Did not exist |
| Popular vote | 83,498 | 82,703 |
| Percentage | 5.41% | 5.36% |
| Swing | ▼2.46% | Did not exist |

The 2023 Legislative Assembly of Kemerovo Oblast election took place on 8–10 September 2023, on common election day, coinciding with 2023 Kemerovo Oblast gubernatorial election. All 46 seats in the Legislative Assembly were up for reelection.

== Electoral system ==
Under current election laws, the Legislative Assembly is elected for a term of five years, with parallel voting. 23 seats are elected by party-list proportional representation with a 5% electoral threshold, with the other half elected in 23 single-member constituencies by first-past-the-post voting. Seats in the proportional part are allocated using the Imperiali quota, modified to ensure that every party list, which passes the threshold, receives at least one mandate.

== Candidates ==
=== Party lists ===
To register regional lists of candidates, parties need to collect 0.5% of signatures of all registered voters in Kemerovo Oblast.

The following parties were relieved from the necessity to collect signatures:

- United Russia
- Communist Party of the Russian Federation
- A Just Russia — Patriots — For Truth
- Liberal Democratic Party of Russia
- New People

| № | Party | Oblast-wide list | Candidates | Territorial groups | Status |
|---|---|---|---|---|---|
| 1 | United Russia | Sergey Tsivilyov | 70 | 23 | Registered |
| 2 | Communist Party | Nikolay Mukhin | 69 | 22 | Registered |
| 3 | A Just Russia – For Truth | Yury Skvortsov • Vladimir Pronin • Igor Goncharov | 81 | 23 | Registered |
| 4 | New People | Roman Kleyster | 64 | 21 | Registered |
| 5 | Liberal Democratic Party | Leonid Slutsky • Kirill Pravdin | 71 | 23 | Registered |
| | Rodina | | | | Failed the certification |

New People will take part in Kemerovo Oblast legislative election for the first time, while Patriots of Russia, who entered the legislature after the 2018 elections, had been dissolved prior (and its former regional leader Yury Skvortsov heading A Just Russia – For Truth list in the current election).

=== Single-mandate constituencies ===
23 single-mandate constituencies were formed in Kemerovo Oblast. To register candidates in single-mandate constituencies need to collect 3% of signatures of registered voters in the constituency.

Number of candidates in single-mandate constituencies
| Party | Candidates | |
| Party | Nominated | Registered |
|---|---|---|
| United Russia | 23 | 23 |
| Communist Party | 20 | 20 |
| Liberal Democratic Party | 23 | 22 |
| A Just Russia — For Truth | 21 | 20 |
| New People | 19 | 18 |
| Party of Social Protection | 1 | 0 |
| Total | 107 | 103 |

== Results ==
=== Results by party lists ===
Summary of the 8–10 September 2023 Legislative Assembly of Kemerovo Oblast election results
| Party | Party list | | | | | Constituency | | Total | |
| Party | Votes | % | ±pp | Seats | +/– | Seats | +/– | Seats | +/– |
|---|---|---|---|---|---|---|---|---|---|
| United Russia | 1,071,349 | 69.42 | ▲5.11% | 17 | ▲1 | 23 | Steady | 40 | ▲1 |
| Liberal Democratic Party | 143,508 | 9.30 | ▼0.80% | 2 | Steady | 0 | Steady | 2 | Steady |
| Communist Party | 136,832 | 8.87 | ▼1.20% | 2 | Steady | 0 | Steady | 2 | Steady |
| A Just Russia — For Truth | 83,498 | 5.41 | ▼2.46% | 1 | ▼1 | 0 | Steady | 1 | ▼1 |
| New People | 82,703 | 5.36 | New | 1 | New | 0 | New | 1 | New |
| Invalid ballots | 25,348 | 1.64 | ▼0.51% | — | — | — | — | — | — |
| Total | 1,543,238 | 100.00 | — | 23 | Steady | 23 | Steady | 46 | Steady |
| Turnout | 1,543,238 | 80.70 | ▲14.31% | — | — | — | — | — | — |
| Registered voters | 1,912,238 | 100.00 | — | — | — | — | — | — | — |

Aleksey Zelenin (United Russia) was re-elected as Chairman of the Legislative Assembly, while Kemerovo city official Nadezhda Ilyina (United Russia) was appointed to the Federation Council, replacing incumbent Senator Dmitry Kuzmin (United Russia).

=== Results in single-member constituencies ===
==== District 1 ====
Summary of the 8–10 September 2023 Legislative Assembly of Kemerovo Oblast election in District 1
| Candidate | Party | Votes | % |
|---|---|---|---|
| Mikhail Khudyakov (incumbent) | United Russia | 52,110 | 78.19% |
| Igor Aleshkovich | Liberal Democratic Party | 4,751 | 7.13% |
| Vladimir Borisov | Communist Party | 4,381 | 6.57% |
| Anna Varankina | A Just Russia — For Truth | 2,230 | 3.35% |
| Aleksey Grigoryev | New People | 1,848 | 2.77% |
| Total | | 66,644 | 100% |

==== District 2 ====
Summary of the 8–10 September 2023 Legislative Assembly of Kemerovo Oblast election in District 2
| Candidate | Party | Votes | % |
|---|---|---|---|
| Larisa Konysheva | United Russia | 56,087 | 71.87% |
| Stanislav Karpov | Liberal Democratic Party | 6,718 | 8.61% |
| Mikhail Boborykin | Communist Party | 5,609 | 7.19% |
| Irina Kovaleva | A Just Russia — For Truth | 5,181 | 6.64% |
| Natalya Trofimenko | New People | 3,230 | 4.14% |
| Total | | 78,035 | 100% |

==== District 3 ====
Summary of the 8–10 September 2023 Legislative Assembly of Kemerovo Oblast election in District 3
| Candidate | Party | Votes | % |
|---|---|---|---|
| Aleksey Zelenin (incumbent) | United Russia | 66,530 | 79.93% |
| Aleksey Gorshkov | Communist Party | 6,005 | 7.21% |
| Marina Trepp | A Just Russia — For Truth | 4,892 | 5.88% |
| Artyom Nikolayev | Liberal Democratic Party | 4,202 | 5.05% |
| Total | | 83,237 | 100% |

==== District 4 ====
Summary of the 8–10 September 2023 Legislative Assembly of Kemerovo Oblast election in District 4
| Candidate | Party | Votes | % |
|---|---|---|---|
| Andrey Ivanov | United Russia | 53,125 | 77.65% |
| Yury Kuznetsov | Liberal Democratic Party | 5,227 | 7.64% |
| Pavel Alemzhin | Communist Party | 4,984 | 7.29% |
| Andrey Voronkov | A Just Russia — For Truth | 4,113 | 6.01% |
| Total | | 68,412 | 100% |

==== District 5 ====
Summary of the 8–10 September 2023 Legislative Assembly of Kemerovo Oblast election in District 5
| Candidate | Party | Votes | % |
|---|---|---|---|
| Natalya Lazovskaya (incumbent) | United Russia | 49,562 | 65.03% |
| Yevgeny Diatdinov | Communist Party | 8,057 | 10.57% |
| Anton Afanyakin | Liberal Democratic Party | 7,802 | 10.24% |
| Sergey Sotnikov | A Just Russia — For Truth | 4,819 | 6.32% |
| Kristina Mikhaylova | New People | 4,715 | 6.19% |
| Total | | 76,213 | 100% |

==== District 6 ====
Summary of the 8–10 September 2023 Legislative Assembly of Kemerovo Oblast election in District 6
| Candidate | Party | Votes | % |
|---|---|---|---|
| Anastasia Pankova | United Russia | 40,674 | 60.83% |
| Yekaterina Gruntovaya | Communist Party | 10,277 | 15.37% |
| Alina Kravchuk | Liberal Democratic Party | 7,496 | 11.21% |
| Pyotr Tebenko | New People | 7,288 | 10.90% |
| Total | | 66,864 | 100% |

==== District 7 ====
Summary of the 8–10 September 2023 Legislative Assembly of Kemerovo Oblast election in District 7
| Candidate | Party | Votes | % |
|---|---|---|---|
| Darya Repina | United Russia | 48,289 | 65.10% |
| Ivan Utrobin | Communist Party | 7,608 | 10.26% |
| Oleg Lukyanov | Liberal Democratic Party | 7,565 | 10.20% |
| Stanislav Kolosovsky | A Just Russia — For Truth | 5,257 | 7.09% |
| Aleksey Aksenov | New People | 4,269 | 5.76% |
| Total | | 74,175 | 100% |

==== District 8 ====
Summary of the 8–10 September 2023 Legislative Assembly of Kemerovo Oblast election in District 8
| Candidate | Party | Votes | % |
|---|---|---|---|
| Konstantin Ogiy | United Russia | 58,954 | 80.99% |
| Stanislav Levchenko | Liberal Democratic Party | 6,912 | 9.50% |
| Natalya Serikova | A Just Russia — For Truth | 5,814 | 7.99% |
| Total | | 72,796 | 100% |

==== District 9 ====
Summary of the 8–10 September 2023 Legislative Assembly of Kemerovo Oblast election in District 9
| Candidate | Party | Votes | % |
|---|---|---|---|
| Marina Perekrestova | United Russia | 40,922 | 70.52% |
| Dmitry Sobolev | Liberal Democratic Party | 6,625 | 11.42% |
| Yevgeny Kulebakin | A Just Russia — For Truth | 4,520 | 7.79% |
| Yelizaveta Kleyster | New People | 3,584 | 6.18% |
| Total | | 58,033 | 100% |

==== District 10 ====
Summary of the 8–10 September 2023 Legislative Assembly of Kemerovo Oblast election in District 10
| Candidate | Party | Votes | % |
|---|---|---|---|
| Vladimir Melnik | United Russia | 55,076 | 70.78% |
| Nikolay Vitkovsky | Communist Party | 6,575 | 8.45% |
| Svetlana Kharitonova | A Just Russia — For Truth | 5,989 | 7.70% |
| Rostislav Isayev | Liberal Democratic Party | 5,430 | 6.98% |
| Maksim Kharitokhin | New People | 3,606 | 4.63% |
| Total | | 77,812 | 100% |

==== District 11 ====
Summary of the 8–10 September 2023 Legislative Assembly of Kemerovo Oblast election in District 11
| Candidate | Party | Votes | % |
|---|---|---|---|
| Konstantin Dotsenko (incumbent) | United Russia | 49,277 | 79.10% |
| Olesya Terzitskaya | Communist Party | 3,425 | 5.50% |
| Zaven Kazaryan | Liberal Democratic Party | 3,223 | 5.17% |
| Tatyana Likhanova | New People | 2,724 | 4.37% |
| Yevgeny Kostrov | A Just Russia — For Truth | 2,499 | 4.01% |
| Total | | 62,295 | 100% |

==== District 12 ====
Summary of the 8–10 September 2023 Legislative Assembly of Kemerovo Oblast election in District 12
| Candidate | Party | Votes | % |
|---|---|---|---|
| Nikolay Priyezzhev (incumbent) | United Russia | 53,071 | 69.75% |
| Aleksandr Karpov | Communist Party | 6,874 | 9.03% |
| Nikolay Petrukhnenko | Liberal Democratic Party | 6,172 | 8.11% |
| Tatyana Ageyeva | New People | 4,491 | 5.90% |
| Anna Govyazova | A Just Russia — For Truth | 4,247 | 5.58% |
| Total | | 53,071 | 100% |

==== District 13 ====
Summary of the 8–10 September 2023 Legislative Assembly of Kemerovo Oblast election in District 13
| Candidate | Party | Votes | % |
|---|---|---|---|
| Leonid Galkin (incumbent) | United Russia | 57,025 | 82.44% |
| Anastasia Pechenkina | A Just Russia — For Truth | 5,547 | 8.02% |
| Irina Misuns | Liberal Democratic Party | 5,541 | 8.01% |
| Total | | 69,169 | 100% |

==== District 14 ====
Summary of the 8–10 September 2023 Legislative Assembly of Kemerovo Oblast election in District 14
| Candidate | Party | Votes | % |
|---|---|---|---|
| Kirill Tsvenger | United Russia | 43,828 | 68.99% |
| Svetlana Knysh | Communist Party | 6,066 | 9.55% |
| Aleksandr Trufakin | Liberal Democratic Party | 5,242 | 8.25% |
| Vitaly Yezhov | A Just Russia — For Truth | 4,135 | 6.51% |
| Aleksandra Volf | New People | 3,337 | 5.25% |
| Total | | 63,531 | 100% |

==== District 15 ====
Summary of the 8–10 September 2023 Legislative Assembly of Kemerovo Oblast election in District 15
| Candidate | Party | Votes | % |
|---|---|---|---|
| Aleksey Filimonov (incumbent) | United Russia | 47,527 | 76.80% |
| Natalya Abdullina | Communist Party | 5,036 | 8.14% |
| Konstantin Maksyutov | Liberal Democratic Party | 5,018 | 8.11% |
| Olesya Ustinova | New People | 3,411 | 5.51% |
| Total | | 61,887 | 100% |

==== District 16 ====
Summary of the 8–10 September 2023 Legislative Assembly of Kemerovo Oblast election in District 16
| Candidate | Party | Votes | % |
|---|---|---|---|
| Dmitry Yankin | United Russia | 36,239 | 63.06% |
| Andrey Kuznetsov | Communist Party | 11,831 | 20.59% |
| Roman Rolev | New People | 7,942 | 13.82% |
| Total | | 57,464 | 100% |

==== District 17 ====
Summary of the 8–10 September 2023 Legislative Assembly of Kemerovo Oblast election in District 17
| Candidate | Party | Votes | % |
|---|---|---|---|
| Natalya Ivanova | United Russia | 40,659 | 73.26% |
| Natalya Lobykina | Liberal Democratic Party | 4,318 | 7.78% |
| Andrey Gorshkov | Communist Party | 3,940 | 7.10% |
| Tatyana Protas | A Just Russia — For Truth | 3,330 | 6.00% |
| Anton Strelnikov | New People | 2,371 | 4.27% |
| Total | | 55,501 | 100% |

==== District 18 ====
Summary of the 8–10 September 2023 Legislative Assembly of Kemerovo Oblast election in District 18
| Candidate | Party | Votes | % |
|---|---|---|---|
| Nikita Varfolomeyev (incumbent) | United Russia | 34,517 | 64.07% |
| Maria Gorodeshtyan | Liberal Democratic Party | 6,869 | 12.75% |
| Artyom Nogikh | Communist Party | 5,519 | 10.24% |
| Sergey Rozhkov | A Just Russia — For Truth | 3,226 | 5.99% |
| Andrey Murylev | New People | 2,408 | 4.47% |
| Total | | 53,874 | 100% |

==== District 19 ====
Summary of the 8–10 September 2023 Legislative Assembly of Kemerovo Oblast election in District 19
| Candidate | Party | Votes | % |
|---|---|---|---|
| Kirill Yermakov | United Russia | 34,801 | 65.10% |
| Yaroslav Rudnichenko | Liberal Democratic Party | 5,254 | 9.83% |
| Irina Zaytseva | A Just Russia — For Truth | 4,802 | 8.98% |
| Galina Sidorova | Communist Party | 4,198 | 7.85% |
| Dmitry Fedoseyev | New People | 3,247 | 6.07% |
| Total | | 53,455 | 100% |

==== District 20 ====
Summary of the 8–10 September 2023 Legislative Assembly of Kemerovo Oblast election in District 20
| Candidate | Party | Votes | % |
|---|---|---|---|
| Andrey Eyrich (incumbent) | United Russia | 34,616 | 64.22% |
| Oleg Tereskov | Liberal Democratic Party | 6,098 | 11.31% |
| Leonid Burakov | Communist Party | 5,403 | 10.02% |
| Alisa Vozdvizhenskaya | A Just Russia — For Truth | 3,546 | 6.58% |
| Tatyana Lizogub | New People | 3,063 | 5.68% |
| Total | | 53,901 | 100% |

==== District 21 ====
Summary of the 8–10 September 2023 Legislative Assembly of Kemerovo Oblast election in District 21
| Candidate | Party | Votes | % |
|---|---|---|---|
| Andrey Denyakin (incumbent) | United Russia | 46,239 | 70.07% |
| Anastasia Akbaraliyeva | Liberal Democratic Party | 7,289 | 11.05% |
| Nikolay Kochetkov | Communist Party | 5,004 | 7.58% |
| Yelena Vorobyeva | A Just Russia — For Truth | 3,666 | 5.56% |
| Olga Nuzhdova | New People | 2,676 | 4.06% |
| Total | | 65,987 | 100% |

==== District 22 ====
Summary of the 8–10 September 2023 Legislative Assembly of Kemerovo Oblast election in District 22
| Candidate | Party | Votes | % |
|---|---|---|---|
| Sergey Zamyshlyayev | United Russia | 49,495 | 69.28% |
| Ruslan Lobykin | Liberal Democratic Party | 6,379 | 8.93% |
| Sergey Brednev | Communist Party | 6,285 | 8.80% |
| Veronika Absinskaya | A Just Russia — For Truth | 4,012 | 5.62% |
| Anna Maslennikova | New People | 3,882 | 5.43% |
| Total | | 71,438 | 100% |

==== District 23 ====
Summary of the 8–10 September 2023 Legislative Assembly of Kemerovo Oblast election in District 23
| Candidate | Party | Votes | % |
|---|---|---|---|
| Dmitry Kozlov | United Russia | 45,626 | 72.55% |
| Anastasia Selezneva | Liberal Democratic Party | 6,895 | 10.96% |
| Anna Cherepovskaya | A Just Russia — For Truth | 5,067 | 8.06% |
| Marina Kosareva | Communist Party | 4,491 | 7.14% |
| Total | | 62,890 | 100% |

== See also ==
- 2023 Russian regional elections
