= 2023 Kemerovo Oblast gubernatorial election =

← 2018	8–10 September 2023	2024 →
- Turnout: 80.73%
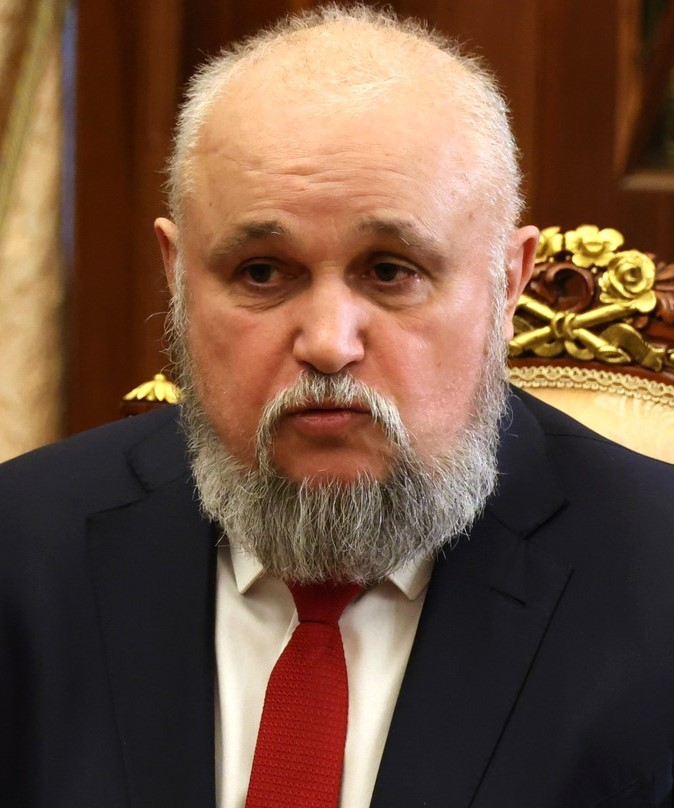
		CPRF
Candidate	Sergey Tsivilyov	Yekaterina Gruntovaya
Party	United Russia	CPRF
Popular vote	1,315,922	78,303
Percentage	85.23%	5.07%
Governor before election
Sergey Tsivilyov
United Russia
Elected Governor
Sergey Tsivilyov
United Russia

The 2023 Kemerovo Oblast gubernatorial election took place on 8–10 September 2023, on common election day, coinciding with the Legislative Assembly of Kemerovo Oblast election. Incumbent Governor Sergey Tsivilyov was re-elected to a second term in office.

== Background ==
Governor of Kemerovo Oblast Aman Tuleyev served as head of the region for 21 years – from 1997 to 2018 – during his rule consolidating Kuzbass political and economic resources. Tuleyev resigned from the post on 1 April 2018 after a deadly fire in Kemerovo shopping mall, which led to 60 casualties. Sergey Tsivilyov, a coal mining businessman, who was appointed Deputy Governor less than 2 months prior, was elevated to the gubernatorial position. In September 2018 Tsiviyov easily won election for a full term with 81.3% of the vote.

Sergey Tsivilyov held solid ratings during his term and was even rumoured to be considered for higher office – Presidential Envoy to the Siberian Federal District or Minister of Energy. In April 2023 Tsivilyov publicly announced his intention to run to a second term as governor.

== Candidates ==
In Kemerovo Oblast candidates for Governor can be nominated only by registered political parties, self-nomination is not possible. However, candidates are not obliged to be members of the nominating party. Candidate for Governor of Kemerovo Oblast should be a Russian citizen and at least 30 years old. Candidates for Governor should not have a foreign citizenship or residence permit. Each candidate in order to be registered is required to collect at least 8% of signatures of members and heads of municipalities. Also gubernatorial candidates present 3 candidacies to the Federation Council and election winner later appoints one of the presented candidates.

=== Registered ===
- Yekaterina Gruntovaya (CPRF), Member of Legislative Assembly of Kemerovo Oblast (2018–present)
- Stanislav Karpov (LDPR), Member of Legislative Duma of Tomsk Oblast (2021–present), former Member of Legislative Assembly of Kemerovo Oblast (2018–2020)
- Yury Skvortsov (SR–ZP), Deputy Chairman of the Legislative Assembly of Kemerovo Oblast (2018–present), 2015 and 2018 Patriots of Russia gubernatorial candidate
- Sergey Tsivilyov (United Russia), incumbent Governor of Kemerovo Oblast (2018–present)

=== Candidates for Federation Council ===
- Sergey Tsivilyov (United Russia):
  - Nadezhda Ilyina, Charwoman of the Kemerovo Committee of Housing
  - Nikolay Senchurov, former Chairman of the Kemerovo City Council of People's Deputies (2016–2021)
  - Aleksei Sinitsyn, incumbent Senator from Kemerovo Oblast (2018–present)

== Results ==
Summary of the 8–10 September 2023 Kemerovo Oblast gubernatorial election results
Candidate	Party	Votes	%
Sergey Tsivilyov (incumbent)	United Russia	1,315,922	85.23
Yekaterina Gruntovaya	Communist Party	78,303	5.07
Stanislav Karpov	Liberal Democratic Party	70,311	4.55
Yury Skvortsov	A Just Russia — For Truth	55,022	3.56
Valid votes		1,519,558	98.42
Blank ballots		24,325	1.58
Total		1,543,883	100.00
Turnout		1,543,883	80.73
Registered voters		1,912,342	100.00

Governor Tsivilyov re-appointed incumbent Senator Aleksei Sinitsyn to the Federation Council.

== See also ==
- 2023 Russian regional elections
