= 2022 Kemerovo nursing home fire =

Fire in Russia

- Location within Russia
- Date: 23 December 2022
- Time: until 23:45 (KRAT, UTC+07:00)
- Location: Tavricheskaya Street, Kemerovo, Kemerovo Oblast, Russia; 55°18′23″N 86°02′20″E
- Cause: (preliminary) Faulty or misused furnace
- Deaths: 22
- Injuries: 6

On the evening of 23 December 2022, a private house operating as an unauthorised nursing home caught fire in Kemerovo, Russia, killing 22 people and injuring six.

== Background ==
In 2021, the Ministry of Emergency Situations proposed introducing a special registry for nursing homes and hospices after a series of fires in Saint Petersburg, Moscow, Krasnogorsk, Moscow Oblast, the village of Ishbuldino in Bashkortostan, and the village of Borovsky, Tyumen Oblast.

In January 2021, the Golden Time boarding house in Kharkiv, Ukraine, burned down, killing 15 people.

== Fire ==
The fire occurred on the evening of 23 December on Tavricheskaya Street in Kemerovo, covering an area of 180 square metres (1,900 sq ft). The fire was rated as 'increased difficulty'.

TASS, citing emergency services, reported that the cause of the fire may have been a malfunctioning furnace. "A private residential building was adapted for the elderly. There was stove heating. According to preliminary data, it was the improper operation of the stove that caused the fire," the source said. However, an Interfax source suggested that the cause could have been a malfunction of an electric heater or faulty wiring.

RIA Novosti reported that the fire was extinguished by 23:15 local time.

== Casualties ==
Initially, four people were reported killed and two injured. The Ministry of Emergency Situations later announced that six people had died. TASS, citing emergency services, raised the count first to nine victims, and then later to 11.

As of 23 December, 20 people were confirmed dead.

== Aftermath ==
Kemerovo Oblast Governor Sergey Tsivilyov announced that all nursing homes in the city, particularly unregistered ones, would be checked by the emergency services. The Investigative Committee of Russia opened a criminal case following the fire in Kemerovo. An evangelical priest suspected of running the care home was detained.

== See also ==
- 2018 Kemerovo fire
