= Kemerovo fire =

Kemerovo fire may refer to:

- 2018 Kemerovo fire
- 2022 Kemerovo nursing home fire
