= Flower protests =

2023 Russian protests against the invasion of Ukraine

Flower protests in Russia (2023)
- Part of Protests against the Russian invasion of Ukraine
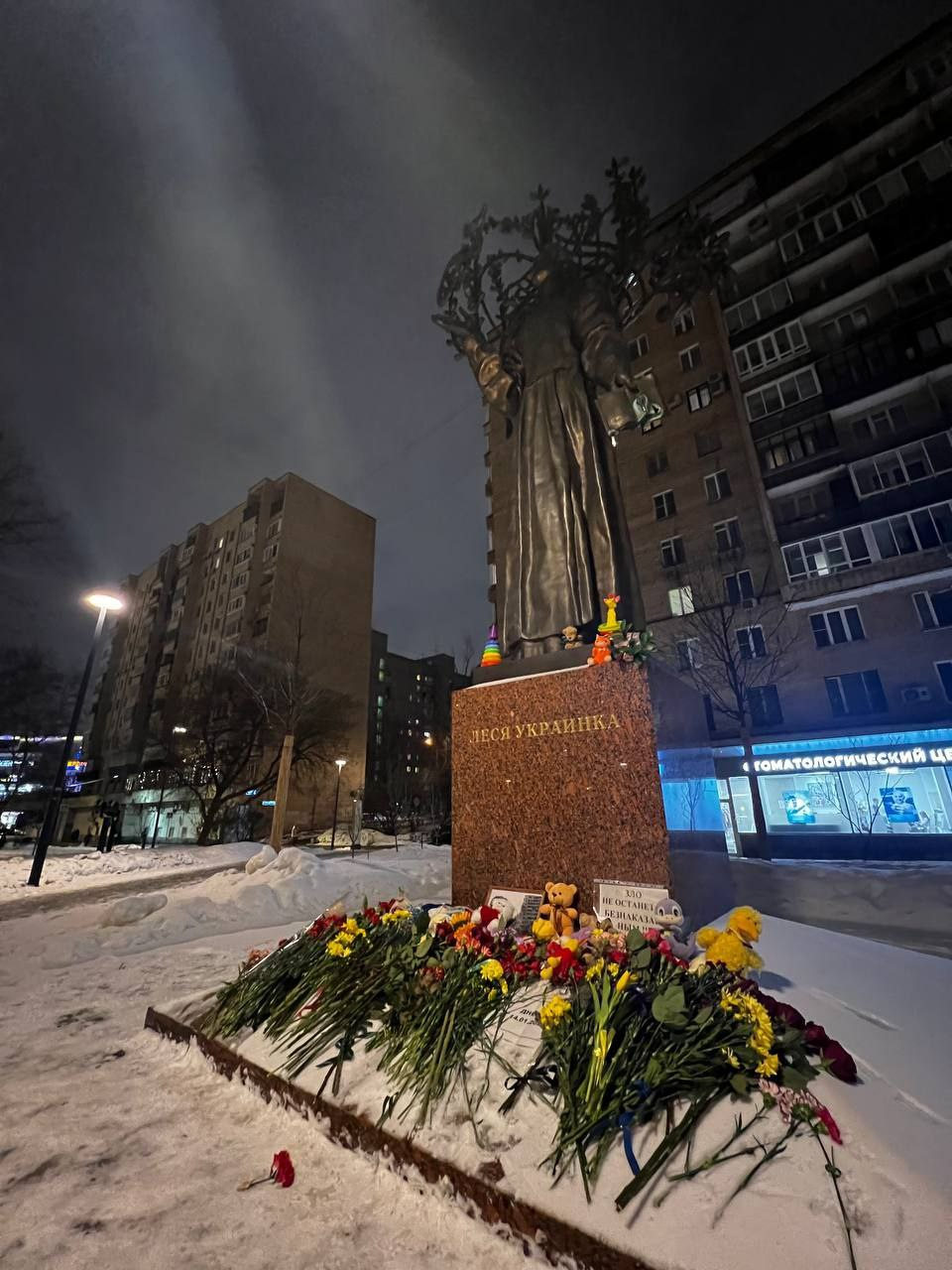
- Date: January 14, 2023 – ongoing
- Location: Russia
- Caused by: Opposition to the Russo-Ukrainian War; Opposition to the authority of Vladimir Putin
- Goals: Military withdrawal of Russia from Ukraine; Resignation of Vladimir Putin

Parties
Russian opposition	Government of Russia: Ministry of Interior; Police of Russia

Casualties
- Detained: at least 57
- Fined: 43

Flower protests in Russia are a wave of peaceful, silent protests in Russia, started in January 2023, against the Russian invasion of Ukraine. People in various cities of Russia create spontaneous memorials by laying flowers at places that are connected to Ukraine or to state violence. By May 2023, the memorials were created in at least 75 cities.

== Background ==
On February 27, 2015, Russian liberal politician and outspoken critic of Vladimir Putin, Boris Nemtsov, was shot dead on the Bolshoi Moskvoretsky Bridge. People immediately created a spontaneous memorial at the place of his death. The memorial had been maintained by volunteers for five years: people kept carrying flowers and notes. Doing so, they announced the problem right under the walls of the Kremlin: the real customers of the murder were still not convicted.

It became a Moscow tradition that has spread across all of Russia in 2018, after the Kemerovo fire, where 60 people died. Basic safety requirements were violated during the construction and operation of the building, and the Russian government delayed declaring national mourning. The horror of this story and dissatisfaction with the actions of the authorities led to the emergence of a large number of spontaneous memorials. People created spontaneous memorials in 246 Russian cities.

On February 24 2022, shortly after the Russian invasion of Ukraine started, protests against the war took place in various cities of Russia. The Russian authorities imprisoned thousands of demonstrators, and the demonstrations could not be continued on a large scale. In September 2022, there was another wave of protests in Russia caused by the military mobilization declared by Vladimir Putin. The rallies were marked by mass detentions not only of protesters, but also of ordinary passersby. Russian authorities suppressed the protests.

As Russian military progress in Ukraine slowed down around the summer of 2022, the Russian military increased its focus on using cruise missiles and drones against civilian targets in Ukraine.

Russians risk up to 10 years in prison, and in some cases, up to 15 years, for disclosing what Russia is doing in Ukraine.

== Protests ==
=== In memory of Dnipro residential building airstrike ===
On January 14, 2023, a Russian Kh-22 cruise missile hit an apartment building block in Dnipro, Ukraine, and killed at least 46 people, including 5 children, and injured another 80. Pictures of this were spread in news media and social media. Soon after, flowers appeared on the monument of Ukrainian national poet Taras Shevchenko in central St. Petersburg. In Moscow, the same thing happened next to a statue of the Ukrainian poet Larisa Kosach-Kvitka, also known by her pen name as Lesya Ukrainka, near Moscow's Kyiv Railway Station. The Russian police started removing flowers and arresting people who came to lay more flowers.

By 2 February 2023, at least 85 memorials were created in 62 cities in Russia.

At least 7 people have been detained.

The flowers people lay at the memorials are often tied together with yellow and blue ribbons. In addition to flowers, people leave there teddy bears, written notes, lit candles, pictures related to the tragedy, and other things.

The memorials´ places	The absolute number of the memorials	The percentage
Related to Ukrainian culture or Ukrainian cities	23	27%
Related to political repressions' victims	36	42%
Related to War and disaster victims	11	13%
Related to Universal values	12	14%
Religious objects	2	2%
Signs "Dnipro" in parks	1	1%

=== Anniversary of the war ===
Flower protests are a form of everyday resistance that is effective under authoritarian and totalitarian regimes. People are more willing to imitate low-risk actions. The principled public silence of the flowers laying makes it difficult to prosecute one for such actions. That is why On February 24, 2023, on the anniversary of the war, people across Russia created new spontaneous memorials and renovated the old ones that had been destroyed. A total of 83 memorials were created in 59 cities in Russia in memory of the war victims.

=== In memory of Uman missile strike ===
On the night of April 28, a Russian rocket hit a residential building in Uman, killing more than 20 people. Russian citizens started creating memorials in memory of this attack, but this time law enforcement officers decided not to allow any "flower protest" in Russia. They surrounded many potential memorial sites and kept people away from them. Memorials that had already been created have been quickly destroyed.

== Russian authorities' reaction ==
Russian authorities said that they were not aiming at civilian targets on January 14, 2023.

People who lay flowers in protest against Russian warfare, are said to breach article 280.3 in the Russian criminal code, which prohibits "public actions aimed at discrediting the use of the Russian Armed Forces".
