= Anna Tsivilyova =

Russian deputy minister of defense

- Анна Цивилёва
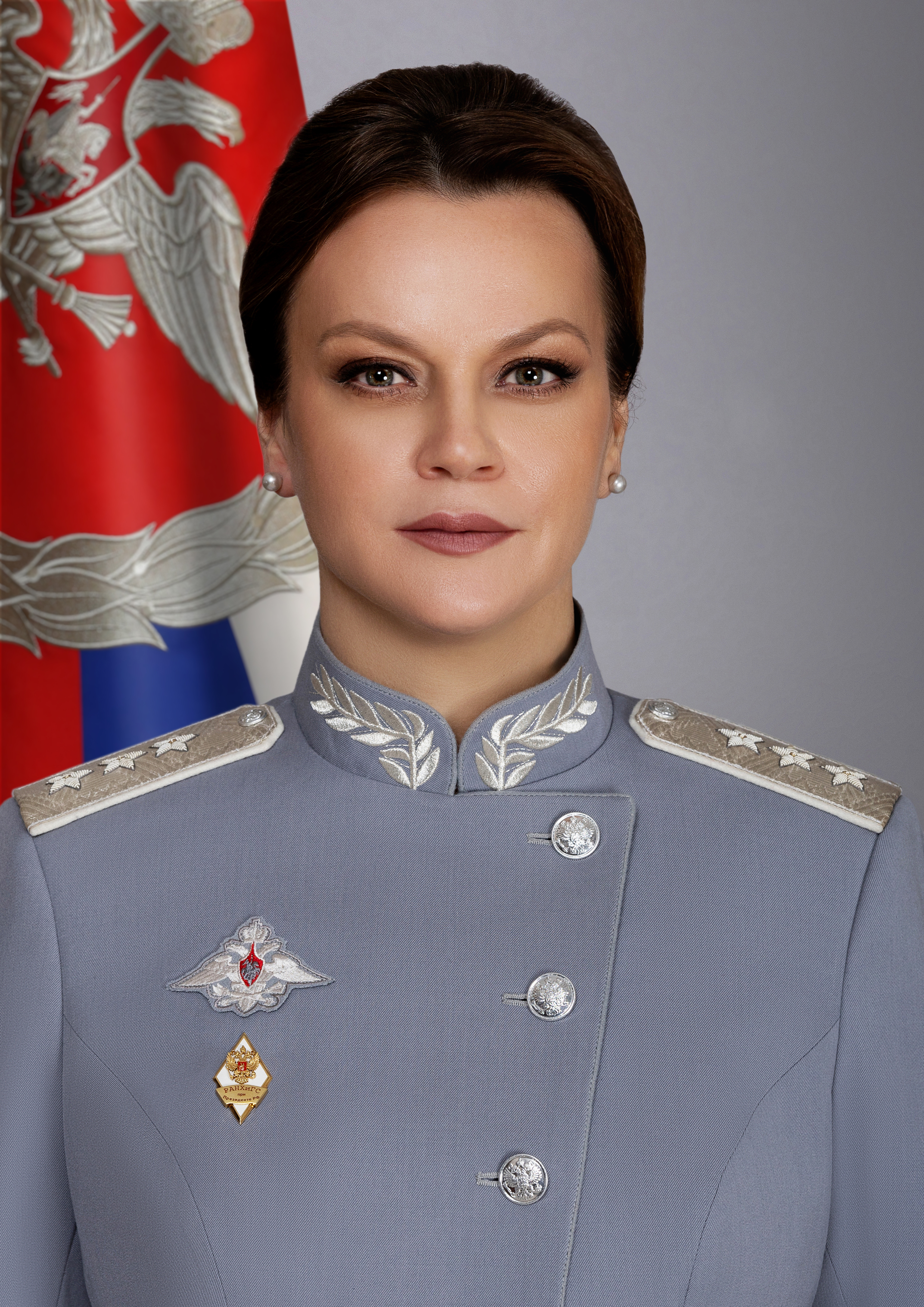
- Tsivilyova in 2026

Deputy Minister of Defence
- Incumbent
- Assumed office 14 June 2024
- Prime Minister: Mikhail Mishustin

Personal details
- Born: Anna Evgenievna Putina; 9 May 1972 (age 54) Ivanovo, RSFSR, USSR
- Spouse: Sergey Tsivilyov
- Children: 2
- Education: RUDN, RANEPA

Anna Evgenievna Tsivilyova (Russian: Анна Евгеньевна Цивилёва, née Putina [Путина]; born 9 May 1972) is a Russian government official. She is the daughter of a first cousin of president Vladimir Putin.

In 2023, Putin made her chairperson of a state fund for veterans of the Russian invasion of Ukraine. The following year, she was appointed deputy minister of defense.

== Biography ==
She was born on 9 May 1972 in Ivanovo to a family of surgeons. Her father was Yevgeny Mikhailovich Putin (1933–2024), a urologist and cousin of Vladimir Putin. She graduated from the Ivanovo State Medical Academy with a degree in psychiatry. From 1996, she worked as a psychiatrist at the Bogorodskoye Psychiatric Hospital in Ivanovo.

After Vladimir Putin became president, she moved to Moscow and began supplying medical equipment, working as a manager at the state-owned Medtekhsnab, and then at the private company Digimed.

On 3 April 2023, Putin appointed her chairperson of the newly-created State Fund for the Support of Participants in the Special Military Operation "Defenders of the Fatherland".

On 17 June 2024, she was made a deputy minister of defence. This appointment reportedly drew muted criticism within the Russian press for nepotism that "tested even Russian tolerance for corrupt practice", according to the British Ministry of Defence On 17 August 2024, the British Ministry of Defence reported that Tsivilyova had been promoted to the position of State Secretary of the Ministry of Defence, while still maintaining her role as Deputy Defence Minister. In this new role, she is primarily responsible for the ministry's relationship with the Russian legislature and other government bodies.

== Personal life ==
Tsivileva is married to Sergey Tsivilyov, a Russian energy minister and former governor of Kemerovo Oblast.

=== Sanctions ===
In 2022, following the Russian invasion of Ukraine, Tsivilyova and her coal mining corporation, JSC Kolmar Group, were placed on the United Kingdom sanctions list for having "significantly benefitted" from their relationship with Putin. The following year, Tsivilyova and the "Defenders of the Fatherland" foundation were sanctioned by the European Union.
