= Nadezhda Ilyina (politician) =

- Надежда Ильина
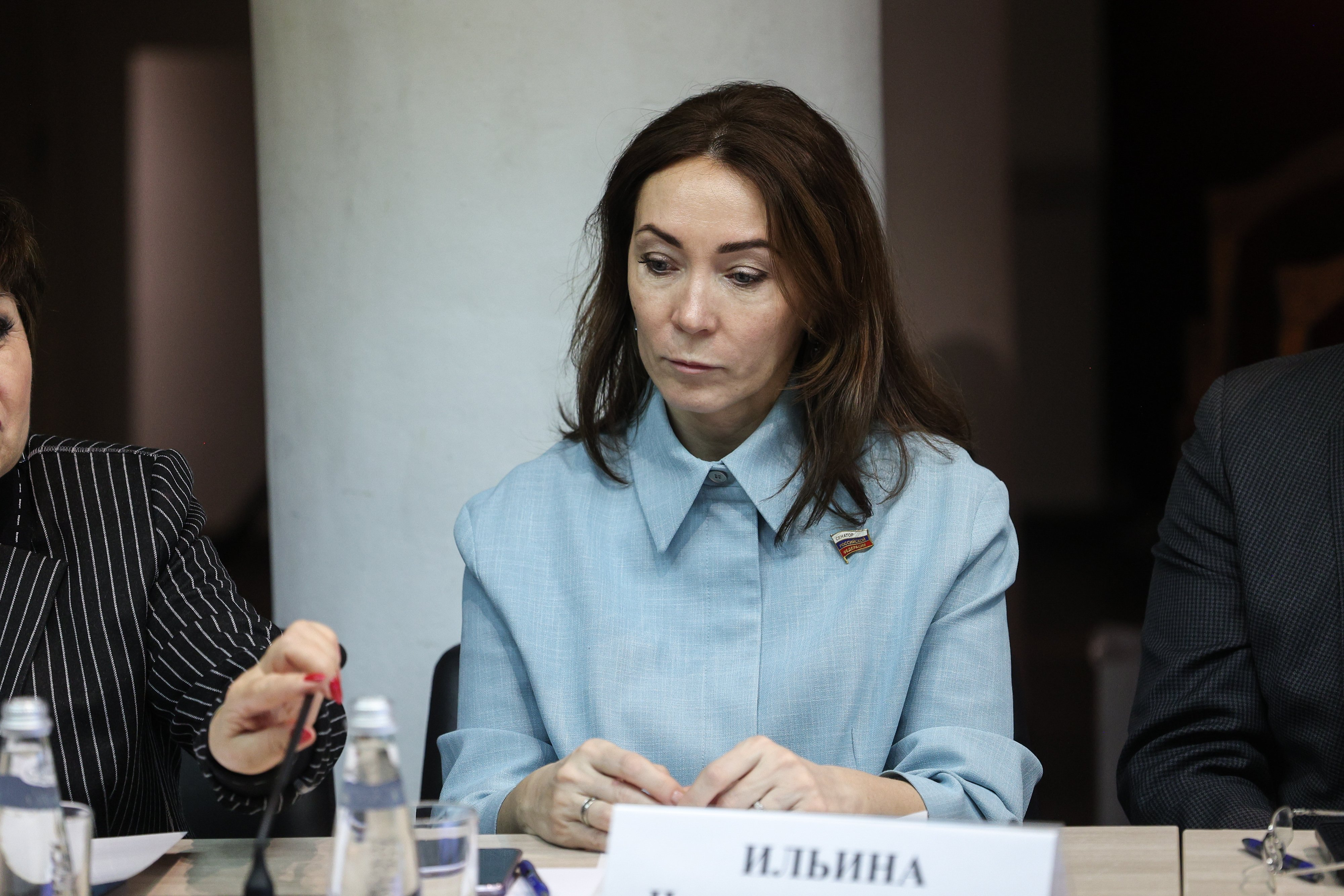

Senator from Kemerovo Oblast
- Incumbent
- Assumed office 12 September 2023
- Preceded by: Dmitry Kuzmin

Personal details
- Born: 28 November 1978 (age 47) Belomestnoye, Russia, Soviet Union
- Party: United Russia
- Education: Kemerovo State University

Nadezhda Viktorovna Ilyina (Russian: Надежда Викторовна Ильина; November 28, 1978, Kemerovo) is a Russian politician, senator of the Federation Council, and representative of the Legislative Assembly of Kemerovo Oblast in the Federation Council. She is also a member of the Federation Council Committee on Federal Structure, Regional Policy, Local Government, and Northern Affairs.

== Biography ==
Born in Kemerovo, she graduated from Kemerovo State University in 2001 with a degree in law.

She served as deputy chair of the Kemerovo City Administration's Housing Committee. Since 2014, she has served as acting chair of the committee.

From 2016 to 2023, she served as chair of the Kemerovo City Administration's Housing Committee.

She participated in the United Russia primaries to determine a candidate for the Legislative Assembly in the 10th territorial group. She was elected from United Russia Group 10.

On September 12, 2023, she was elected as a member of the Federation Council at the first meeting of the Legislative Assembly of Kemerovo Oblast. In the Federation Council, she replaced Dmitry Kuzmin. On September 29, 2023, she was granted the powers of a senator of the Federation Council.
