= Valentin Mazikin =

Russian politician (1945–2022)

- Валентин Мазикин
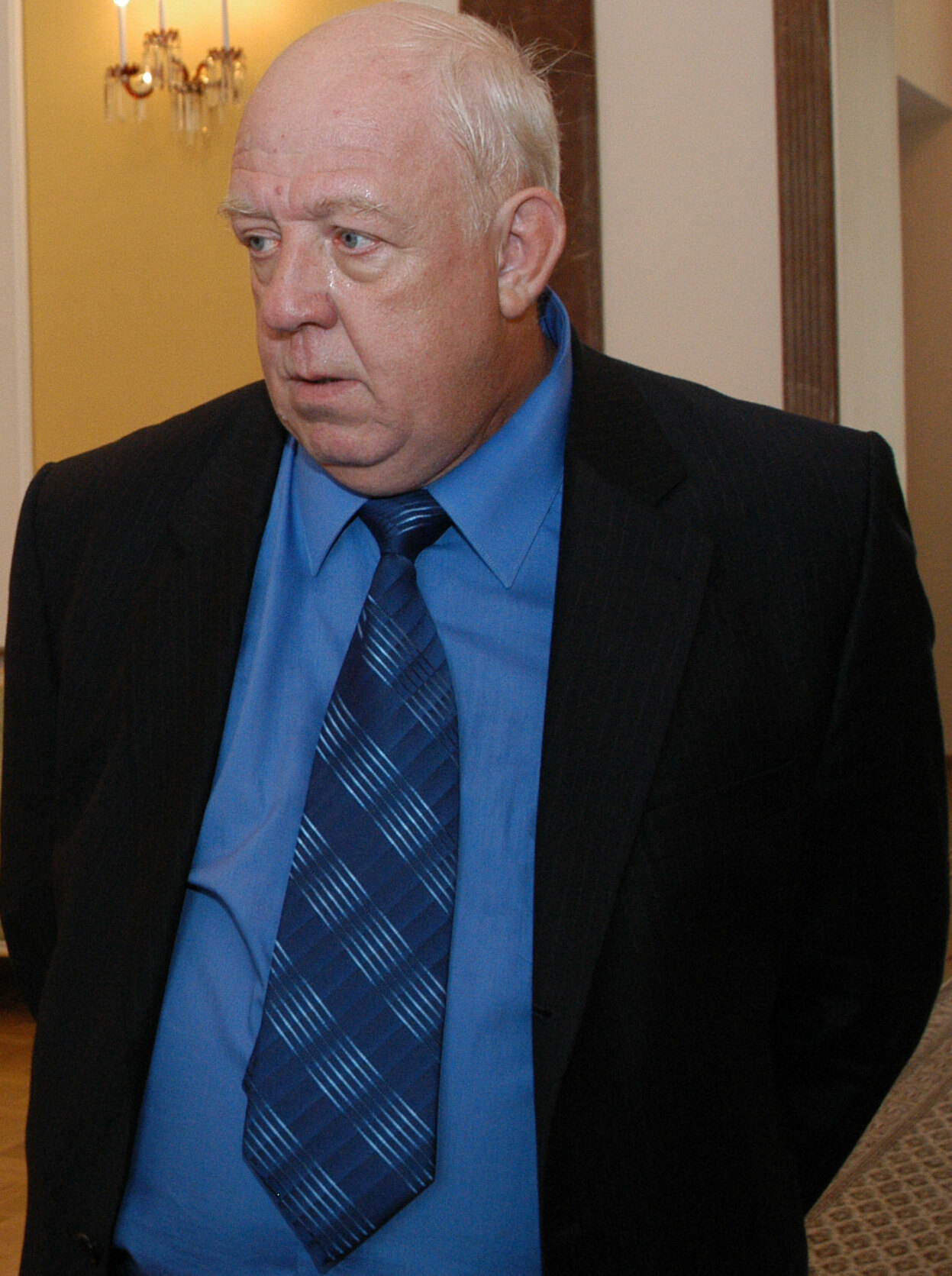
- Mazikin in 2003

Governor of Kemerovo Oblast (acting)
- In office 25 January 2001 – 4 May 2001
- Preceded by: Aman Tuleyev
- Succeeded by: Aman Tuleyev

First Deputy Governor of Kemerovo Oblast
- In office 2001 – 25 November 2013

Personal details
- Born: Valentin Petrovich Mazikin; 17 December 1945 Promyshlennaya, Kemerovo Oblast, Russian SFSR, Soviet Union
- Died: 21 January 2022 (aged 76)
- Education: Kuzbass State Technical University

Valentin Petrovich Mazikin (Russian: Валентин Петрович Мазикин; 17 December 1945 – 21 January 2022) was a Russian politician. He served as acting governor of Kemerovo Oblast from 25 January to 4 May 2001 and was then first deputy governor from 2001 to 2013. He died on 21 January 2022, at the age of 76.
