= 2015 Kazan shopping center fire =

Building fire in Kazan, Russia

Coordinates: 55.8011°N 49.0644°E

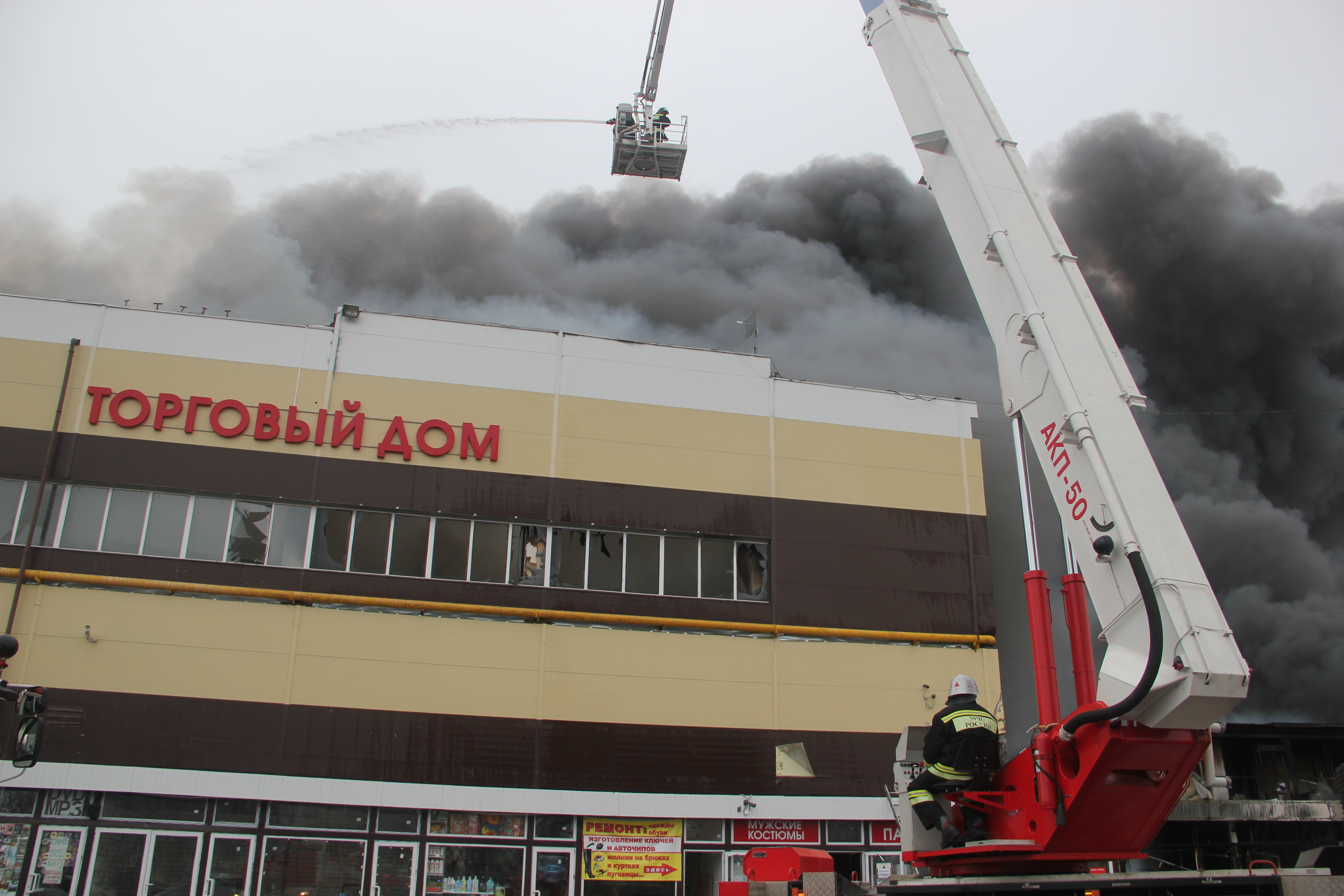
- Date: 11 March 2015
- Location: Kazan, Tatarstan, Russia
- Deaths: 17
- Injuries: 55

The 2015 Kazan shopping center fire occurred on 11 March 2015 when a fire and partial collapse of the Admiral shopping complex in the Russian city of Kazan killed at least 17 people with 55 more injured.

== Fire ==
The fire reportedly started in a first floor cafe, next to the Admiral center. Eventually, the building collapsed, trapping 25 individuals under the rubble.

A security guard initially attempted to extinguish the fire himself, and there was a delay in calling for first responders. It affected an area of 4,000 square meters (43,000 square feet).

Five hundred riot police were sent to seal off the center and create a line around the building as business owners attempted to re-enter the building and save goods. A fire train and helicopter were also used in order to get the fire under control.

== Victims ==
Kazan law enforcers reported that the number of injured by the fire had exceeded 30, with 19 people being transported to the hospital and fourteen going to the doctors or hospitals on their own choice.

On March 12 it was reported that based on reports by workers and relatives, five people were confirmed dead and 25 missing. By March 14, the number of deceased victims had risen to 15 with 17 more missing, On March 15, the final death total of 17 was released, with eight foreign nationals being identified among the dead.

== Investigation ==
Investigators detained the shopping centers director and looked into multiple theories, including arson.

Two firefighters received widespread criticism with the selfie style photo in front of the burning building, and officials were investigating whether they should be removed from their positions. The Regional Emergency Situations Department stated that the actions of the two are "not characteristic of those who work hard every day, tirelessly saving lives."

=== Criminal charges ===
A local court sanctioned the arrest of the shopping mall's chief executive on charges of fire safety regulations. The Russia Investigative Committee placed Minzilya Safina, a former bailiff, on a wanted list for failure to enforce a regional court's 2013 decision to rectify the shopping centers numerous fire safety violations.

== Response ==
Tatarstan President Rustam Minnikhanov said that managers of the center had failed to comply with fire safety regulations. He also decreed a Republic-wide day of mourning, and that the families of each Russian citizen among the victims would receive 1 million rubles (US$16,000) in compensation, and foreign victims would have the cost of transporting the remains covered.

== See also ==
- 1917 Kazan Gunpowder Plant fire
- 2018 Kemerovo fire
- Lame Horse fire
