= Dmitry Kuzmin (senator) =

Russian politician and senator (born 1975)

- Дмитрий Кузьмин
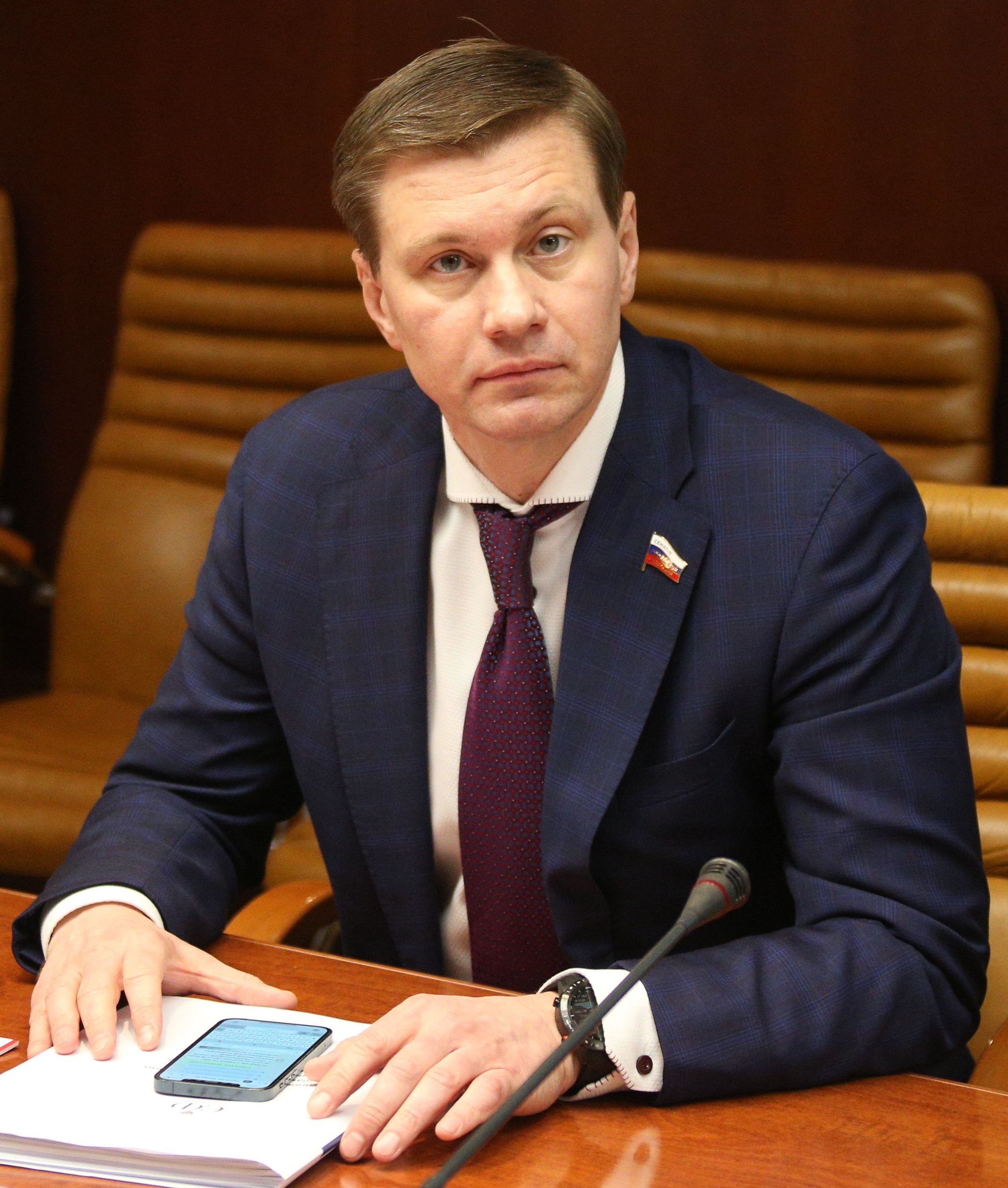

Senator from Kemerovo Oblast
- In office 14 September 2018 – 12 September 2023
- Preceded by: Sergey Shatirov
- Succeeded by: Nadezhda Ilyina

Personal details
- Born: Dmitry Kuzmin; 28 June 1975 (age 51) Beryozovsky, Kemerovo Oblast, Russian Soviet Federative Socialist Republic, Soviet Union
- Party: United Russia
- Education: Kuzbass State Technical University

Dmitry Gennadyevich Kuzmin (Russian: Дмитрий Геннадьевич Кузьмин; born 28 June 1975) is a Russian politician serving as a senator from Kemerovo Oblast since 14 September 2018.

== Biography ==
Dmitry Kuzmin was born on 28 June 1975 in Beryozovsky, Kemerovo Oblast. In 1997, he graduated from the Kuzbass State Technical University. Afterwards, he became the head of the department of an insurance company in Berezovsky. From 2000 to 2008, he was also Deputy Head of Berezovsky for Economics and Finance. He left the office to become the general director of the Energosbytovaya Kompaniya Kuzbassa and, later, the LLC "Holding company SDS-Energo". At the same time, he was a member of the local United Russia branch. On 14 September 2018, he became the senator from the Legislative Assembly of Kemerovo Oblast.

Dmitry Kuzmin is under personal sanctions introduced by the European Union, the United Kingdom, the USA, Canada, Switzerland, Australia, Ukraine, New Zealand, for ratifying the decisions of the "Treaty of Friendship, Cooperation and Mutual Assistance between the Russian Federation and the Donetsk People's Republic and between the Russian Federation and the Luhansk People's Republic" and providing political and economic support for Russia's annexation of Ukrainian territories.
