= 2023 Uman missile strike =

28 April 2023 missile strike during the Russian invasion of Ukraine

April 2023 Uman missile strike
- Part of Russian strikes against Ukrainian infrastructure (2022–present)
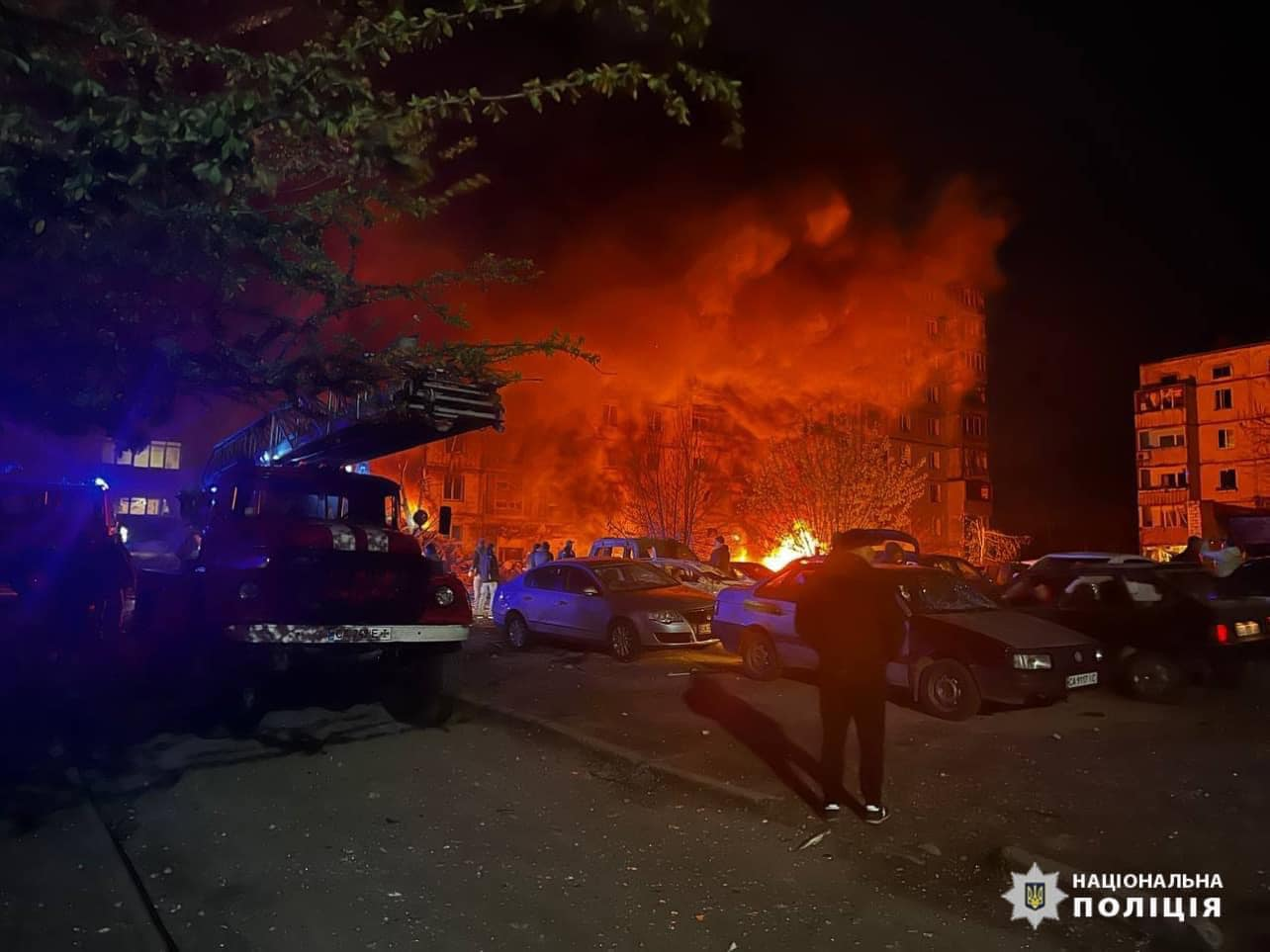
- Uman after the Russian missile strike
- Location: 48°45′55.6″N 30°12′55.4″E; Uman, Cherkasy Oblast, Ukraine
- Date: 28 April 2023; 4 a.m.
- Weapon: Kh-101/X-101 cruise missiles
- Deaths: 23
- Injuries: 9
- Perpetrator: Russian Air Force

During the night of 28 April 2023, around 4 a.m., Russia launched more than 20 Kh-101/X-101 long range missile strikes against residential buildings in Uman, Ukraine, during the Russian invasion of Ukraine. 23 civilians were killed, including three children, while nine were injured. Uman was located 200 miles away from any front line in the Russo-Ukrainian War. In one building, 27 out of 46 apartments were destroyed by the blast.

== Events ==
Russia said it was "aiming for the reserve units and used high-precision weapons" in Uman, but no military casualties were recorded among the dead. The airstrike was quickly followed by a Telegram post by the Russian Ministry of Defense of an image of a missile launch with the caption "right on target".

Since Uman is the location of Rabbi Nachman of Breslov's grave, a popular pilgrimage site for Hasidic Jews, Israel condemned this Russian attack. Ukrainian Foreign Minister Dmytro Kuleba said the bombardment shows the Kremlin does not want a peace deal. Czech President Petr Pavel, who was at the time on an official visit in Kyiv, concluded that the bombardment shows that Russia is intentionally targeting civilians in Ukraine.

Matthew Hollingworth of the United Nations Office for the Coordination of Humanitarian Affairs condemned the attack which killed civilians sleeping in their homes, in a city far from the front line.

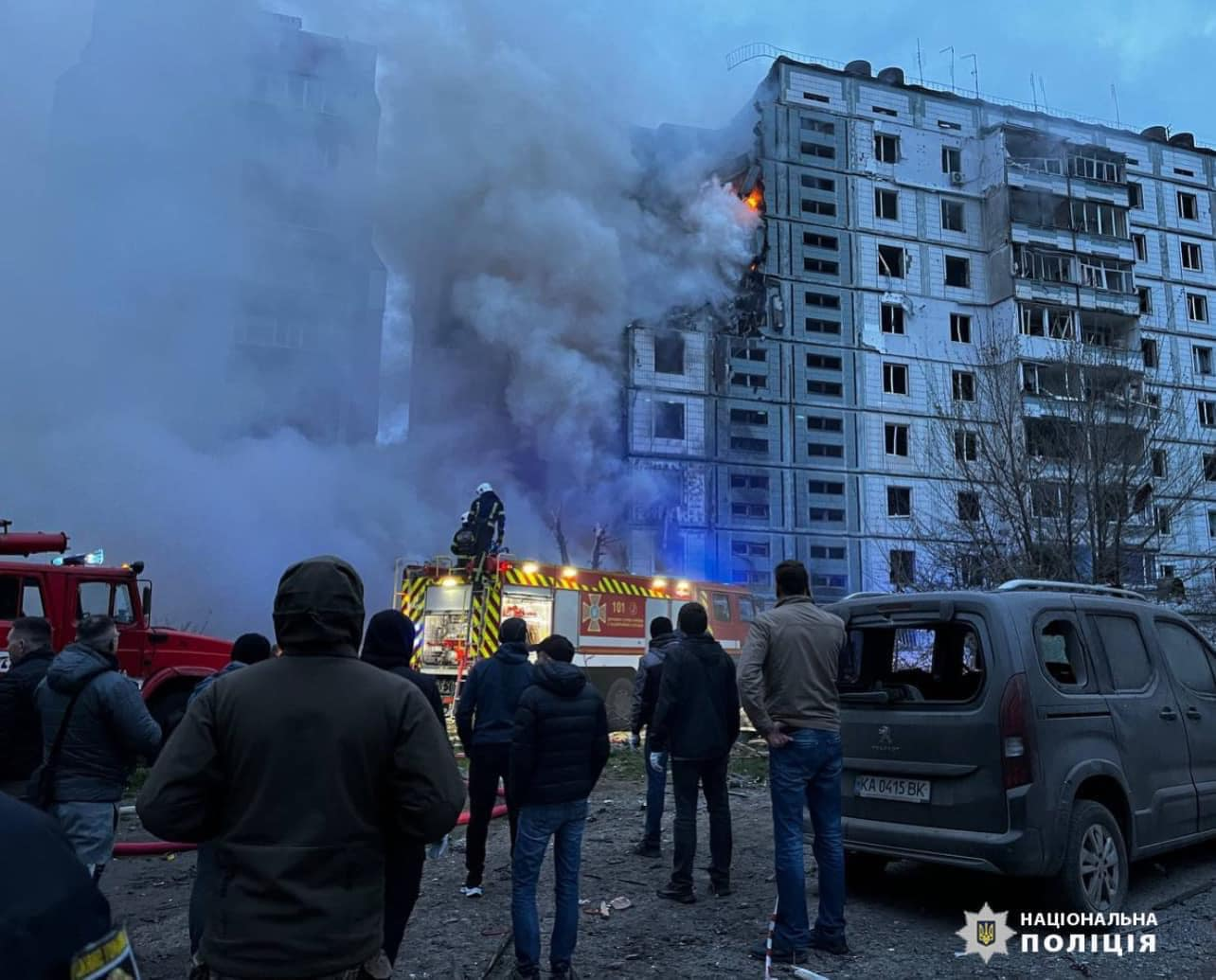

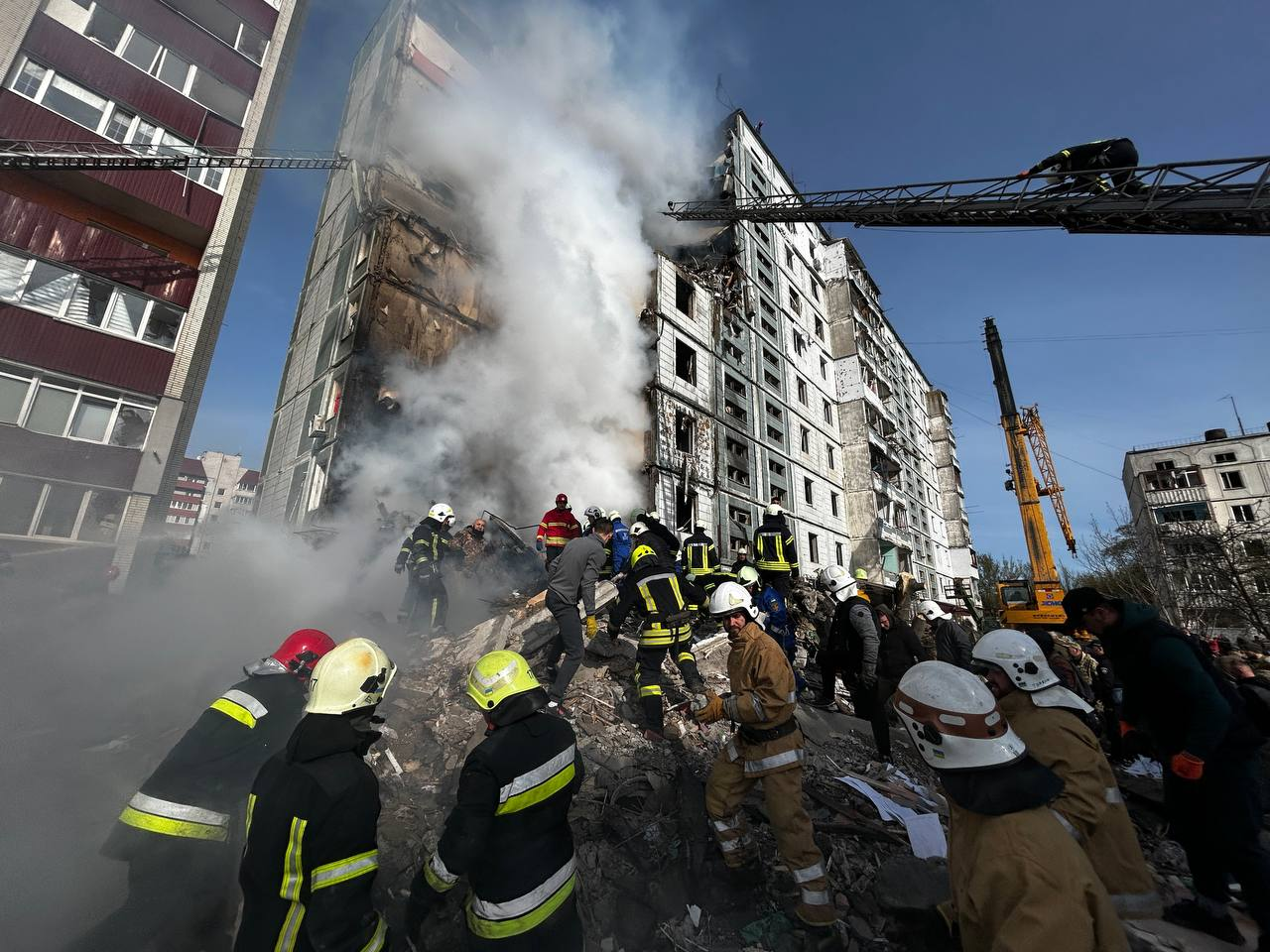

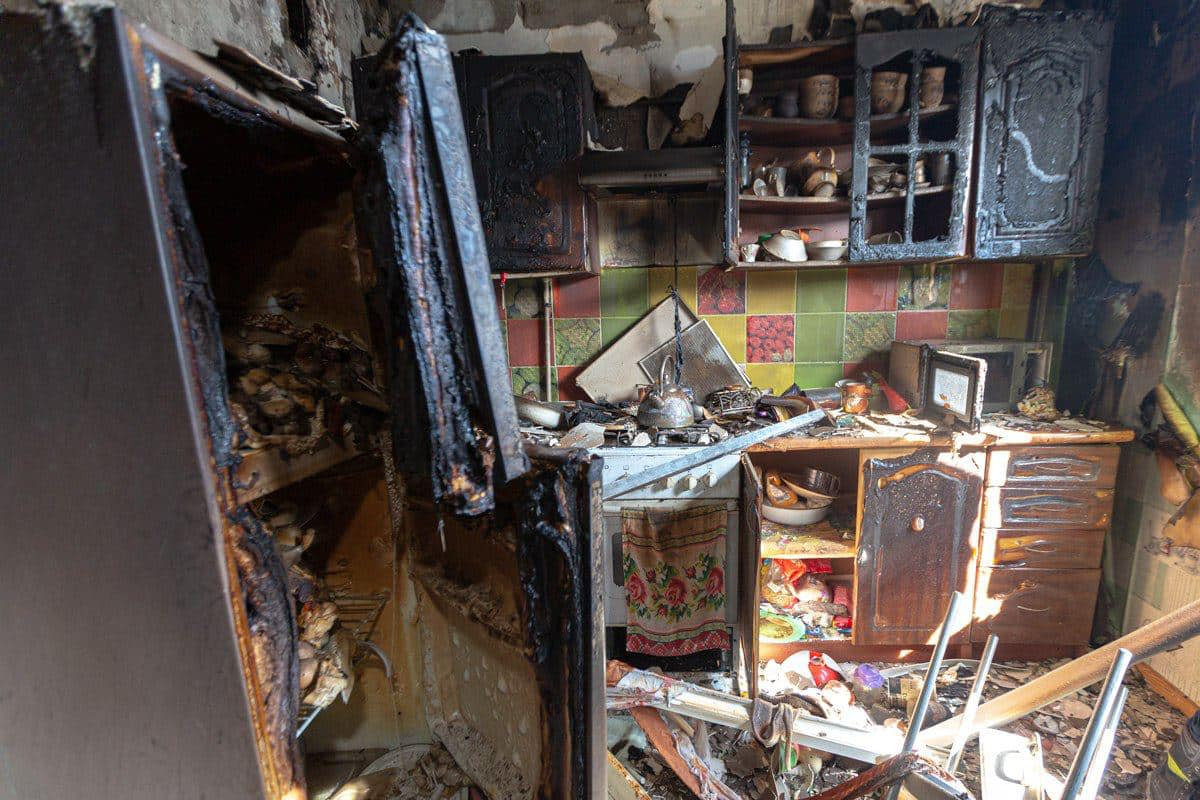

== See also ==
- April 2023 Sloviansk airstrike
- Russian war crimes
