= Ishbuldino =

Ishbuldino Ишбулдино
- Village
- Location within Bashkortostan Location within Russia
- Coordinates: 53°04′N 58°35′E
- Country: Russia
- Region: Bashkortostan
- District: Abzelilovsky District
- Time zone: UTC+5:00

Ishbuldino (Russian: Ишбулдино; Bashkir: Ишбулды, İşbuldı) is a rural locality (a village) in Khalilovsky Selsoviet, Abzelilovsky District, Bashkortostan, Russia. The population was 539 as of 2010. There are 6 streets.

== Geography ==
Ishbuldino is located 39 km south of Askarovo (the district's administrative centre) by road. Khalilovo is the nearest rural locality.
