= Governor of Kemerovo Oblast =

Highest-ranking official in Kemerovo Oblast, Russia

- Standard of the Governor of Kemerovo oblast

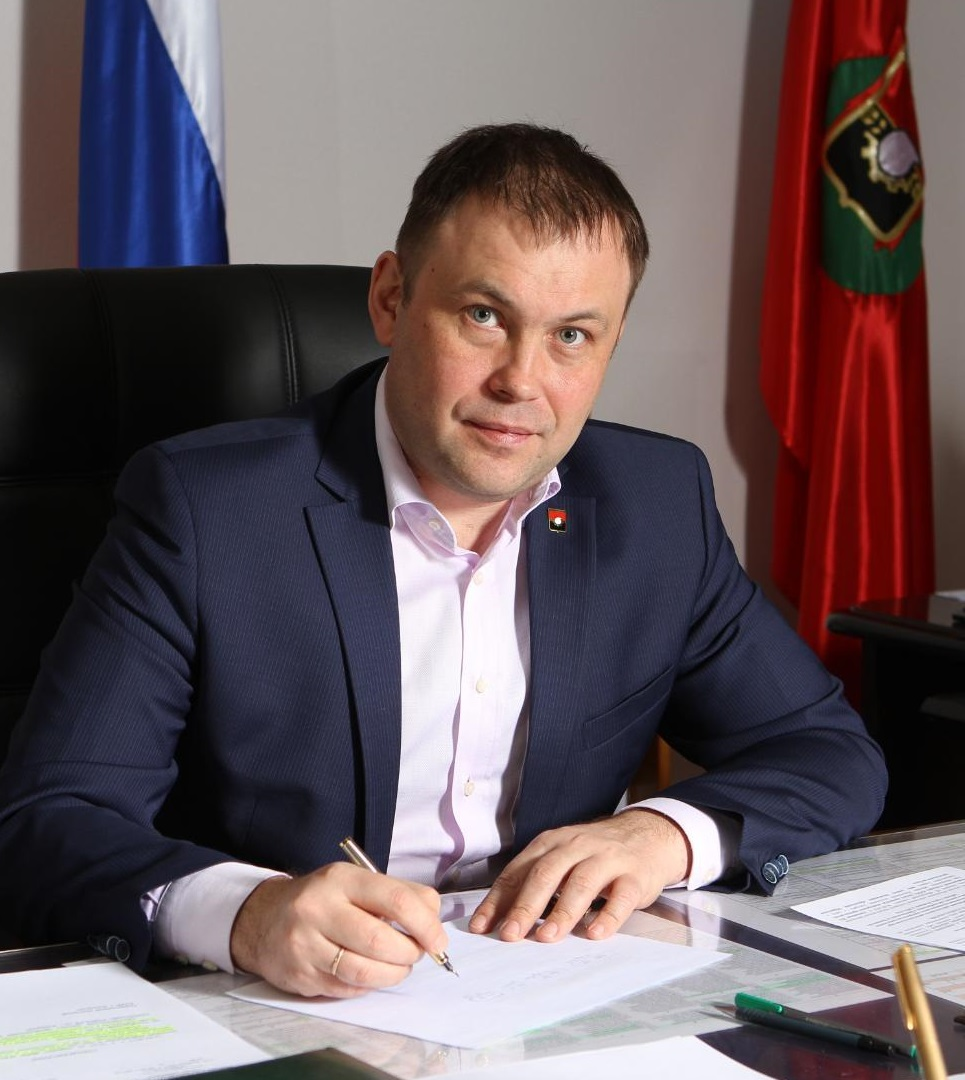
- Incumbent; Ilya Seredyuk since 12 September 2024
- Seat: Kemerovo
- Term length: 5 years
- Formation: 1991
- Website: kemobl.ru

The Governor of Kemerovo Oblast (Russian: Губернатор Кемеровской области) is the head of government of Kemerovo Oblast, a federal subject of Russia.

The position was introduced in 1991 as Head of Administration of Kemerovo Oblast and was officially renamed on 23 June 1997. The Governor is elected by direct popular vote for a term of five years.

== List of officeholders ==
#	Portrait	Governor	Tenure	Time in office	Party	Election	Ref.
1		Mikhail Kislyuk (born 1951)	27 August 1991 – 1 July 1997 (resigned)	5 years, 308 days	Independent	Appointed	
2		Aman Tuleyev (1944–2023)	1 July 1997 – 25 January 2001 (resigned)	3 years, 208 days	Independent	Appointed 1997	
—		Valentin Mazikin (1945–2022)	25 January 2001 – 4 May 2001	99 days	Independent	Acting	
(2)		Aman Tuleyev (1944–2023)	4 May 2001 – 16 April 2015 (term end)	16 years, 332 days	Independent → United Russia	2001; 2005 (Note: Appointed by the president of Russia with the consent of the Council of People's Deputies.); 2010	
—		Aman Tuleyev (1944–2023)	16 April 2015 – 22 September 2015	16 years, 332 days	Independent → United Russia	Acting	
(2)		Aman Tuleyev (1944–2023)	22 September 2015 – 1 April 2018 (resigned)	16 years, 332 days	Independent → United Russia	2015	
—		Sergey Tsivilyov (born 1961)	1 April 2018 – 17 September 2018	6 years, 43 days	United Russia	Acting	
3		Sergey Tsivilyov (born 1961)	17 September 2018 – 14 May 2024 (resigned)	6 years, 43 days	United Russia	2018; 2023	
—		Ilya Seredyuk (born 1975)	15 May 2024 – 12 September 2024	1 year, 168 days	United Russia	Acting	
4		Ilya Seredyuk (born 1975)	12 September 2024 – present	1 year, 168 days	United Russia	2024	
