= Ilya Seredyuk =

Russian politician (born 1975)

- Илья Середюк
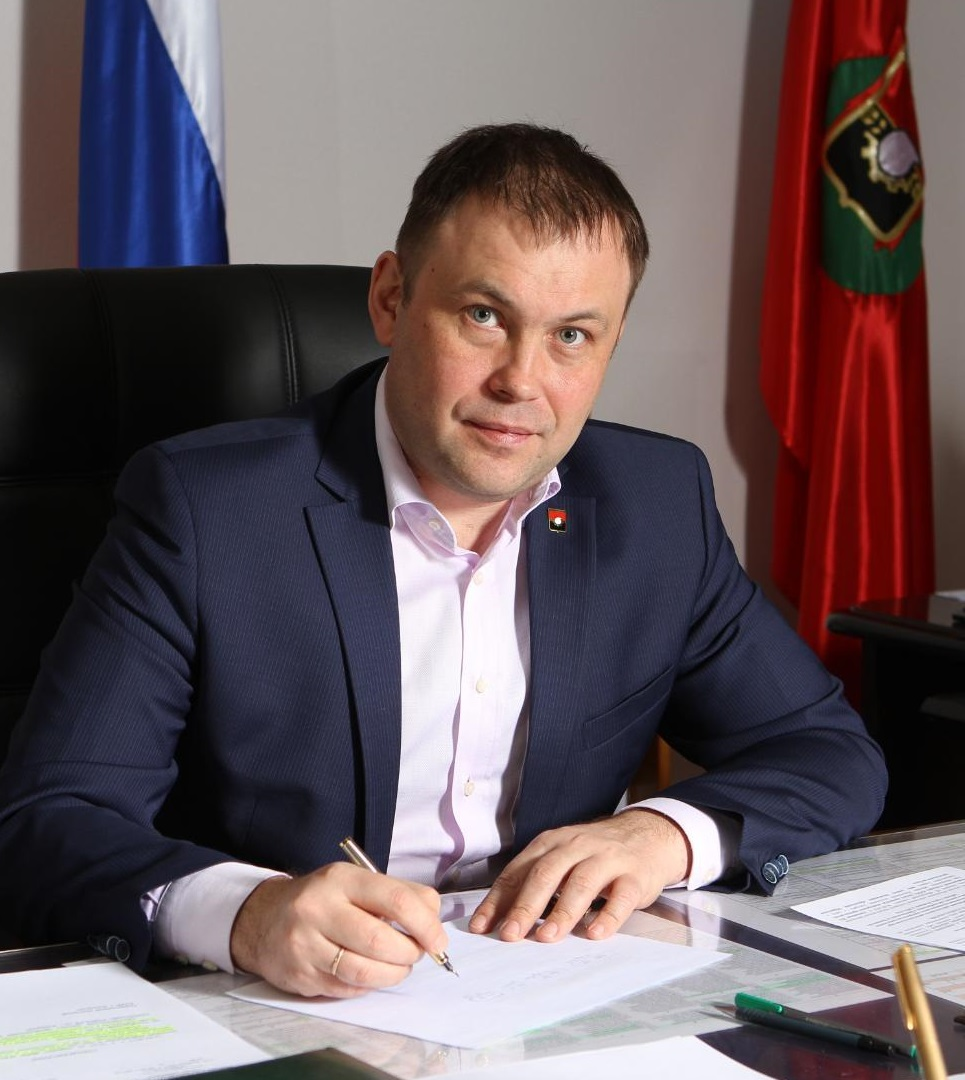
- Seredyuk in 2019

Governor of Kemerovo Oblast
- Incumbent
- Assumed office 12 September 2024; Acting: 15 May 2024 – 12 September 2024
- Preceded by: Sergey Tsivilyov

Deputy Chairman of the Government of Kemerovo Oblast
- In office 23 September 2022 – 21 May 2024
- Governor: Sergey Tsivilyov
- Preceded by: Vyacheslav Telegin
- Succeeded by: Andrey Panov

Mayor of Kemerovo
- In office 30 September 2016 – 22 September 2022
- Governor: Aman Tuleyev; Sergey Tsivilyov
- Preceded by: Valery Yermakov
- Succeeded by: Dmitry Anisimov

Personal details
- Born: Ilya Vladimirovich Seredyuk; 16 November 1975 (age 50) Kemerovo, Russian Soviet Federative Socialist Republic, Soviet Union
- Party: United Russia
- Education: Kuzbass State Technical University

Ilya Seredyuk (Russian: Илья Владимирович Середюк; born May 15, 1975) is a Russian statesman and politician. He is the current Governor of Kemerovo Oblast since September 12, 2024.

== Biography ==
Ilya Seredyuk was born in Kemerovo on 16 November 1975, into a family of teachers. His father taught at Kuzbass State Technical University, while his mother worked in a gymnasium. In 1997, Ilya Seredyuk also graduated from Kuzbass State Technical University. After that, he worked as a consultant at the Administration of Industry, Transport, and Communication of Kemerovo Oblast. In 1999, he was appointed the external manager of JSC 'Topkinsky Cement'. From 2003 to 2006, Ilya Seredyuk headed the Department of Industry and Consumer Market of the Kemerovo Administration, then became the Deputy Head for Urban Development. In 2015, he became the Deputy Governor of Kuzbass for the Agro-Industrial Complex, Natural Resources, and Ecology.

Since the spring of 2016, after Valery Ermakov left the position of Mayor of Kemerovo, Ilya Seredyuk took over the role in the status of Acting Mayor. In the fall of the same year, he was elected Mayor for the first time, being nominated by 'United Russia'. In September 2021, after the abolition of direct mayoral elections in Kuzbass in 2019, the city council approved the candidacy of Ilya Seredyuk, and he became the head of Kemerovo for a second term.

On May 15, 2024, President of Russia Vladimir Putin signed a decree appointing Ilya Seredyuk as the acting governor of Kemerovo Oblast. He succeeded Sergey Tsivilyov, who became the Minister of Energy.

== Personal life ==
He is married and has two sons and a daughter. In June 2024, Ilya Seredyuk told journalists that he had become a grandfather a year and a half earlier.
