= Aleksei Sinitzyn =

Russian politician (born 1976)

- Алексей Синицын
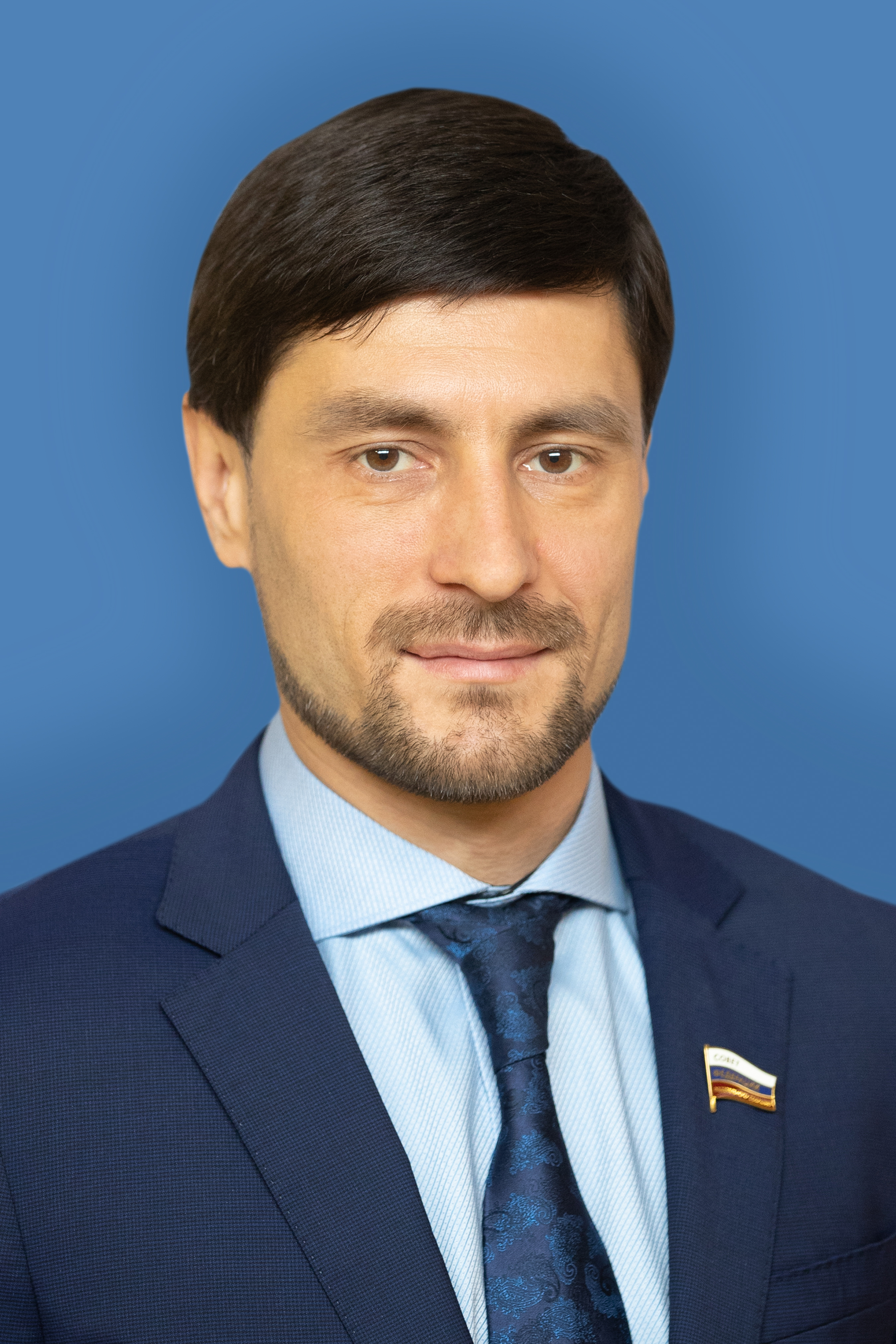

Senator from Kemerovo Oblast
- Incumbent
- Assumed office 17 September 2018
- Preceded by: Alexander Lavrik

Personal details
- Born: Aleksei Sinitzyn; 13 January 1976 (age 50) Kemerovo, Russian Soviet Federative Socialist Republic, Soviet Union
- Party: United Russia
- Education: Kemerovo State University

Aleksei Vladimirovich Sinitzyn (Russian: Алексей Владимирович Синицын; born 13 January 1976) is a Russian politician serving as a senator from Kemerovo Oblast since 17 September 2018.

== Career ==
Aleksei Sinitzyn was born on 13 January 1976 in Kemerovo, Russian Soviet Federative Socialist Republic. In 1998, he graduated from the Kemerovo State University. After graduation, Sinitzyn worked as an attorney. In 2012, he became the founder of his law office in Kemerovo. On 8 September 2013, he was elected to the Council of People's Deputies of the Kemerovo Oblast of the 4th convocation. In 2015, Sinitzyn was appointed secretary of the Kemerovo regional branch of the United Russia party. On 17 September 2018, he was appointed Senator from Kemerovo Oblast.

== Sanctions ==
Aleksei Sinitzyn is under personal sanctions introduced by the European Union, the United Kingdom, the USA, Canada, Switzerland, Australia, Ukraine, New Zealand, for ratifying the decisions of the "Treaty of Friendship, Cooperation and Mutual Assistance between the Russian Federation and the Donetsk People's Republic and between the Russian Federation and the Luhansk People's Republic" and providing political and economic support for Russia's annexation of Ukrainian territories.
