= Ministry of Energy (Russia) =

Government minister of Russia

Ministry of Energy of the Russian Federation
- Министерство энергетики Российской Федерации; Ministerstvo energetiki Rossiiskoi Federatsii
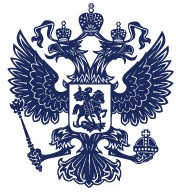
- Ministry of Energy Emblem

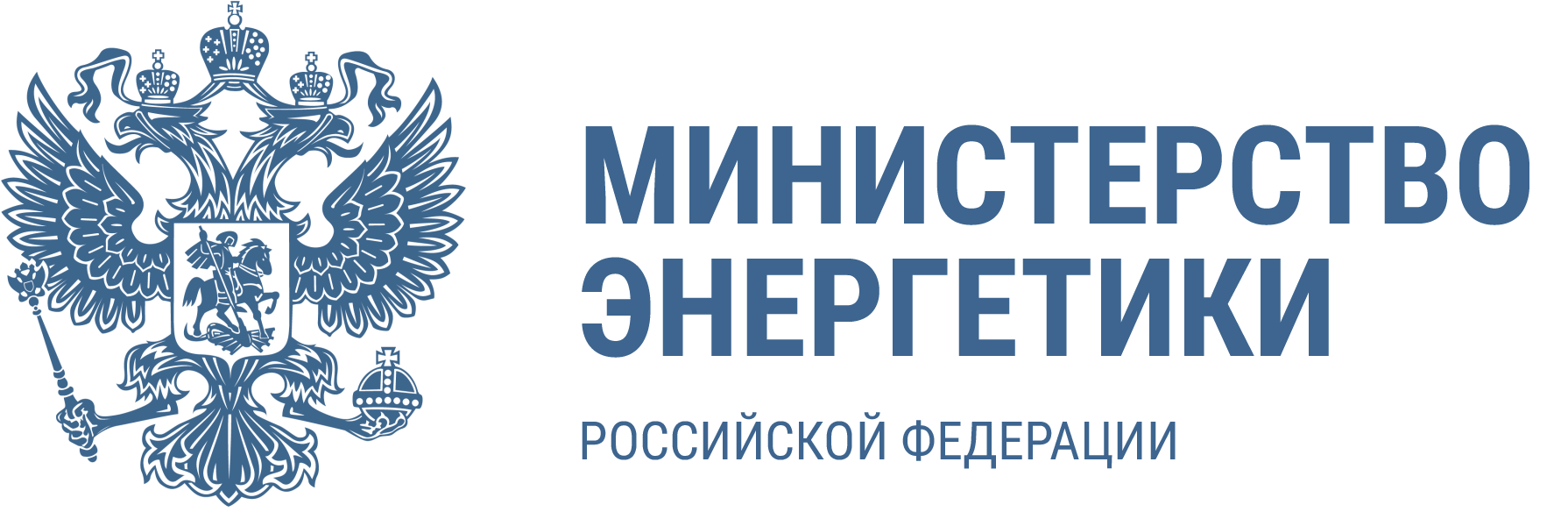

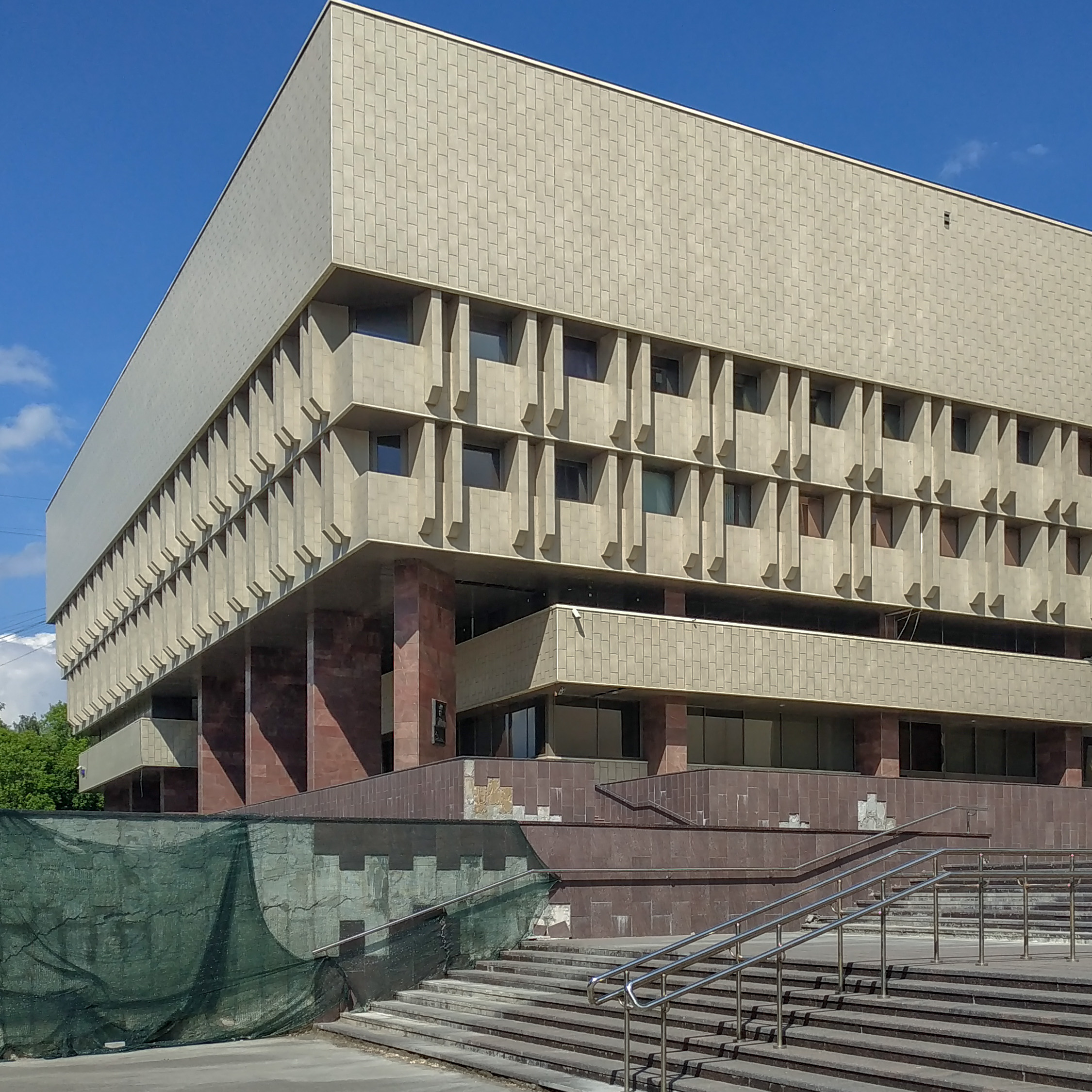
- Ministry's seat in Moscow

Agency overview
- Formed: 12 May 2008
- Preceding agency: Ministry of Industry and Energy of the Russian Federation
- Jurisdiction: Government of Russia
- Headquarters: Shchepkina st. 42, Moscow; 55°46′59.54″N 37°37′49.74″E
- Minister responsible: Sergey Tsivilyov
- Website: minenergogov.com

The Ministry of Energy of the Russian Federation is, since 2008, the Russian federal ministry responsible for energy policy.

This ministry was created in May 2008 as part of a reorganization by the incoming government of President Dmitry Medvedev. It is headquartered in Moscow. The former Ministry of Industry and Energy was turned into the Ministry of Industry, whose present Minister is Viktor Khristenko, gaining responsibility for trade policy from the former Ministry of Economic Development and Trade, but losing responsibility for energy policy, which was split off into the new Ministry of Energy. The former Federal Agency for Energy (Rosenergo) was also merged into the new Ministry of Energy.

As of May 2024, the Minister of Energy is Sergey Tsivilyov.

== History ==
The Ministry's predecessor in the government of the USSR was the Ministry of Energy and Electrification (Minenergo). The present Ministry still uses the Soviet-era "Minenergo" acronym.

In May 2024, the Ministry made production statistics a state secret as a result of the Ukrainian destruction by drone of refineries which tactic was a result of the 2022 Russian invasion of Ukraine, known to Russians as the Special Military Operation. Weekly fuel data from Rosstat were impaired by this decision.

=== May 2025 coal industry bailout ===
In December 2024 the Energy Minister announced that subsidies for coal miners would be developed "as soon as possible," because the European Union sanctioned Russia over its war in Ukraine, which Vladimir Putin had begun in February 2022. The Moscow Times reported on 12 December that the coal industry faced "multibillion-dollar losses and risk mass bankruptcies". Sergey Tsivilev said that Russia's chief coal-producing region, the Kuzbass (portmanteau for "Kuznetsk Basin"), which accounts for 60% of the country's hard coal and 80% of its coking coal output, was particularly victimized. Coal had accounted for nearly 40% of the Kuzbass region's tax revenues. The EU had sanctioned Russian coal on 10 August 2022. In 2021, Russia exported over 20% of its coal to the EU. More than 25 firms were in peril as of 2024. More than 60 firms lost above-average amounts of money in that year. "Some of them [were] delaying salary payments, laying off miners, and mothballing production. Particularly alarming was the situation around the "Inskaya" mine. In the past year, its miners not only staged strikes but also hunger strikes. By the end of 2024, more than half of the workforce had been laid off." In January 2025 one report said that "Russia's coal industry faces collapse due to sanctions". Coal companies posted a combined loss of $850 million over the first 10 months of 2024. Putin had to approve an emergency subsidy on 14 May 2025. "The crisis in the coal industry has become so severe that entire production facilities are being forced to shut down," a deputy minister told the State Duma. Deputy Prime Minister Alexander Novak waded into the morass on 25 April, calling for "high-level talks with China and India to abolish import duties on Russian coal." Novak proposed to absorb all the red ink by "restructuring or rehabilitating viable producers" through VEB.RF, another branch of the Russian state, and to subsidize the transport of the commodity through the state-owned Russian Railways. Putin approved the Novak bailout on 7 May.

=== Oil and gas investment needs double ===
As the oil and gas industry of Russia matures will result in increased investment per metered output. The Ministry of Energy stated in May 2025 that the country needs to double its investment in order to maintain production at the level of 540 million tons.

== See also ==
- Energy law
