= Sergey Tsivilyov =

Ukrainian-born Russian statesman

- Сергей Цивилёв
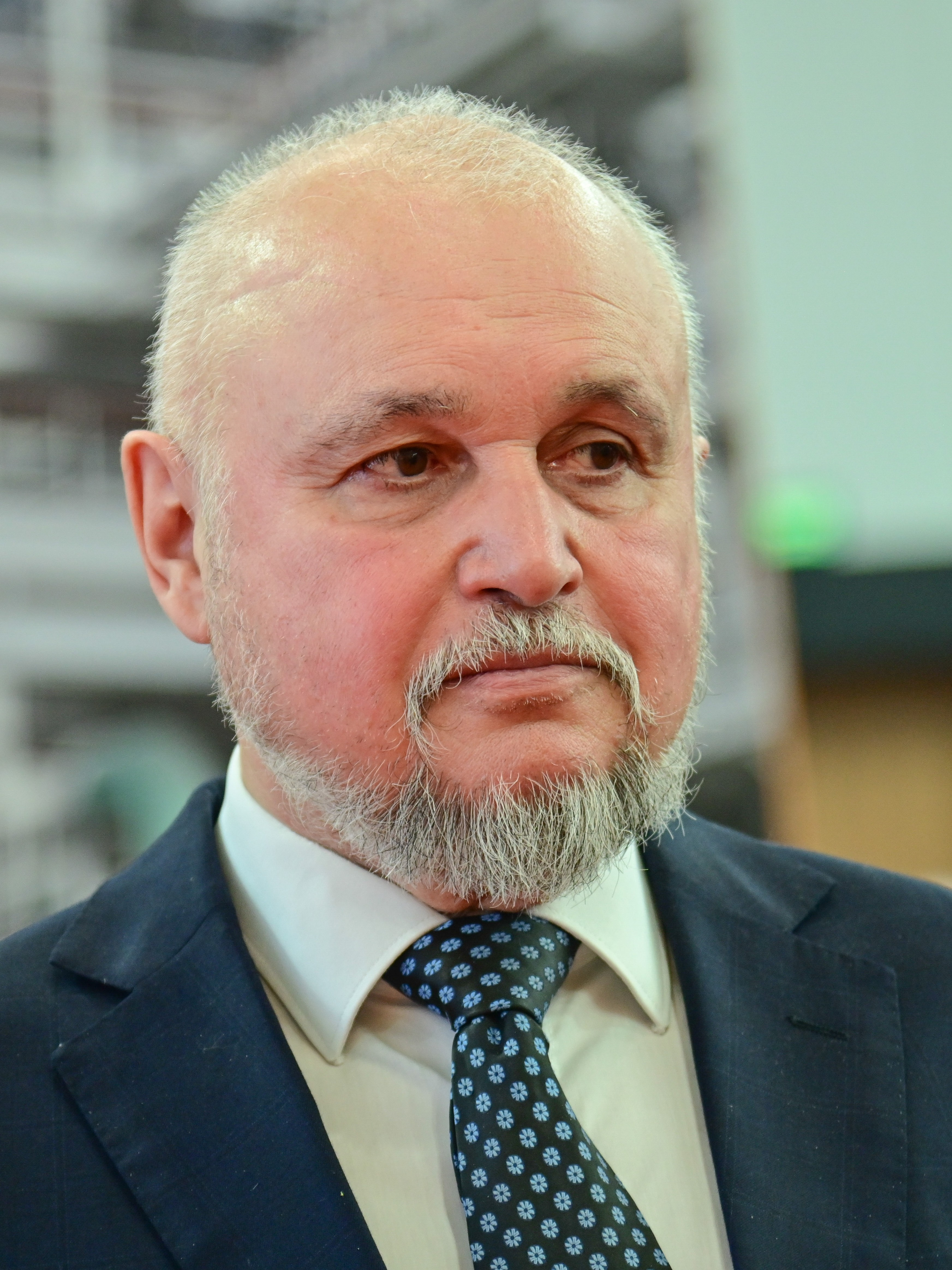
- Tsivilyov in 2025

Minister of Energy
- Incumbent
- Assumed office 14 May 2024
- Prime Minister: Mikhail Mishustin
- Preceded by: Nikolay Shulginov

Governor of Kemerovo Oblast
- In office 1 April 2018 – 14 May 2024
- Preceded by: Aman Tuleyev
- Succeeded by: Ilya Seredyuk

Personal details
- Born: Sergey Yevgyevich Tsivilyov; 21 September 1961 (age 65) Zhdanov, Ukrainian SSR, Soviet Union
- Party: United Russia
- Spouse: Anna Tsivilyova
- Education: St. Petersburg State University of Economics and Finance

Sergey Yevgenyevich Tsivilyov (Russian: Сергей Евгеньевич Цивилёв; born 21 September 1961) is a Russian statesman, politician, economist and former military officer who is currently serving as the Minister of Energy of Russia since 14 May 2024. He is a member of president Vladimir Putin's extended family by marriage to a daughter of his cousin, Deputy Minister of Defence Anna Tsivilyova.

Previously, he served as 3rd Governor of Kemerovo Oblast from September 2018 to May 2024. He is the member of the Bureau of the Supreme Council of the United Russia party.

== Biography ==
Sergey Tsivilyov was born on 21 September 1961 in Zhdanov (now Mariupol), Ukrainian SSR, Soviet Union. Immediately after the birth of Sergei, the Tsivilyov family began to live in the city of Kotlas, Arkhangelsk Oblast in Russia. 10 years later in 1971, they moved to the city of Chuguyev, in the Kharkov Oblast. His father, Yevgeny Semyonovich, was the deputy for production at a furniture factory. His mother, Dina Vasiliyevna, worked as a store manager in the same city.

=== Education ===
In 1983, Tsivilyov graduated from the PS Nakhimov Black Sea Higher Naval School in Sevastopol, specializing in ship armament, qualification - an officer with a higher military special education, an electrical engineer. After graduating from ChVVMU, he served in the Northern Fleet.

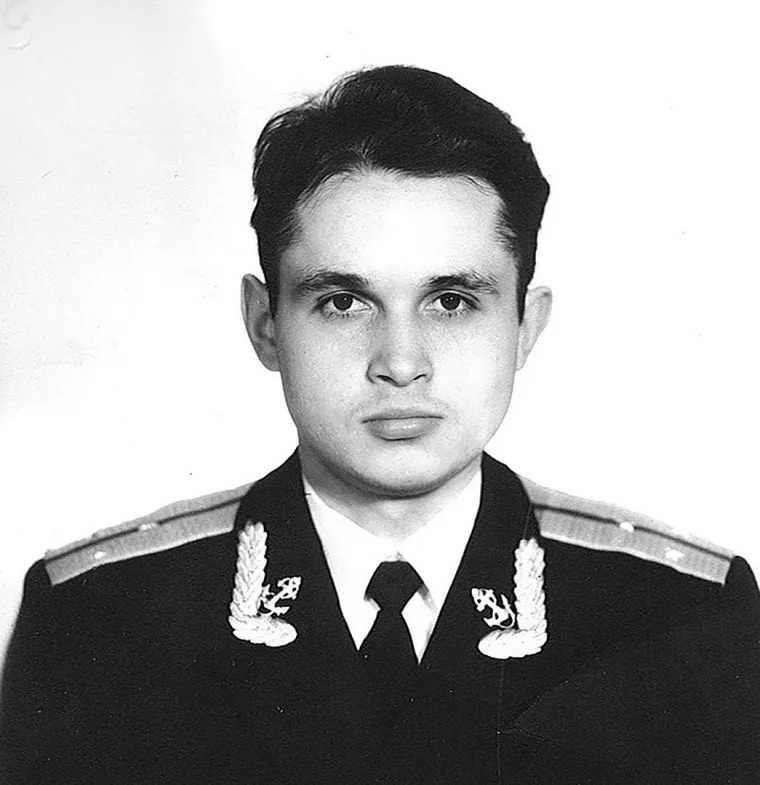
Tsivilyov as a cadet of the Black Sea Higher Naval School in 1983

In 1999, he graduated from the St. Petersburg State University of Economics and Finance with a degree in Finance and Credit, and qualified as an economist.

=== Career ===
Until 1994, Tsivilyov served in the Soviet Army, and the Russian Armed Forces and Navy in the Northern Fleet, and has the military rank of captain of the third rank.

From 1995 to 1996, he was the head of the security service at the St. Petersburg branch of Aeroflot Bank.

From 1997 to 2012, he headed the law firm Nortek in St. Petersburg.

In 2007, he co-founded the Lenexpoinvest company, which was supposed to build a new Lenexpo complex - where, in particular, the St. Petersburg International Economic Forum is held annually. Another co-founder of Lenexpoinvest was Viktor Khmarin, a classmate of Vladimir Putin, who studied martial arts with him, and the husband of Putin's cousin. Khmarin's companies in those years were one of the largest suppliers of equipment for Gazprom. Another co-founder of Lenexpoinvest is the former head of the Leningrad City Executive Committee Vladimir Khodyrev.

Since 2010, he has been investing in the mining sector.

From 2012 to 2013, he was deputy chairman of the board of directors of LLC Kolmar.

Since 2014, he was the CEO of the Kolmar company and the owner of 70% of its shares (the remaining 30% through the Volga Group belong to the entrepreneur Gennady Timchenko). Kolmar LLC is a complex of coal mining enterprises, trading and logistics organizations that form a single cycle of mining, enrichment and shipment of high-quality coal, which is mined at the deposits of the Neryungri region of the Republic of Sakha (Yakutia).

On 2 March 2018 Tsivilyov was the Deputy Governor of the Kemerovo Region for Industry, Transport and Consumer Market.

On 25 March 2018, a fire broke out in the Zimnyaya Vishnya shopping and entertainment center in Kemerovo, which killed 60 people. On 27 March 2018, the residents of Kemerovo went to a spontaneous rally during the protests, at which they demanded the resignation of the Governor of the Kemerovo Oblast, Aman Tuleyev and the administration of the city of Kemerovo, a transparent investigation and the prosecution of all those responsible. Tuleyev did not come to this rally, but the rally was attended by the deputy governor Tsivilyev, who, like Tuleyev, accused its participants of a PR attempt. In response, one of the rally participants, Igor Vostrikov, said that he "lost five people in the fire, three of them are children". Tsivilyov, later speaking at the same rally, asked the relatives of the victims for forgiveness, kneeling down in front of them.

=== Governor of Kemerovo Oblast ===
After the resignation of Tuleyev on 1 April 2018, Tsivilyov was appointed by President Putin as the interim governor of the oblast.

Tsivilyov was registered as a candidate for governor of the Kemerovo Oblast on 16 July 2018.

On 9 September 2018, Tsivilyov was elected Governor of the Kemerovo Oblast for 5 years. He took office on 17 September 2018.

On 8 December 2018, on the basis of the decision taken by the delegates of the XVIII Congress of the political party "United Russia", he was introduced to the Supreme Council of the party.

On 29 April 2019, at a hardware meeting, he threatened the nurses of the Anzhero-Sudzhensk city hospital, who went on a hunger strike against the mass layoff of medical staff. Declaring the inadmissibility of holding "rallies and strikes" in the field, he turned to the prosecutor's office and the police with a request to take tough measures against the hunger strikers.

At the end of 2019, the collegium of the Kemerovo region administration was transformed into the government of the Kemerovo Oblast.

In 2022, amid the Russian invasion of Ukraine, Tsivilyov initiated a campaign to refer to the region in official documents as "КуZбасс" (KuZbass), incorporating the Latin letter Z used as a pro-war symbol.

== Family ==
Tsivilyov is married to Anna Evgenievna Putina, a daughter of Vladimir Putin's cousin, who in March 2017 received a 70% stake in Kolmar Group LLC. Until 2 March 2018, the couple headed the Swiss company Kolmar Sales and Logistics.

His brother, Valery is the general director of Kolmar Group.

He has two sons, Anton and Nikita.

== Sanctions ==
On 21 July 2022, amid Russia's invasion of Ukraine, Tsivilyov was sanctioned by the European Union for spreading Russian disinformation. On 29 June 2022, he was also sanctioned by the United Kingdom, alongside his wife Anna Tsivilyova.
