= 2018 Kemerovo fire =

Shopping mall fire in Kemerovo, Russia

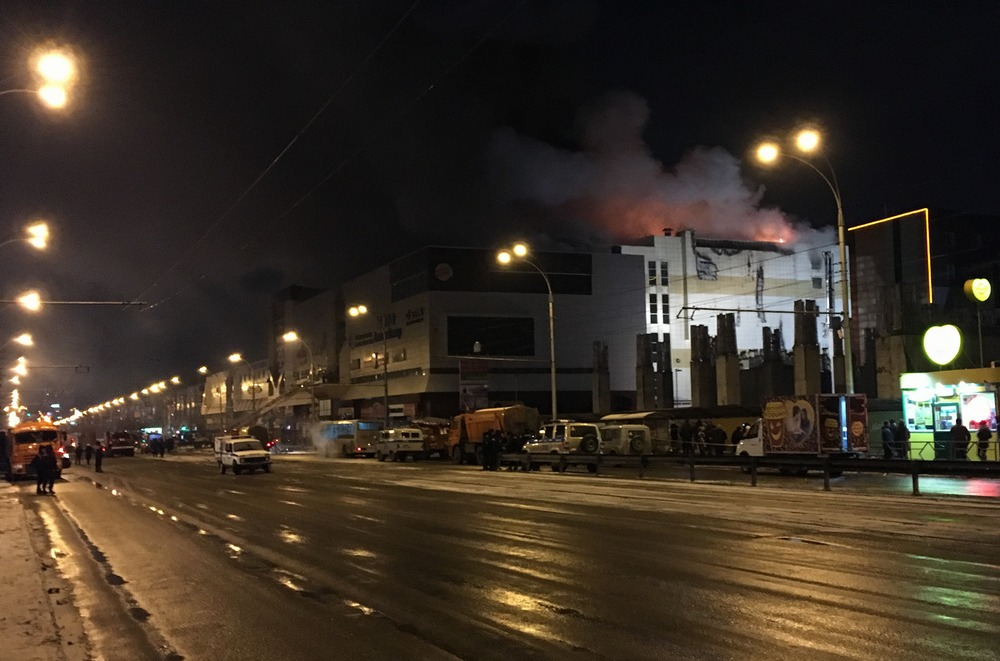
- The Winter Cherry complex during the fire
- Date: 25 March 2018
- Venue: Winter Cherry complex
- Location: Kemerovo, Russia; 55°20′37″N 86°04′40″E
- Type: Fire
- Deaths: 60
- Injuries: 79

On 25 March 2018 at 16:00 local time (9:00 UTC), a fire engulfed the Winter Cherry shopping mall and entertainment complex (Russian: Зимняя вишня, romanized: Zimnyaya vishnya) in Kemerovo, Russia. It killed at least 60 people (more than half of whom were children) according to official statements. The blaze started somewhere on the top floor of the four-story complex, and people were seen jumping from windows to escape it. One hundred people were evacuated, and another 20 were rescued. Others claim the number of people killed in the fire is being covered up, and that the real figure runs into the hundreds. According to the Russian authorities, the source of these rumors was a Ukrainian prankster who called the morgue posing as an emergency services officer. In 2018, he uploaded recordings of these calls to his YouTube channel and confirmed the calls during subsequent interviews.

== Background ==
The Winter Cherry shopping and entertainment complex (Russian: торгово-развлекательный комплекс «Зимняя вишня», romanized: torgovo-razvlekatelny kompleks "Zimnyaya vishnya") was a mall in Kemerovo, Russia.

The building was built in 1968 and was previously occupied by the Kemerovo Confectionery Factory, which ceased operations in 2006. The building initially had only two stories, but was renovated before the opening of the Winter Cherry mall. The renovations increased the amount of floors to four. The renovations were done without a building permit, and the Investigative Committee of Russia later opened a court case against Tanzila Komkova, the then-head of the State Construction Supervision Inspectorate of the Kemerovo Region, alleging that she failed to stop the unlicensed renovations of the building.

The mall opened in 2013 with 23,000 square meters of space, which included a petting zoo, children's center and bowling alley. The building was described as a labyrinth with few windows and points of entrance to the upper levels, with one main staircase, one lift shaft and one escalator. The fourth floor of the building housed the Winter Cherry Cinema, which included three cinema halls with a combined total of 542 seats (Hall 1 had 256 seats, while Halls 2 and 3 each had 143 seats). The fourth floor of the complex also housed a children's playground, an ice rink and a fitness club.

The building had suffered two previous fires: A fire occurred in 2003, while the building was still operating as a confectionary factory. This fire caused the roof to partially collapse. Another major fire occurred in 2013.

== Fire ==
Floor plan for the level 4 of Zimnyaya Vishnya shopping and entertainment center with the initial fire

Survivors reported that the fire started on the fourth floor play area, with the heat of the flames rising to 700 °C (1,300 °F), a heat so high that it set the bouncy castles ablaze. Many of the victims were in the mall's three cinemas, where two of the cinema roofs collapsed from the fourth floor into the third.

Several of the victims in the cinemas were children watching Sherlock Gnomes to start off the first day of a week-long school break. A survivor from the cinema claimed that those in the cinema heard no alarm, and had to break through one door and jump to safety. Once on the ground, survivors could only see dense black pungent smoke that had filled the children's playground and the other cinema hall. The fire alarm system at Kemerovo shopping mall had been switched off by a security guard.

Many children who were trapped in the fire called loved ones and friends to exchange last conversations and information. One deceased child's aunt recounted their conversation during the fire in which the victim stated; "everything burns and the doors are locked in the cinema."

A spokesperson for the Investigative Committee of Russia also stated that the fire exits in the building were blocked. Tajik shopkeepers saved around 50 people through an alternate exit. Staff and guards of the center were criticized by survivors for not arranging an organized evacuation effort, while some were praised for their efforts. A father of three deceased victims was critical of rescuers, claiming he led rescuers up the stairs, but they turned away after being ordered to go elsewhere and refused to give him a respiratory mask, citing regulations. In an interview he angrily stated "My daughters were left to burn because of their bloody rules."

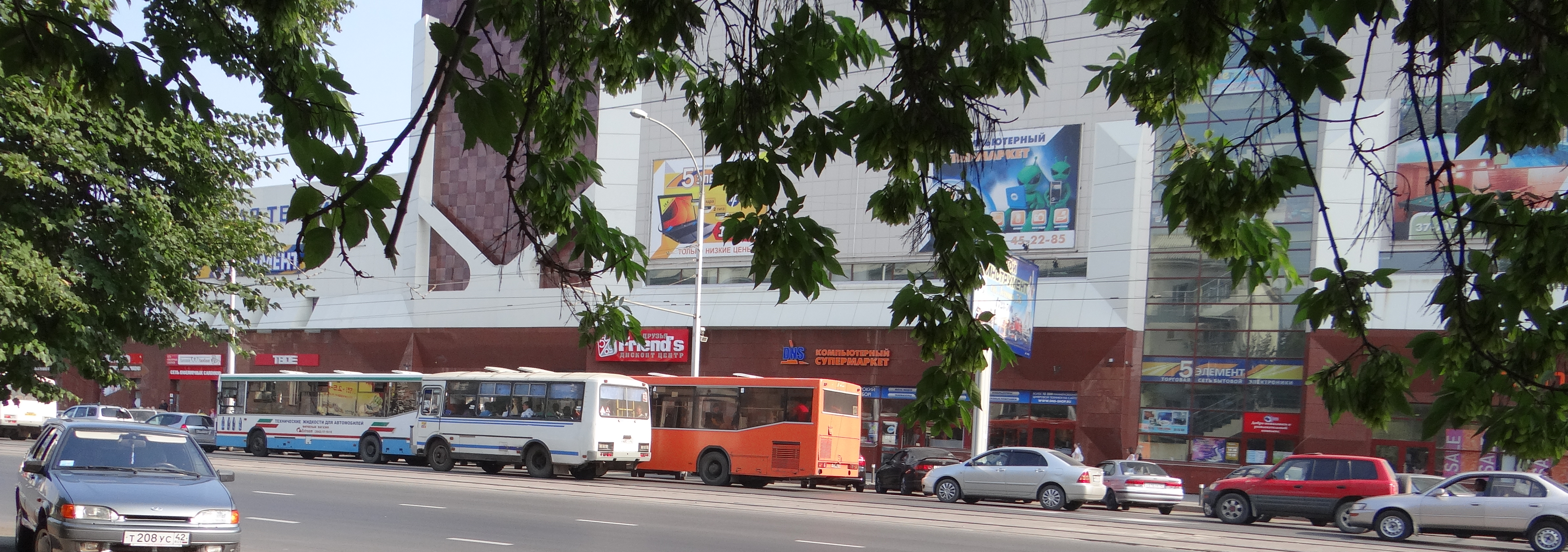
The shopping mall in 2012

Over 600 first responders spent over 17 hours fighting the flames well into the next day after the fire started. The fire spread to cover more than 1,500 square meters of the 23,000 square meter building, and kept firefighters from entering the building for 12 hours due to the heat and smoke.

== Victims ==
At least 64 people were killed in the fire, 41 of them children. Also among the fatalities were some 200 animals from the petting zoo. Thirteen people were hospitalized after the incident, with the Russian Health Minister Veronika Skvortsova claiming the most gravely injured was an 11-year-old boy who jumped from a fourth-floor window.

Due to the fire, identification of most bodies had to have DNA identification used to confirm their identities. As of March 27, 60 individuals were treated in hospitals, of whom 15 remained hospitalized and 40 received outpatient care; 25 victims, including 13 children were identified.

== Investigation ==
The Investigative Committee of Russia (SKR), opened an investigation into the cause of the fire, with the head of the SKR responding critically to the staff. In a statement he claimed "Most of the staff ran away and left parents and their children to their fate."

Four people have been detained in relation to the fire, including the head of the shopping complex's managing company. Investigators reported that the fire alarm system had not been working in the week leading up to the fire, rising into conflict with a previous report that a security guard had turned it off. The mall security guards were cited for failing to promptly turn the voice alert system on and that there is no reasonable explanation as to why that occurred.

Kemerovo Oblast deputy governor Vladimir Chernov said that the preliminary suspicion is that a child had a cigarette lighter which ignited foam rubber in a children's trampoline room and erupted in the fashion of gunpowder, but the actual cause of the fire was a spark from a lamp, that ignited the foam rubber in the trampoline room. There are many speculations that the wires in the lamp were loose, causing a spark. There is another theory that the plastic in the lamp melted, falling onto the foam rubber. Several arrests of these people have been made.

== Legal ==
The Investigative Committee of Russia brought charges under part 3 of Article 293 of the Russian Criminal Code; dereliction of duty which by negligence led to the deaths of two or more persons, against the head of a firefighting unit No.2. According to investigative reports, the lead firefighter did not listen to an eyewitness who reported that people were locked on the fourth floor, but instead sent the unit to a further location, which wasted time.

In 2021 eight people associated with the mall were sentenced to prison terms for fire safety violations or failure to aid people once the fire started.

In 2023 two government officials of the Kemerovo region were sentenced to prison for embezzlement, fraud, and negligence.

== Aftermath ==
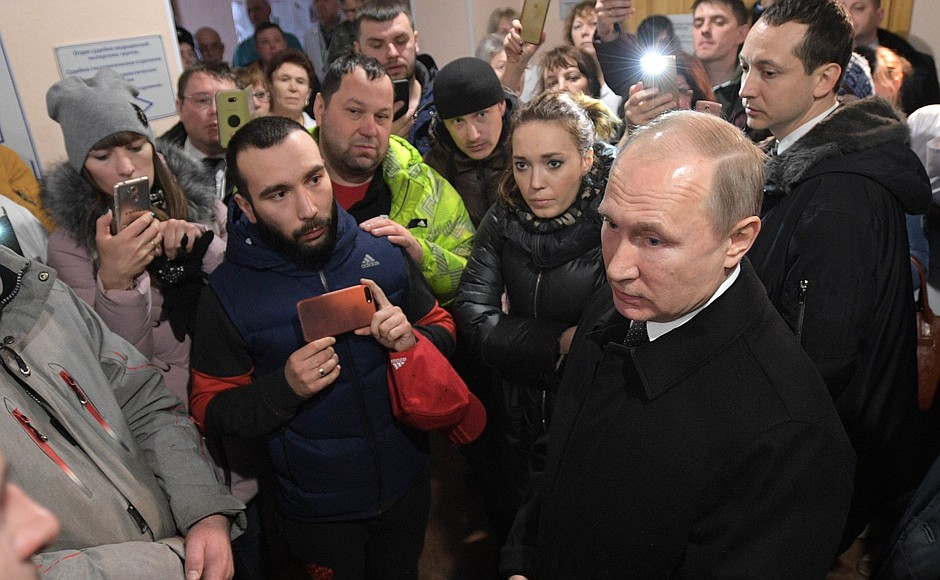
Vladimir Putin in Kemerovo meets with citizens, 27 March 2018

Politicians across the globe sent their condolences. 28 March 2018 was declared a national day of mourning in Russia.

A rally was held in Kemerovo demanding the resignation of Kemerovo Mayor Ilya Seredyuk and the longtime regional governor, Aman Tuleyev. On 1 April 2018, Aman Tuleyev resigned as the governor of Kemerovo Oblast, citing "a heavy burden" of the Kemerovo fire, and President Putin accepted Tuleyev's resignation.

A spokeswoman for the Foreign Ministry criticized the announcement of expulsions of Russian diplomats by the United States and a number of European countries in connection to the poisoning of a former Russian spy and his daughter, which happened a day after the tragedy, as showing disrespect to the deceased victims.

Local media named the owner of the mall as millionaire Denis Shtengelov. Shtengelov countered in an interview that his stake in the mall at the time of the fire was only a minority stake with other investors, however, he promised to pay compensation of 3-million rubles (about $52,500) to each victim's family. This would be in addition to the regional government's reported compensation to the families of victims, which is equivalent to $17,500 each.

As of July 2018, the building is being demolished. In March 2019, construction of a park designed by architect John Calvin Weidman was started at the place of the demolished mall. Named the Park of Angels, it was opened on 15 September 2019.

=== Memorials and tributes ===
Across Russia, central squares were turned into memorials for those killed with flowers and candles. A local memorial was erected in a plaza outside of the shopping center, and there was an influx of individuals donating blood for those injured.

International memorials to the victims were erected in other locations, such as New York City.

== See also ==
- Lame Horse fire (2009)
- 2015 Kazan Shopping Center fire
- 2022 Kemerovo nursing home fire
