= Legislative Assembly of Kemerovo Oblast =

Regional parliament of Kemerovo Oblast, Russia

Legislative Assembly of Kemerovo Oblast — Kuzbass Законодательное собрание Кемеровской области — Кузбасса
- 6th legislature

Type
- Type: Unicameral

Leadership
- Chairman: Aleksey Zelenin, United Russia since 14 September 2018

Structure
- Seats: 46
- Political groups: United Russia (40) CPRF (2); LDPR (2); SRZP (1) New People (1)

Elections
- Voting system: Mixed
- Last election: 8-10 September 2023
- Next election: 2028

Meeting place
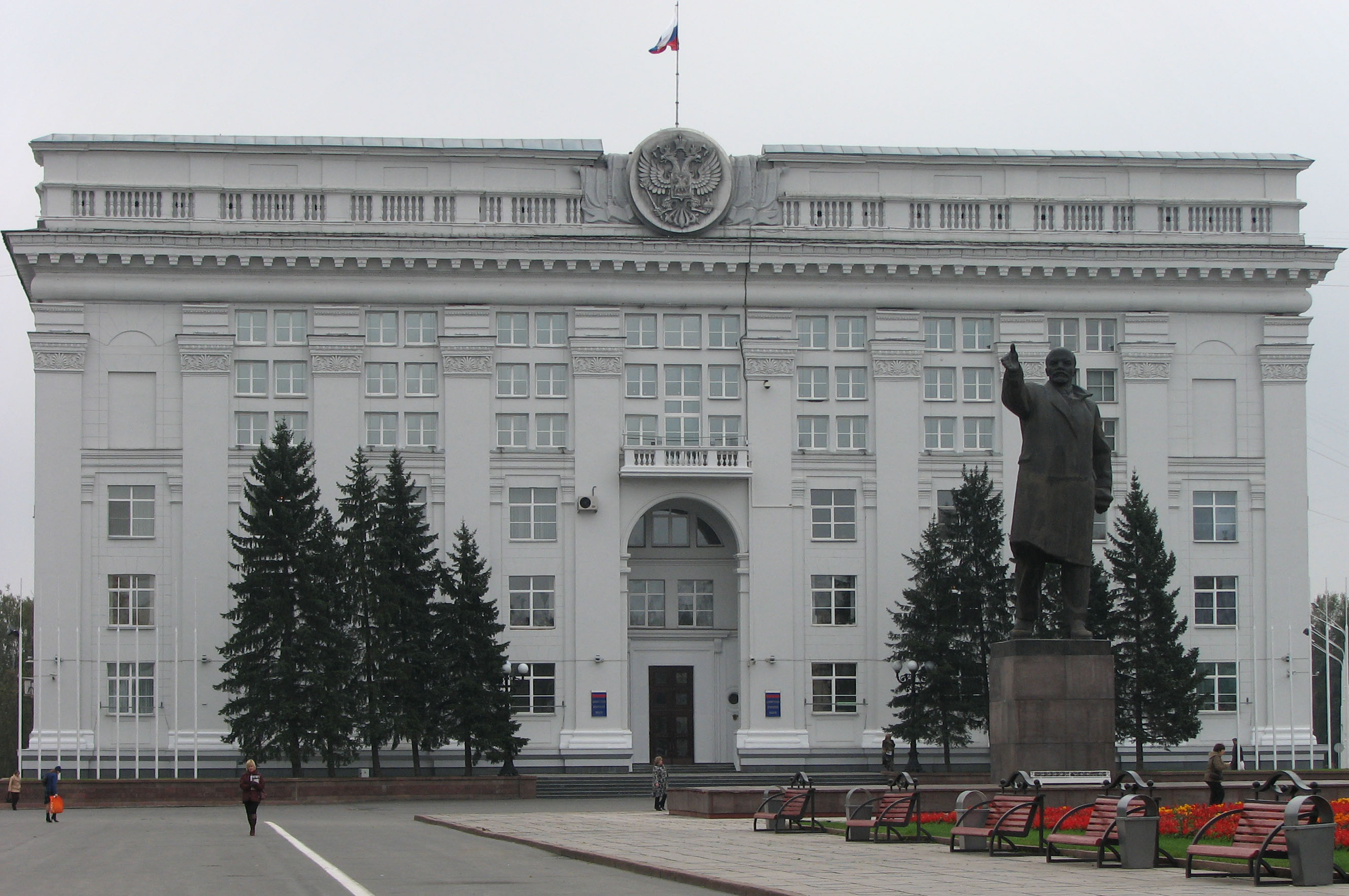
- Sovetskiy Prospekt, 58, Kemerovo

Website
- zskuzbass.ru

The Legislative Assembly of Kemerovo Oblast — Kuzbass (Parliament of Kuzbass), (Note: Russian: Законодательное собрание Кемеровской области — Кузбасса (Парламент Кузбасса), romanized: Zakonodatelnoye sobraniye Kemerovskoy oblasti — Kuzbassa (Parlament Kuzbassa)) formerly the Council of People's Deputies of Kemerovo Oblast (Note: Russian: Совет народных депутатов Кемеровской области, romanized: Sovet narodnykh deputatov Kemerovskoy oblasti) until 2019, is the regional parliament of Kemerovo Oblast, a federal subject of Russia. A total of 46 deputies are elected for five-year terms.

== Elections ==
=== 2018 ===
Party	%	Seats
United Russia	64.40	39
Liberal Democratic Party of Russia	10.10	2
Communist Party of the Russian Federation	10.03	2
A Just Russia	7.84	2
Patriots of Russia	5.84	1
Registered voters/turnout	66.39	

=== 2023 ===
Party	%	Seats
United Russia	69.42	40
Liberal Democratic Party of Russia	9.30	2
Communist Party of the Russian Federation	8.87	2
A Just Russia - For Truth	5.41	1
New People	5.36	1
Registered voters/turnout	80.70	
