= Electoral history of Boris Yeltsin =

Elections featuring President of Russia

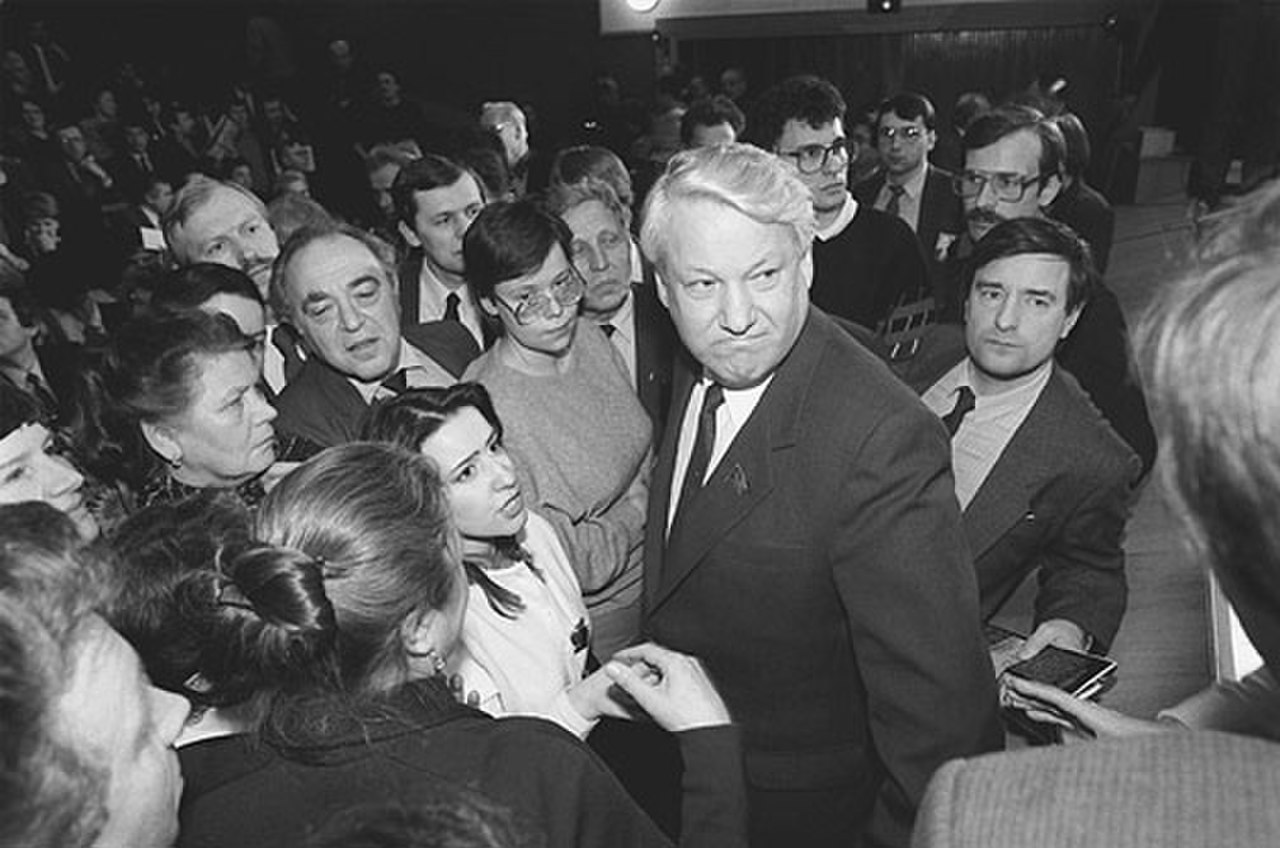
Boris Yeltsin during his USSR People's Deputy electoral campaign 1989.

Electoral history of Boris Yeltsin, 1st President of Russia.

== People's Deputy of the Soviet Union ==
=== 1989 ===
1st Moscow constituency:

- Boris Yeltsin — 91.53%

== Chairman of the Supreme Soviet of Russia ==
=== 1990 ===
- Boris Yeltsin — 535 votes (53.9%)
- Aleksandr Vlasov — 467 votes (47.1%)

== President of Russia ==
=== 1991 ===
1991 election. Blue indicates a win by Yeltsin, red a win by Ryzhkov, grey indicates a win by Tuleyev.

1991 presidential election
Nominee	Running mate	Party	Votes	%
Boris Yeltsin	Alexander Rutskoy	Independent	45,552,041	58.6
Nikolai Ryzhkov	Boris Gromov	Communist Party	13,395,335	17.2
Vladimir Zhirinovsky	Andrey Zavidiya	Liberal Democratic Party	6,211,007	8.0
Aman Tuleyev	Viktor Bocharov	Independent	5,417,464	7.0
Albert Makashov	Aleksei Sergeyev	Independent	2,969,511	3.8
Vadim Bakatin	Ramazan Abdulatipov	Independent	2,719,757	3.5
Against all			1,525,410	2.0
Source: Nohlen & Stöver, University of Essex, Voice of Russia

=== 1996 ===
First round of 1996 election. Grey indicates a win by Yeltsin, red a win by Zyuganov.

First round of 1996 presidential election
Candidate	Party	Votes	%
Boris Yeltsin	Independent	26,665,495	35.8
Gennady Zyuganov	Communist Party	24,211,686	32.5
Alexander Lebed	Congress of Russian Communities	10,974,736	14.7
Grigory Yavlinsky	Yabloko	5,550,752	7.4
Vladimir Zhirinovsky	Liberal Democratic Party	4,311,479	5.8
Svyatoslav Fyodorov	Party of Workers' Self-Government	699,158	0.9
Mikhail Gorbachev	Independent	386,069	0.5
Martin Shakkum	Independent	277,068	0.4
Yury Vlasov	Independent	151,282	0.2
Vladimir Bryntsalov	Russian Socialist Party	123,065	0.2
Aman Tuleyev	Independent	308	0.0
Against all		1,163,921	1.6
Source: Nohlen & Stöver, Colton

Second round of 1996 election. Grey indicates a win by Yeltsin, red a win by Zyuganov.

Second round of 1996 presidential election
Candidate	Party	Votes	%
Boris Yeltsin	Independent	40,203,948	54.4
Gennady Zyuganov	Communist Party	30,102,288	40.7
Against all		1,163,921	1.6
Source: Nohlen & Stöver, Colton
