= Electoral history of Aman Tuleyev =

List of elections featuring Aman Tuleyev as a candidate

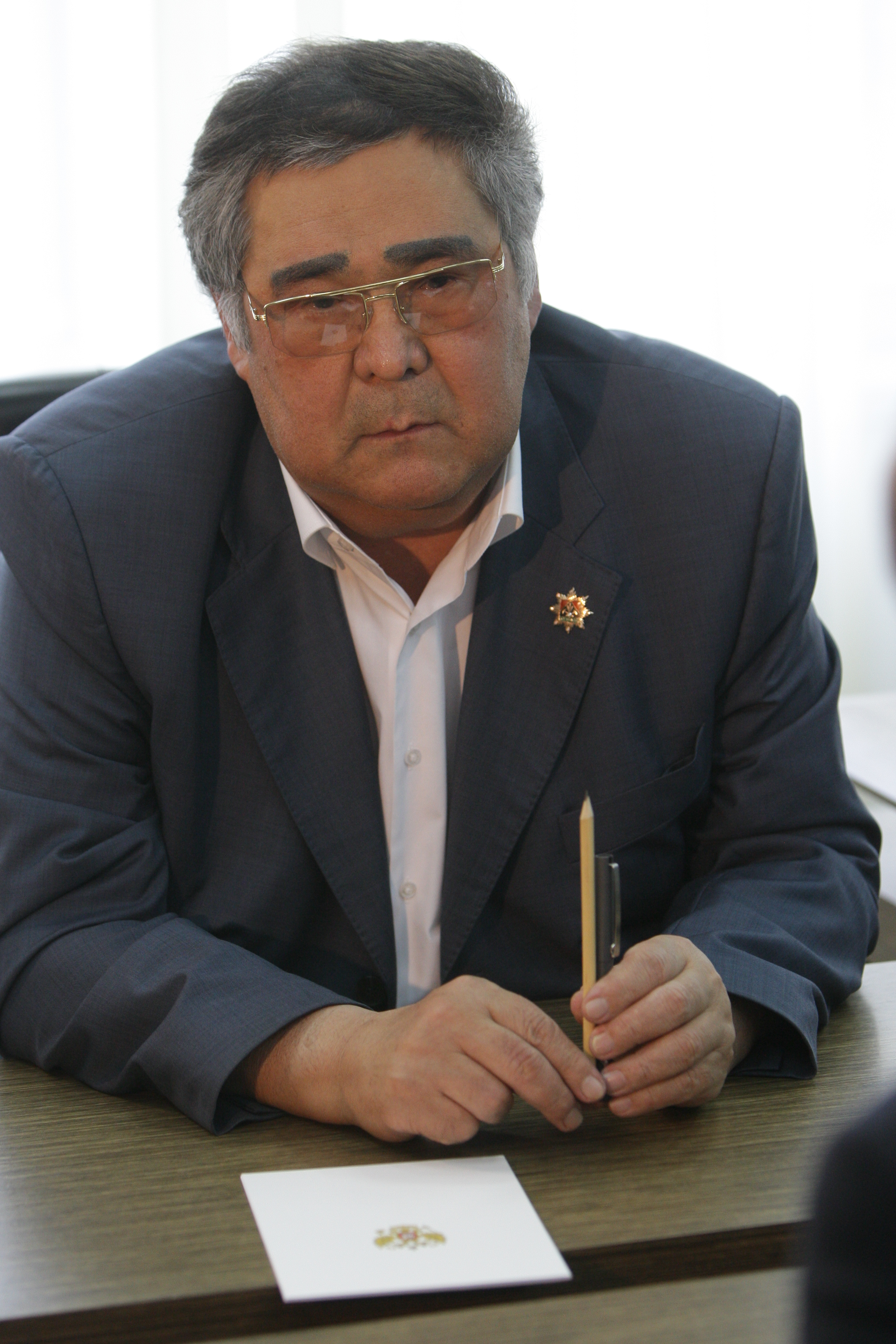
Aman Tuleyev

Electoral history of Aman Tuleyev, second Governor of Kemerovo Oblast.

== People's Deputy of the Soviet Union ==
- Yury Golik — 56.6%
- Aman Tuleyev — 35.6%

== Russian presidential election, 1991 ==
1991 election. Blue indicates a win by Yeltsin, red a win by Ryzhkov, grey indicates a win by Tuleyev.

1991 presidential election
Nominee	Running mate	Party	Votes	%
Boris Yeltsin	Alexander Rutskoy	Independent	45,552,041	58.6
Nikolai Ryzhkov	Boris Gromov	Communist Party	13,395,335	17.2
Vladimir Zhirinovsky	Andrey Zavidiya	Liberal Democratic Party	6,211,007	8.0
Aman Tuleyev	Viktor Bocharov	Independent	5,417,464	7.0
Albert Makashov	Aleksei Sergeyev	Independent	2,969,511	3.8
Vadim Bakatin	Ramazan Abdulatipov	Independent	2,719,757	3.5
Against all			1,525,410	2.0
Source: Nohlen & Stöver, University of Essex, Voice of Russia

== Russian presidential election, 1996 ==
Aman Tuleyev was registered as a presidential candidate, however, a few days before the election, withdrew in favor of Gennady Zyuganov, but received 308 votes during the early voting (up to the withdrawal of the candidature), which were credited as valid.

First round of 1996 presidential election
Candidate	Party	Votes	%
Boris Yeltsin	Independent	26,665,495	35.8
Gennady Zyuganov	Communist Party	24,211,686	32.5
Alexander Lebed	Congress of Russian Communities	10,974,736	14.7
Grigory Yavlinsky	Yabloko	5,550,752	7.4
Vladimir Zhirinovsky	Liberal Democratic Party	4,311,479	5.8
Svyatoslav Fyodorov	Party of Workers' Self-Government	699,158	0.9
Mikhail Gorbachev	Independent	386,069	0.5
Martin Shakkum	Independent	277,068	0.4
Yury Vlasov	Independent	151,282	0.2
Vladimir Bryntsalov	Russian Socialist Party	123,065	0.2
Aman Tuleyev	Independent	308	0.0
Against all		1,163,921	1.6
Source: Nohlen & Stöver, Colton

== Kemerovo Oblast gubernatorial election, 1997 ==
Nominee	Party	Result
Aman Tuleyev	Independent	94.54%
Viktor Medikov	Regions of Russia	2.08%
Nina Ostanina	Communist Party	0.38%
Source: Губернаторские выборы - 1997

== Russian presidential election, 2000 ==
2000 election. Blue indicates a win by Putin, red a win by Zyuganov, grey a win by Tuleyev.

2000 presidential election
Candidate	Party	Votes	%
Vladimir Putin	Independent	39,740,467	53.4
Gennady Zyuganov	Communist Party	21,928,468	29.5
Grigory Yavlinsky	Yabloko	4,351,450	5.9
Aman Tuleyev	Independent	2,217,364	3.0
Vladimir Zhirinovsky	Liberal Democratic Party	2,026,509	2.7
Konstantin Titov	Independent	1,107,269	1.5
Ella Pamfilova	For Civic Dignity	758,967	1.0
Stanislav Govorukhin	Independent	328,723	0.4
Yury Skuratov	Independent	319,189	0.4
Alexey Podberezkin	Spiritual Heritage	98,177	0.1
Umar Dzhabrailov	Independent	78,498	0.1
Against all		1,414,673	1.9
Source: Nohlen & Stöver, University of Essex

== Kemerovo Oblast gubernatorial election, 2001 ==
Nominee	Result
Aman Tuleyev	93.54%
Sergey Neverov	0.71%
Nikolay Vlasov	0.66%
Pyotr Safonov	0.35%
Against all	3.23%
Source: Губернаторские выборы - 2001

== Kemerovo Oblast gubernatorial election, 2015 ==
Nominee	Party	Result	
Aman Tuleyev	Independent	1,818,087	96.69%
Alexei Didenko	Liberal Democratic Party	33,411	1.78%
Viktor Shalamanov	Communist Party	9,840	0.52%
Vladimir Volchek	A Just Russia	6,889	0.37%
Yury Skvortsov	Patriots of Russia	5,790	0.31%
Source: Результаты выборов

== Chairman of the Council of People's Deputies of Kemerovo Oblast ==
=== 2018 ===
For		Against		Abstaining		No voting	
38	82.6%	1	2.2%	0	0.0%	7	15.2%
