= Russian Party (Russia) =

Russian Party Русская партия
- Abbreviation: RP (English); РП (Russian)
- Leader: Vladimir Miloserdov (disputed) or Viktor Korchagin (disputed)
- Founder: Viktor Korchagin
- Founded: 17 May 1991
- Dissolved: 1996-1997
- Headquarters: Moscow, Russia
- Newspaper: Russkiye Vedomosti, Rusich
- Paramilitary wing: Russian Guard
- Membership (1992): 5,237
- Ideology: Russian ultranationalism Russian irredentism Antisemitism; Economic liberalism Anti-Christianity; Anti-communism (factions)
- Political position: Far-right
- Religion: Slavic Neopaganism
- National affiliation: People's Patriotic Union of Russia

The Russian Party (RP; Russian: Русская партия; РП; Russkaya partiya, RP) was a Russian nationalist party founded on May 17, 1991, by Viktor Korchagin. The original name was Russian Party of the RSFSR. By the spring of 1992 it had over 5 thousand members. In 1992, after an internal party conflict, Vladimir Miloserdov became party leader, although the split lasted until 1996, when Korchagin dissolved his faction. Under the party in 1993, a paramilitary unit "Russian Guard" was created, which participated in the Defense of the House of Soviets. In 1996, the Russian Party supported Zyuganov's candidacy during the presidential elections in the Russian Federation. The most active regional organizations of the Russian Party were Saint Petersburg (headed by N.N.Bondarik) and Oryol branches (headed by Igor Semenov).

The party published antisemitic newspapers (Russkiye Vedomosti, Rusich), and also criticized Christianity and showed sympathy for Slavic neopaganism.

== Ideology ==
The party advocated the annexation of adjacent territories inhabited by the Russian-speaking population to Russia (Northern Kazakhstan, Donbas, Latgale, Crimea), if they have a common border with Russia. It also supported the independence of Transnistria. At the same time, Korchagin considered the independence of the Chechen Republic of Ichkeria "the lesser evil" on condition of mutual exchange of the population. The party supported the implementation of market economic reforms while preserving the state sector of the economy and proposed the introduction of a state of emergency in order to achieve statutory goals.
