= Ralph Clem =

United States Air Force general

Ralph Scott Clem is a Florida International University professor emeritus, USAF General (Retired) and Russian specialist. In addition to being a major professor and prior chair of the Department of International Relations at Florida International University, he also headed the Center for Transnational and Comparative Studies. While he is generally known for his Russian-focused research, his areas of expertise include economics and population studies and Ukraine. Dr. Clem maintains fluency in Russian and has been recognized for his distinguished service in education.

== Books ==
General Clem has authored scholarly articles and several books which focus on Russian economic and military topics. In the field of Russian studies he is an acknowledged expert and still continues to do consulting work.

His works include:

- Soviet West: Interplay Between Nationality and Social Organization. Praeger Special Studies in International Politics and Government. ISBN 0-275-09840-0
- Research Guide to Russian and Soviet Censuses (Studies in Soviet History and Society). ISBN 0-8014-1838-0
- Urban-rural voting differences in Russian Elections, 1995–1996: A rayon level analysis. ASIN: B0006QUV48
- The Russian Parliamentary Elections of 1995: The Battle for the Duma. ISBN 0-7656-0084-6
- Spatial Patterns of Political Choice in the Post-Yeltsin Era: The Electoral Geography of Russia's 2000 Presidential Election.
- The End of Eurasia: Russia on the Border Between Geopolitics and Globalization.

== Educational awards and recognition ==
- Fellow of the Kennan Institute of the Woodrow Wilson International Center for Scholars
- Fellow of the Harriman Institute at Columbia University
- Ryder Corporation Excellence in Teaching Award
- Professional Excellence Award (State University System of Florida)

== Grants ==
- National Council for Russian and East European Research
- U.S. Department of State
- John D. and Catherine T. MacArthur Foundation
- U.S. Department of Education

== See also ==
- Electoral geography of Russia
