= Russian presidential elections =

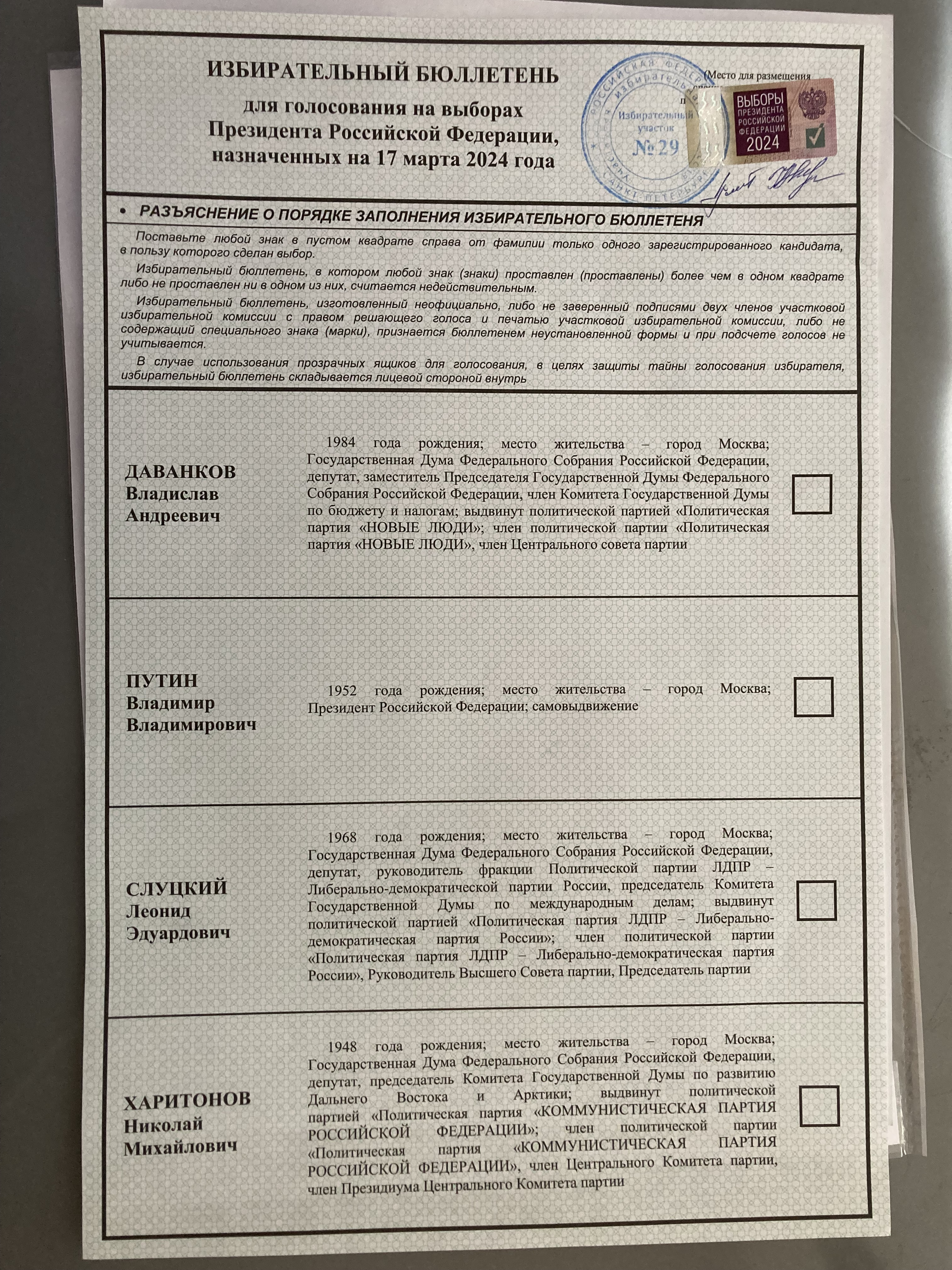
Ballot of the 2024 election with the list of the presidential candidates

Russian presidential elections determine who will serve as the president of Russia for the next six (formerly four from 1996 to 2012 and five from 1991 to 1996) years.

Since the establishment of the position of the President of Russia in 1991, the presidential elections have taken place eight times: in 1991, 1996, 2000, 2004, 2008, 2012, 2018, and 2024. The next presidential election is scheduled for March 2030.

== Electoral legislation ==
Russian presidential elections are governed by the Russian Constitution, the Federal law on basic guarantees of electoral rights and the right to participate in referendums of citizens of the Russian Federation and the federal law on Presidential elections of the Russian Federation. The provisions of the electoral legislation were constantly evolving, but the foundations of the electoral system remained unchanged.

Laws on elections of the President of Russia were adopted four times. From 1991 to 2003, before each election a new law was adopted: in 1991, in 1995, in 1999, and in 2003. Currently, there is a federal law "on Presidential elections of the Russian Federation" #19-FZ from January 10, 2003, in the version from December 5, 2017.

== Candidates ==
=== Eligibility ===
The Russian Constitution sets out the following requirements for presidential candidates:

- Be at least 35 years old;
- Be a resident in Russia for at least 20 years;
- Do not have a foreign citizenship or permanent residency in a foreign country, either at the time of the election or at any time before.

In addition, the Federal Law "On the elections of the President of the Russian Federation" sets additional requirements, according to which, candidates may not be persons:

- Recognized incapable by court or kept in places of deprivation of liberty by the sentence of the court;
- Sentenced to deprivation of liberty for committing grave and (or) particularly grave crimes and having on the day of voting not removed and outstanding previous conviction for the specified crime;
- Condemned to imprisonment for Commission of the serious crime which criminal record is removed or extinguished - before the expiration of 10 years from the date of removal or repayment of criminal record;
- Sentenced to imprisonment for committing a particularly serious crime, the conviction of which is withdrawn or repaid - before the expiration of 15 years from the date of removal or repayment of the criminal record;
- Convicted for committing extremist crimes under the Criminal Code of Russia and having on the day of voting not removed and outstanding previous conviction for the specified crime;
- Subjected to administrative punishment for Commission of the administrative offenses provided by articles 20.3 (propaganda or public demonstration of Nazi attributes or symbols, or attributes or symbols of extremist organizations, or other attributes or symbols, propaganda or public demonstration of which is prohibited by Federal law) and 20.29 (production and distribution of extremist materials) of the Code of the Russian Federation on Administrative Offenses if vote on the presidential elections takes place before the termination of term during which the person is considered to be subjected to administrative punishment;
- Concerning which the sentence of court on deprivation of its right to hold the state positions within a certain term came into force;
- Holding the position of President of the Russian Federation for the second consecutive term on the date of official publication of the decision on appointment of election of the President of the Russian Federation.

=== Gender ===
Of all the candidates for President of Russia, only three were female. These were Ella Pamfilova in 2000, Irina Hakamada in 2004 and Ksenia Sobchak in 2018. In addition, there were other women who ran for president, but for one reason or another were not registered.

No.	Year	Picture	Name	Party	Votes
1	2004		Irina Khakamada	Independent	2,672,189 (3.9%)
2	2018		Ksenia Sobchak	Civic Initiative	1,226,145 (1.7%)
3	2000		Ella Pamfilova	For Civic Dignity	758,966 (1.0%)

=== Perennial candidates ===
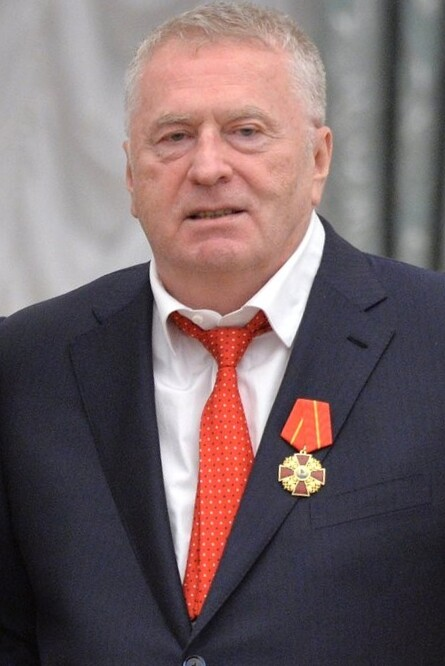
Vladimir Zhirinovsky participated in the elections six times.

Out of all the candidates, eight have participated in the elections more than once (of these, only two won the election each time, Boris Yeltsin and Vladimir Putin). The record for participation in the elections is held by Vladimir Zhirinovsky, who participated in the elections six times, from the first election in 1991 to 2018 (except the 2004 election). Vladimir Putin has participated in five elections. Gennady Zyuganov was a candidate four times. Aman Tuleyev and Grigory Yavlinsky were candidates three times, while in 1996 Tuleyev withdrew his candidacy a few days before the election, and Yavlinsky also tried to run in 2012, but was rejected. Boris Yeltsin, Nikolay Kharitonov and Sergey Mironov were candidates twice.

Electoral results of perennial candidates
Candidate	1991	1996 (1)	1996 (2)	2000	2004	2008	2012	2018	2024
Yeltsin	57.3%	35.3%	53.8%						
Tuleyev	6.8%	<0.1%		3.0%					
Zhirinovsky	7.8%	5.7%		2.7%		9.4%	6.2%	5.7%	
Zyuganov		32.0%	40.3%	29.2%		17.7%	17.2%		
Yavlinsky		7.3%		5.8%				1.0%	
Putin				53.0%	71.3%		63.6%	76.7%	87.28%
Mironov					0.8%		3.9%		
Kharitonov					13%				4.31%

== Procedure ==
=== Nomination of candidates ===
Candidates can be nominated by a political party or run as independents. To officially nominate candidates, a party congress (for party candidates) or an initiative group meeting (for independent candidates) must be held. In any case, regardless of the method of nomination, a candidate must submit to the CEC consent to be nominated by a specific political party or a specific initiative group.

==== Political party ====
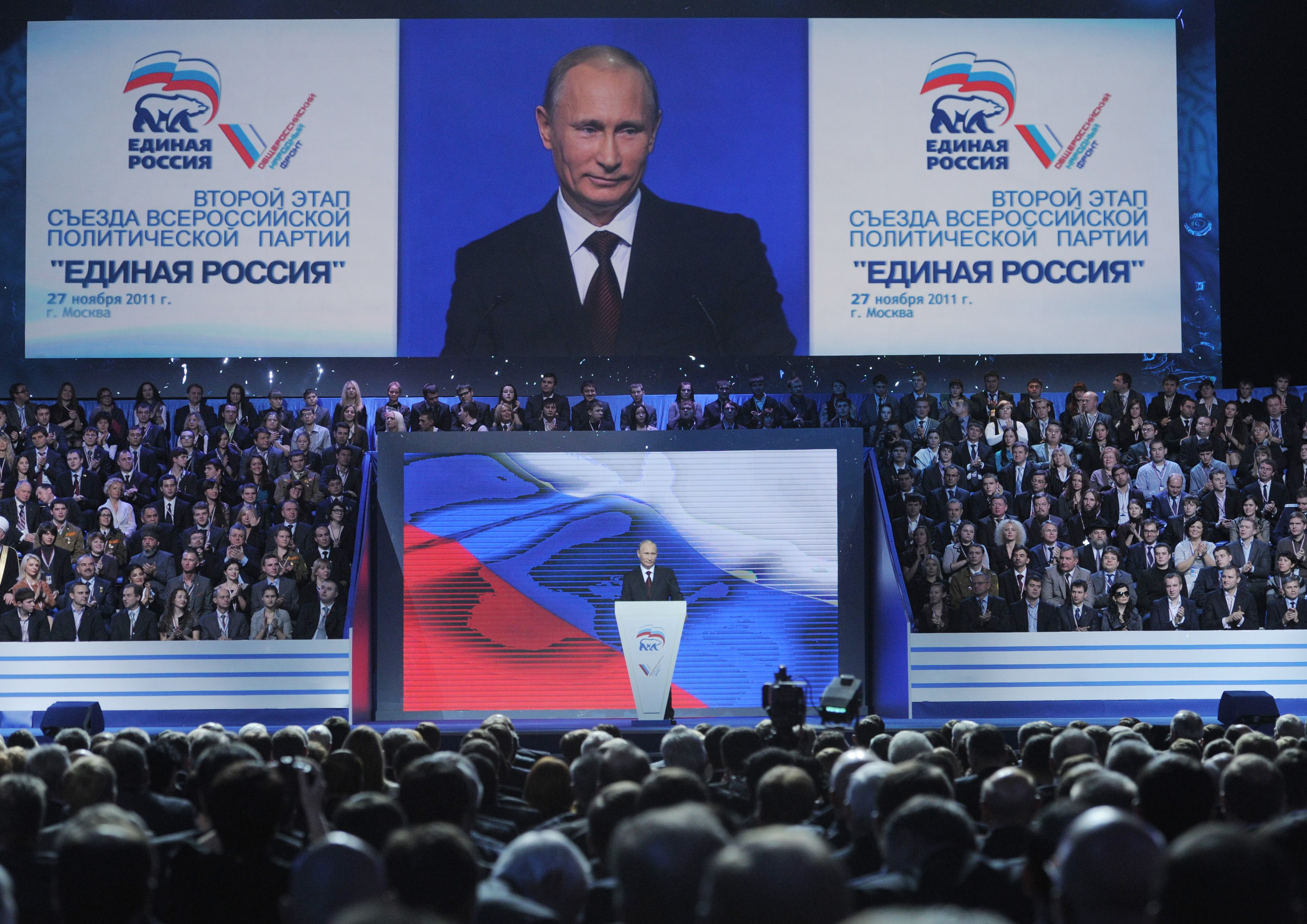
2012 United Russia's nominee Vladimir Putin in the party congress

To be nominated by a political party, a party congress must be held. At least one delegate from at least half of the federal subjects (i.e. at least 46 delegates) is required to nominate a candidate.

A political party can only nominate one candidate. Also, the same candidate can only be nominated by one political party. At the same time, political parties may not nominate candidates at the congress, but may decide to support a candidate nominated by another party or an independent candidate. However, in this case, such party de jure will not participate in the election campaign, it will not be indicated in ballots, information stands and other official documents.

Candidates nominated by political parties with factions in the State Duma (the lower house of the Russian parliament) or in legislatures at least one-third of the federal subjects are exempt from collecting signatures and are automatically included in the ballots.

All candidates from other political parties must gather 100,000 signatures.

==== Independent candidates ====
To nominate an independent candidate, a meeting of the initiative group of voters must be held. The initiative group must consist of at least 500 Russian citizens who have the right to vote. At the same time, unlike political party congresses, initiative groups do not require representation of federal subjects (all members of the group can be residents of the same federal subject).

To participate in the election, an independent candidate must gather 300,000 signatures.

=== Popular vote ===
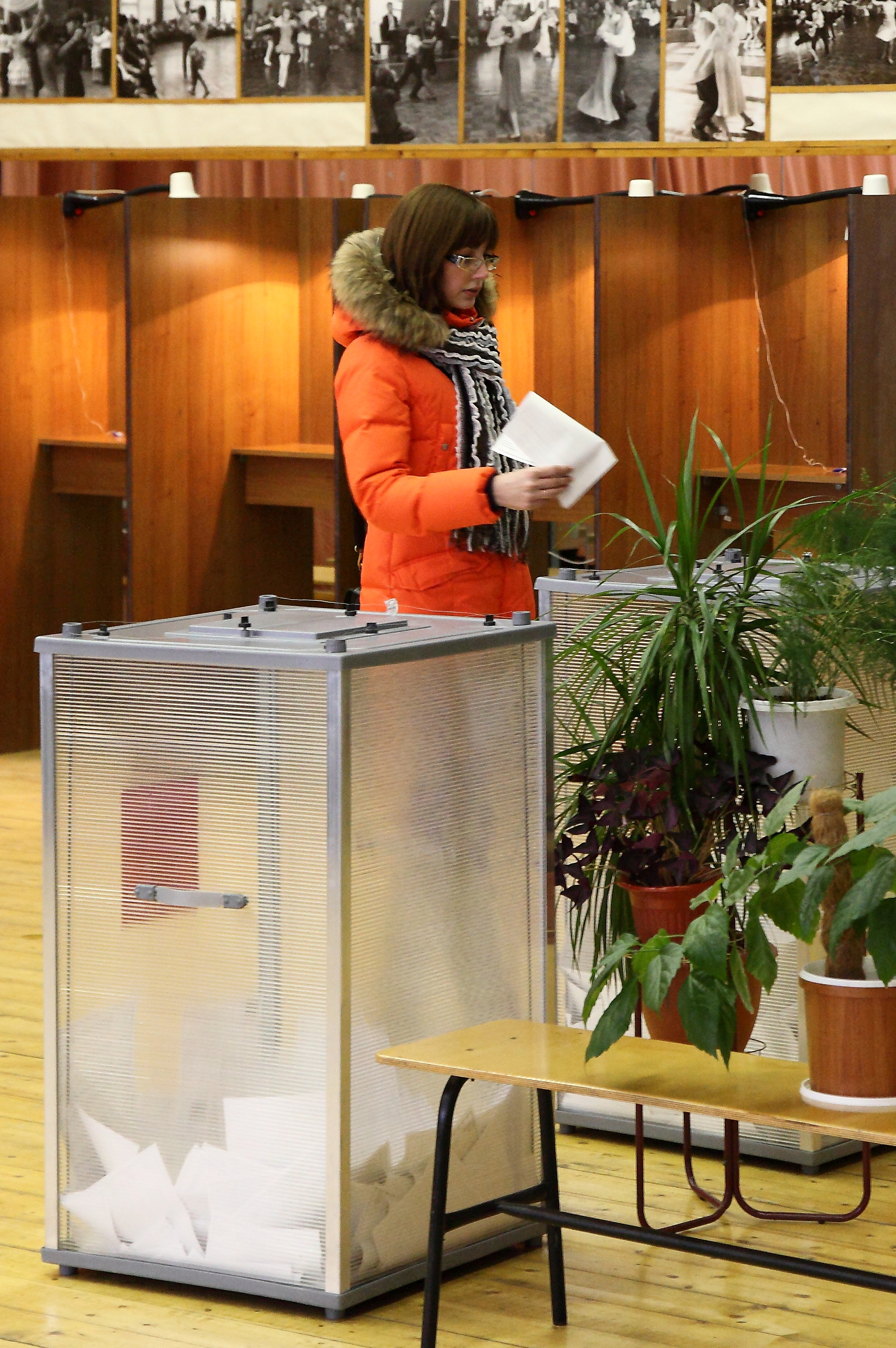
The vote in the 2012 election.

The elections are held on the second Sunday of the month when the previous elections were held. If this day coincides with a day preceding a holiday day, or this Sunday falls on the week including a public holiday or Sunday is duly announced a work day, elections are called for the next Sunday.

The president is elected by direct popular vote in a two-round majoritarian contest: if no candidate receives over 50% of the vote in the first round, the two candidates with the most votes advance to a run-off. The second (run-off) round is held exactly three weeks after the first. The second round shall appoint with the written consent of the candidate to participate in the second round. If, prior to the second round, one of the registered candidates to be voted on has withdrawn his candidacy or has left it for other reasons, his / her place shall, by the decision of the Central Election Commission, be transferred to the next registered candidate by the number of votes obtained. A new candidate shall be put to the vote if there is a written Declaration of consent to participate in the second round of elections. Such application must be submitted to them no later than the second day after the departure of the candidate who initially participated in the second round. In this case, the voting shall be held on the first Sunday after 14 days from the date of application. At the end of the second round, the candidate with a simple majority of votes is considered elected. The second round can be held and one candidate, if after the departure of the remaining candidates will be only one. In this case, the voters must vote "for" or "against" the candidate. At the same time, the candidate is considered elected if he has received at least 50 percent of the votes. Otherwise, the election campaign starts again and new election are held.

=== Election calendar ===
The typical periods of the presidential election process are as follows, with the dates corresponding to the 2018 election:

- Since September 2016 (legislative election) – Public announcement of the intention to participate in the election.
- December 2017 – Federation Council appoints the election. This should occur in 90–100 days before election day. If the Federation Council does not appoint an election, the election shall be appointed by the Central Election Commission.
- December 2017 to January 2018 – Nominating conventions (including the conventions of the initiative groups for the nomination of independent candidates). Candidates file their Statement of Candidacy with the Central Election Commission.
- January to February 2018 – Collection of signatures for candidates from non-parliamentary parties and independent candidates.
- December 2017 to February 2018 – Registration of candidates.
- February and March, 2018 – Agitation in mass media (including debates).
- March 17, 2018 – Day of silence (ban on any agitation).
- March 18, 2018 – Election Day.
- April 7, 2018 – Day of silence (during the second round).
- April 8, 2018 – Second round (if necessary).
- May 7, 2018 – Inauguration Day.

== Video surveillance of the elections ==
In December 2011, Russian Prime Minister Vladimir Putin proposed the Central Election Commission and the Ministry of Telecom and Mass Communications to ensure the surveillance procedures of voting and counting of votes in the presidential elections. According to the technical task set by the CEC, 91,400 election stations were covered by the video monitoring system. Two cameras were installed on each section. One passed the General plan, the second — directly to a ballot box. A total of 182,800 cameras were installed. Public access to election observation was carried out on a special web site. To view the videos of voting and counting votes, users must select the election stations from which they want to receive broadcasts on the day of voting.

Video surveillance systems were used in the 2018 election, with cameras installed at 80% of election stations. In addition, cameras were installed for the first time in the territorial election commissions, which carry out the counting of votes at the level of cities and districts.

== List of Russian presidential elections ==
- 1991 Russian presidential election
- 1996 Russian presidential election
- 2000 Russian presidential election
- 2004 Russian presidential election
- 2008 Russian presidential election
- 2012 Russian presidential election
- 2018 Russian presidential election
- 2024 Russian presidential election

== See also ==
- Elections in Russia
