= People's Patriotic Union of Russia =

Political association in Russia

People's Patriotic Union of Russia Народно-патриотический союз России
- Abbreviation: NPSR
- Leader: Gennady Zyuganov (1996-2004); Gennady Semigin (2004-2010)
- Founders: Gennady Zyuganov; Alexander Rutskoy; Aman Tuleyev; Aleksandr Nazarchuk; Nikolay Maksyuta; Nikolai Kondratenko; Vasily Starodubtsev
- Founded: 7 August 1996
- Dissolved: 17 May 2010
- Merged into: Patriots of Russia
- Succeeded by: National Patriotic Forces of Russia
- Headquarters: 11th Building, Smolensky Boulevard, Moscow, Russia. 119121
- Newspaper: Iskra (Spark)
- Membership: >350 (delegates)
- Ideology: Patriotism; Nationalism; Statism; Soviet patriotism
- Political position: Big tent
- Member parties: Communist Party; Agrarian Party; Spiritual Heritage; Derzhava; Union of People's Power and Labor; Russian Party; Party of Social Justice
- Slogan: "Great Russia, Great People, Great Future" (Russian: "Великая Россия, великий народ, великое будущее")

Website
- npsr.ru

The People's Patriotic Union of Russia (NPSR; Russian: Народно-патриотический союз России, romanized: Narodno-patrioticheskiy soyuz Rossii) was a political association in Russia, created on August 7, 1996 by political parties and public organizations that supported Gennady Zyuganov in the presidential elections.

In 2003, there was a conflict between the NPSR and the CPRF, and after 2004 the NPSR practically lost its political significance.

== Creation of the NPSR ==
The People's Patriotic Union was created on the basis of the Bloc of People's Patriotic Forces (BNPS). The creation was initiated by several dozen opposition parties and organizations. The founding congress adopted a resolution on the formation of the movement, approved the charter, adopted a statement and an appeal to the citizens of Russia. Gennady Zyuganov was elected chairman, Alexander Rutskoy and Aman-Geldy Tuleev were elected co-chairs. Vasily Starodubtsev was elected a member of the presidium, Nikolai Kondratenko, Yuri Lodkin, Nikolay Maksyuta, Aleksandr Nazarchuk, Alexander Suvorov were elected members of the coordinating council. Nikolai Ryzhkov was elected chairman of the executive committee of the NPSR.

From August 1996 to July 1, 2004, Zyuganov was the chairman of the Coordinating Council of the NPSR. On September 12, 2004, Gennady Semigin was elected the Chairman of the Coordination Council.

In 1998–2000, Viktor Zorkaltsev was the chairman of the executive committee of the NPSR. On June 8, 2000 Aman Tuleyev was expelled. In 2000, the executive committee of the NPSR was headed by businessman Gennady Semigin, in 2004 he was replaced by Vladimir Baev.

The NPSR included the Communist Party of the Russian Federation, the Agrarian Party of Russia, and others. In 1996, there were about 150 political organizations. The highest governing body of the NPSR is the congress. In the intervals between congresses, the work is led by a coordination council (about 150 people - one representative each from the subjects of the Russian Federation, as well as representatives from parties and associations).

The NPSR, together with the Communist Party of the Russian Federation, participated in the gubernatorial elections, gaining power in 40 constituent entities of the Federation (the so-called "red belt", or people's patriotic belt). In particular, by January 1997, the NPSR candidates had won in 16 out of 33 constituent entities where elections for heads of regions were held. It was assumed that at the elections to the State Duma in 2003, instead of the list of the CPRF, a list of the NPSR would be put up.

The NPSR was funded by Semigin, the heads of the regional branches of the NPSR (many of whom were also heads of local branches of the CPRF) received salaries. So, in 2004, the newspaper "Kommersant" wrote with reference to the report on the activities of the executive committee of the NPSR from the website of the movement: "In 2002, 83 regional branches of the union had 905 released employees, and another 483 positions were allocated to the heads of city and regional organizations of the NPSR".

Congresses of the NPSR:

- I (constituent) Congress - August 7, 1996
- II Congress - November 21, 1998
- III Congress - September 23, 2000
- IV Congress - September 12, 2004

== Conflict between the NPSR and the CPRF (2000-2004) ==
On the eve of the Elections to the State Duma of the third convocation, a conflict broke out in the NPSR, caused by the position of the largest member of the union - the Communist Party of the Russian Federation. On September 15, 1999, the Control and Auditing Commission of the NPSR accused the CPRF leadership of not including a number of NPSR leaders (Nikolai Ryzhkov and others) when drawing up the list of candidates for deputies. The recent decision of the Presidium of the Coordinating Council of the NPSR to dismiss the co-chairs of the NPSR Constitutional Court Mikhail Lapshin (leader of the Agrarian Party of Russia) and Alexey Podberezkin ("Spiritual Heritage") from their posts was recognized as inconsistent with the NPSR charter. The KRC decided to convene an emergency meeting of the Coordinating Council of the NPSR, at which to initiate the convocation of an extraordinary congress of the NPSR, and in case of opposition from the executive committee or the Coordination Council, to convene the Congress by the forces of the KRC itself. At this congress, it was planned to expel Gennady Zyuganov from the NPSR for the collapse of the patriotic coalition.

The CPRF really distanced itself from Mikhail Lapshin and Alexey Podberezkin, who collaborated with the Fatherland-All Russia bloc in the 1999 elections. Also on October 1, 1999, the chairman of the executive committee of the NPSR Viktor Zorkaltsev, in response to the accusations of the KRC, the NPSR said that 11 out of 18 seats in the central list were given to non-party supporters in the CPRF electoral list, the list included 50 members of the Agrarian Party "OVR"), 7 representatives of the DPA, 4 members of the "Spiritual Heritage", representatives of other parties and public associations, as well as the CPRF will support more than 50 independent candidates - "single-mandate".

In the summer of 2000, in an interview with Rossiyskaya Gazeta, Aman Tuleyev noted that the difficulties in the NPSR and the Russian patriotic movement are related, among other things, to the reluctance of the “party generals” (first secretaries of the regional Communist Party committees) to give up their seats on the election lists to their allies.

On the eve of the III Congress of the NPSR, the KRC accused the Coordinating Council of the NPSR of violating the rules of the charter during the preparation of the congress: violation of the norms of representation (which ensured the hegemony of the communists to the detriment of the allies), the absence of reports on the agenda of the chairmen of the Coordination Council, the executive committee and the Control and Auditing Commission. V. I. Miloserdov, chairman of the NPSR KRC, noted in his draft report that the communists hindered the participation of the NPSR in the elections to the State Duma of the III convocation, did not take measures to re-register the NPSR into an all-Russian political movement, actually disbanded the executive committee of the NPSR and fired the staff, in violation of the Charter The NPSR expelled the Agrarian Party, Spiritual Heritage, Blok of Aman Tuleyev - Narodovlastie, from the association and co-opted a number of persons into the Coordination Council. The assignment of the powers of the Congress of the NPSR in terms of electing the Chairman of the executive committee at a meeting of the Coordinating Council was also noted.

By the decision of the III Congress of the NPSR, the Control and Auditing Commission (KRC) was abolished.

On January 5, 2003, in a joint article "Operation Mole" by the editor-in-chief of the newspaper "Zavtra" Alexander Prokhanov and the editor-in-chief of the newspaper "Sovetskaya Rossiya" Valentin Chikin, Semigin was accused of "destructive" influence on the CPRF and the NPSR. The article, citing closed sources, said that the presidential administration and the headquarters of Yeltsin's "Family" were preparing a "coup in the ranks of the opposition" by introducing their "agents of influence" into the NPSR and intercepting leadership. In the conclusion of the article, it was proposed to neutralize the actions of Semigin and his people. In response, Semigin called Chikin and Prokhanov "political provocateurs and schismatics." Semigin also said that he would finance only the structures of the NPSR, but not the CPRF. The communists assessed this as an attempt to bribe the first secretaries of the regional CPRF committees.

On January 14, 2003, Zyuganov wrote in his article: "It is necessary, without delay, to regulate the activities of all structures of the NPSR, to overcome the bureaucracy of the Executive Committee leadership." Commenting on the letter from Semigin, in which he announced the suspension of funding, Zyuganov said: "I would like to remind all sorts of 'merchants' who are trying to slap the party with their wallet on the shoulder and strive to privatize the CPRF and the NPSR: they will never succeed!".

On January 18, 2003, the Presidium of the CK CPRF put forward a number of claims against Semigin. On January 30, 2003, Gennady Zyuganov criticized Semigin.

Semigin's supporters accused the communists of unwillingness to go to the elections as a united coalition, opponents - of inconsistency of the name of the CPRF-NPSR bloc with the election legislation (the name could have no more than seven letters), in addition, the bloc could have no more than three organizations, and The NPSR consisted of four.

Despite the flared up conflict, in September 2003 Semigin was included in the federal electoral list of the CPRF in the parliamentary elections (number 18), a number of functionaries of the NPSR were also included in the list of the CPRF, but in impassable places. In December 2003, at the Congress of the CPRF, Semigin was nominated as a candidate from the Communist Party in the Presidential elections in Russia on March 14, 2004. On December 28, 2003, the Congress of the Communist Party of the Russian Federation approved Nikolay Kharitonov as a candidate by a small majority of delegates' votes, who received 123 votes. Semigin got 105 votes, three delegates voted against all. Later, the chairman of the Central Control and Auditing Commission of the CPRF, Vladimir Nikitin, described the attempt to nominate Semigin as a course towards an alliance with the patriotic bourgeoisie as opposed to an alliance with the peasantry.

On January 14, 2004, Gennady Zyuganov and Vladimir Nikitin's "Appeal to all party organizations of the Communist Party" was published, in which Semigin was already clearly accused of bribing the secretaries of regional organizations of the CPRF and was called a "presumptuous businessman." All organizations of the CPRF were ordered to "resist attempts to destroy the party, turning it into a servant of capital and the current regime."

On May 18, 2004, the Presidium of the Central Committee of the CPRF expelled Semigin from the party by a majority vote. On May 19, 2004, Semigin announced his withdrawal from the Communist Party faction in the State Duma.

On July 1, 2004, at a meeting of the coordination council, Zyuganov was removed from his post as chairman and expelled from the NPSR. Together with him, Valentin Kuptsov, Ivan Melnikov and Nikolay Kharitonov were expelled.

In Prokhanov's novel "Politolog", which describes these and other events, a character named Semizhenov appears (a millionaire trying to take control of the patriotic movement). Its prototype is Semigin.

== NPSR after 2004 ==
Later, the NPSR became part of the center-left coalition "Patriots of Russia" of Semigin, and practically lost its political significance.

== Goals and ideology of the NPSR ==
Ideology - patriotism, statehood, social justice.

- In the social sphere: guarantees of free medical care, as well as secondary and higher education. Elimination of unfair property and social stratification in society;
- Election of government bodies as the most important principle of state functioning;
- Preservation of the state integrity and territorial unity of the country;
- Ensuring the peaceful, non-violent development of the political process;
- In the economy: the return under state control of strategically important sectors; reducing the tax burden on domestic producers; transition to state pricing for a number of important goods and services; revising the results of privatization and canceling all transactions in violation of the law; ensuring real equality of all forms of ownership; suppression of illegal export of capital abroad; combating dollarization of the economy; restructuring of external debt.
