= Gennady Zyuganov 1996 presidential campaign =

Russian presidential campaign

- Campaign: 1996 Russian presidential election
- Candidate: Gennady Zyuganov; First Secretary of the Central Committee of the Communist Party of the Russian Federation (1993–present); Leader of the Communist Party of the Russian Federation in the State Duma (1993–present); Member of the State Duma (1993–present)
- Affiliation: Communist Party of the Russian Federation

The 1996 Gennady Zyuganov presidential campaign sought to elect the leader of the Communist Party of Russia, Gennady Zyuganov as President of Russia in the 1996 presidential election.

While originally heavily viewed as the favorite to win the election, Zyuganov saw his early lead slip over the course of the election and was ultimately handed a decisive defeat by incumbent Boris Yeltsin in the runoff election.

== Background and early developments ==
Zyuganov entered the election season with major factors in his favor, and was initially considered to be the frontrunner.

The success of his party in the 1995 legislative elections earned Zyguyanov an invaluable resource, namely momentum. Zyuganov argued that the results of the 1995 election showed that "anticommunist" sentiments were not prominent amongst the electorate. As a result of his showing, and the poor showing of pro-reformist parties, in the 1995 legislative elections, at the start of the year 1996, most observers (both domestic and foreign) believed that Zyuganov would win in a free and fair presidential election. So convinced was the Communist Party in Zyuganov's prospects, that before his campaign even began they had already begun discussing who would be appointed in his presidential administration.

Early on, Zyuganov benefited from a portion of the Russian electorate perceiving him to be a more favorable alternative to other opposition candidates, such as Alexander Lebed and Vladimir Zhirinovsky.

One of the advantages that Zyuganov enjoyed was that his candidacy was backed by a genuine political party structure. Following their disappointing showing in the 1993 legislative election, the Communist Party had spent put an immense effort into rebuilding their party's national grassroots organization. The strength of that effort had been demonstrated with the party's success in the 1995 legislative election.

In rebuilding the party, the party had reactivated its youth wing (Komsomol), strengthened relations with trade unions and women's groups sympathetic to the communist cause, and had begun to court business figures who they hoped could be convinced would benefit from a "stable future" under a CPRF leadership.

The party had also figured out means of circumventing the obstacles presented by their limited campaign funds. Instead of being used for official parliamentary business, the party's parliamentary resources (including phones, faxes, office space and personnel) were utilized for campaign-related purposes. Additionally, Zyguyanov and other members of the party used the travel privileges they were granted in their capacity as deputies in the Duma in order to make trips to Russia's various regions (often by train). They utilized government trips as unofficial campaign visits.

In January 1996, Zyuganov took steps to better situate himself for the presidential election. To improve the image of the communists, his party elected Gennadiy Seleznyov as Chairman of the State Duma on January 17. Seleznyov was considered a charismatic politician. Zyuganov himself traveled on a tour of western nations in an attempt to reassure the international community that a Communist victory would not threaten foreign investment in Russia.

=== Securing the Communist Party nomination ===
Following the legislative election, an internal poll revealed that nearly 20% of the Communist Party's members would prefer a "more charismatic" candidate for president. It was suggested that Anatoly Lukyanov, Aman Tuleyev or Pyotr Romanov might challenge Zyuganov for the party's nomination.

In order to assure that his potential challengers within the party would have no time to organize campaign efforts, Zyuganov convened a party assembly one month after the legislative election where the nominee was voted upon.

=== Preventing "spoiler" candidates ===
After securing his party's nomination, Zyuganov made an effort to prevent spoiler candidates from arising. He worked to receive the endorsements of other political parties and movements. He first looked to solidify his support from the left. He moved to secure his position as the leading candidate of the left-wing by seeking assurance from a number of potential left-wing candidates that they would not run for president and would instead lend their support to his candidacy. As a result of the Communist Party's performance in the legislative election, Zyuganov was easily able to unite the majority of opposition parties and movements behind his candidacy. He received an early endorsement from the Union of Communist Parties, as well as a reluctant one from the Russian Communist Workers Party.

By the end of February, Zyuganov had secured the backing of the three largest leftist political organizations that had failed to win any seats in the 1995 legislative elections. These were the Labour Russia, Agrarian Party of Russia and Power to the People. The far-left Labour Russia's leader, Viktor Anpilov, had originally stated that he would seek-out a candidate that promised to liquidate the office of the presidency, restore Soviet power, and reverse all privatization. Zyuganov had not publicly promised to pursue any of Anpilov's stated criteria. Nonetheless, in early January, Anpilov reversed his stance at the 5th Party Congress of the Communist Labor Russia party, announcing that his party would support Zyuganov's candidacy. The Agrarian Party's leader, Mikhail Lapshin, announced in the final week of January that his party was also going to back Zyuganov. Power to the People's head, Nikolai Ryzhkov (who had been Yeltsin's main opponent in the 1991 election), announced his party's support of Zyuganov in early February.

At the start of the election campaign, Zyuganov had the strongest base of support of any candidate. By securing such broad support so early in the campaign, Zyuganov helped to solidify his position as a frontrunner and as the leading opposition candidate.

=== Campaign strategy ===
Zyuganov and his political advisors were convinced that all Russian voters existed somewhere on a venn-diagram of political ideologies consisting of democrats, communists or nationalists. They believed that the three ideologies were about equal in their membership. Thus, Zyuganov and his advisors were convinced that by securing the support of the latter two groups, he would be able to win the election. Heading into the 1996 election season, the prospects of such as strategy seemed rather strong. If Zyuganov could rely on the support of the twenty-one million voters that had voted CPRF and Russia's two other communist parties in the 1995 parliamentary election, as well as the eight million voters who had voted for Russia's various nationalist parties (not including Zhirinovsky's LDPR), he would be able to win the first round of the election and secure himself as the frontrunner to win the second round.

Zyuganov benefited, overall, from the weak field of candidates in the election. The incumbent Boris Yeltsin held single-digit approval ratings at the start of the campaign. Polling showed that most Russians believed that they had been better off when they were under socialist rule than they were now under Yeltsin's. While both Alexander Lebed and Grigory Yavlinsky defeated Zyuganov in hypothetical polling for the second-round, neither of their campaigns had reasonable odds of making it beyond the first round. Zyuganov was so strongly viewed as a front runner that when he attended the February 1996 World Economic Forum in Davos, Switzerland, Western leaders lined up to meet him, viewing him to be the likely be the next president of Russia. Zyuganov's campaign believed it was even possible to win the election outright in the first round of voting.

Zyuganov's campaign aimed to make the election a referendum on the tenure of Yeltsin. Zyuganov positioned his campaign as being against what he considered to be the failed centrism of Boris Yeltsin's presidency. He believed that centrism had been defeated in the 1995 legislative elections, and would again during the 1996 presidential elections. He dubbed Yeltsin's administration the "antinarodnii" (anti-people) regime. The campaign also sought to cast Yeltsin's policies as destabilizing and genocidal, while portraying Zyuganov's own policies as fresh and pragmatic.

At the Communist Party's congress, many prominent figures had expressed concern that the party needed to broaden its base in order to win. Ryzhkov remarked, "Priority No. 1 must be to create a coalition. If the Communist Party joins this battle alone, it will never win." Having already consolidated his base's support early in the year, Zyuganov's campaign shifted their focus on reaching new voters. To do so, Zyuganov's campaign took a strongly nationalist tone.

Zyuganov sought to appeal to a variety of emotions amongst segments of the Russian population, including nationalism, nostalgia for its pre-Revolutionary period, and nostalgia for Soviet socialism. Zyuganov's campaign was convinced that patriotic slogans were nearly all that they needed to win the necessary votes. As a result, the campaign delivered nationalist slogans to voters, rather than addressing "bread and butter" issues.

== Campaigning (first round) ==
=== Early lead ===
Zyuganov started his campaign with a strong lead over Yeltsin.

While the frontrunner, there were challenges that Zyuganov faced. He needed to get his message to the voting public, all without wide access to free media. He also needed to appeal to more centrist voters, without losing his base of support.

In February, when at the World Economic Forum in Davos, Zyuganov worked to try and calm concerned foreign financiers, who were worried of the ramifications of a communist victory in Russia. To do so, he spoke to them using language that made him sound more like a social democrat than a Soviet communist.

On March 4, Zyuganov had become the first candidate officially certified to be placed on the ballot.

Having already secured his left-wing base, Zyuganov now desired to strengthen his support from nationalist groups. He began gesturing towards the nationalist opposition, meeting with most key figures and groups of Russia's nationalist opposition, with the exception of Vladimir Zhirinovsky. Before, and early into, the campaign, Zyuganov persuaded nationalist figures such as former vice-president Alexander Rutskoy (a leading figure amongst nationalists), Sergei Baburin (an important nationalist figure in the Russian legislature, and leader of the Russian All-People's Union) and Stanislav Govorukhin to support his candidacy, convincing them that no patriotic alternative to his candidacy was available and that without partnership with the communists, it would be impossible for nationalists to have a candidate they supported win the presidential election. Zyuganov partnered with Ryzhkov to form the Bloc of National and Patriotic Forces (sometimes referred to as the "popular-patriotic bloc"), a coalition of nationalist and communist organizations. More than 70 separate organizations had joined by early April, and by the end of the election more than 136 organizations had joined.

At his campaign stops, Zyuganov was mindful to emphasize that he considered himself to be, not the candidate of the Communist Party, but the candidate of a bloc of nationalist and socialist associations.

=== The tide turns ===
Zyuganov had originally benefited from the fact that the Communists' role in the legislature was far more moderate than many feared it would be. However, on March 15 the Communist Party acted in the State Duma to pass a largely symbolic non-binding resolution denouncing the Belavezha Accords. This was intended to be a purely symbolic measure, meaningless except to remind Russians of the assertion that Yeltsin had overridden the will of the people in breaking-up the Soviet Union. Soon after the resolution passed, Yeltsin attacked the communists, insinuating that, by declaring the Belavezha Accords to be illegal, the Communists were declaring Russia itself to be an illegitimate state. Yeltsin condemned the resolution as being both scandalous and unconstitutional. Yeltsin declared, "I will allow no attempts to undermine Russian statehood and destabilize the country." In actuality, the passage of the resolution had played right into Yeltsin's trap. Yeltsin's aides had allegedly laid the groundwork for the vote to succeed by giving nationalists in the Duma the go-ahead to vote with the Communists and by coordinating the proceedings so that only Yeltsin's least persuasive allies in parliament spoke out against the resolution. It became clear that what had originally been meant as an inconsequential and purely symbolic resolution had acquired some very real ramifications. The resolution positioned Zyuganov as an extremist per the perception of the Russian Public. Soon after the resolution passed, polling showed it to be highly unpopular, with less than a third of Russians approving of it. The Communist Party failed to effectively respond to the backlash. In fact, during the campaign, the deputy chairman of the Communist Party might have worsened the damage by declaring, "The death of communism never happened...the Soviet Union never collapsed, people still think of themselves as Soviets."

In spite of this development, Zyuganov persisted in campaigning as he had before, traveling the country delivering many of long, often pessimistic, stump speeches. However, this was to little avail, as Yeltsin's numbers rose while Zyuganov's fell. In fact, by April, a number of polls showed Yeltsin leading Zyuganov for the first time. However, with Zyuganov still leading in numerous other polls, Communists continued operating under the assumption that Zyuganov was still the favorite to win.

By May, Yeltsin's position in the polls had universally evened-out with Zyuganov's. Quite consequentially, polling also showed that the electorate no longer trusted Zyuganov to be any more successful in dealing with the conflict in Chechnya than Yeltsin. The highly unpopular Chechen War had once been thought to be the issue that would guarantee Yeltsin's loss in the election. This was no longer the case.

Both Zyuganov and Yeltsin maintained busy campaign travel schedules. While Yeltsin's campaign schedule included visits to areas with electorates that were regarded to be strongly communist, Zyuganov largely avoided campaigning before hostile or ambivalent audiences. While he did manage to make a handful of trips to areas that had weaker communist support, Zyuganov largely held rallies with audiences that were predominately composed of enthusiastic supporters rather than speaking to undecided voters.

=== End of the first round ===
In the run-up to the first round of voting, rallies were held by communist supporters. This included a rally held by Viktor Anpilov in Moscow's Lubyanka Square.

Zyuganov placed second behind Yeltsin, and advanced to the second round of election.

== Campaigning (second round) ==
In the second round of the election, Zyuganov struggled to organize a coalition of support to defeat Yeltsin. Since, in the first round, Zyuganov had failed to capture a greater percentage of the vote than the Communist Party had captured in the 1995 legislative elections, it became apparent that he needed to widen his appeal. He sought to form allegiances with candidates that were eliminated after the first round. However, his hopes failed to materialize, as many of those candidates quickly gave their support to Yeltsin.

With limited resources, and a very brief campaign period, Zyuganov's team urged him to soften his image with sentimental television commercials. However, Zyuganov was reluctant to film commercials that were pitched to him. Zyuganov's team also urged him to focus on issues while minimizing his mentions of Communist ideology (which was off-putting to many voters).

Trailing Yeltsin, and with very little time to overcome this deficit, Zyuganov all but resigned to the likelihood that he would lose to Yeltsin. He refused to commit the persistent energy and effort he would have been necessary for him to stand a chance of winning the runoff. Rather than making any significant effort to shake-up the race in the period between the first and second rounds, Zyuganov stayed the course by continuing with the campaign style that he had used (and fallen short with) in the first round. This approach had been criticized for being relatively inactive, unexciting, and antiquated.

=== Outcome ===
Zyuganov was handed a decisive defeat in the election, losing to Yeltsin by nearly ten million votes.

==== Concession ====
On the night of the election, after being defeated, Zyuganov held a press conference. He expressed his displeasure over what he proclaimed to have been the "crude" inequities and ruinous price" of the presidential campaign. However he also, with visible emotion, conceded the election to Yeltsin, congratulating him on his victory. He ruled out the possibility that he would orchestrate any street protests to challenge the results of the election.

Zyuganov, finding a positive spin on his defeat, declared that the election demonstrated a two-party political system was emerging in Russia and that the political might of the Communist-led campaign alliance could no longer be ignored by the Yeltsin administration.

==== Red Belt ====
Red Belt as evidenced on the electoral map of the second round of the election. Federal subjects which Zyuganov won in the second round of voting are colored in red.

The election map reflected the existence of the so-called Red Belt. Most of the people living in the Red Belt were either industrial or agricultural workers who had high levels of support for communism and the USSR. Thus, these southern regions of the nation were more willing to vote in support of the communist opposition than wealthier zones in the North. Polling had shown Zyuganov to have his greatest support amongst both poorer and rural Russians.

== Policy positions ==
Zyuganov's rhetoric was widely considered to be nationalist. Rather than moving to the center and appealing to a broader demographic, Zyuganov delivered speeches in his campaign that outlined a platform which appealed to faithful communist supporters. However, portions of his campaign's official platform were more "moderate leftist" than pure communist.

Zyuganov was generally regarded as conservative in the sense that he favored preserving/restoring much of Russia's traditional communist governance. Zyuganov's anti-reform and pro-communist stances offered a contrast against Yeltsin's pro-reform and anti-communist stances. He was seen as offering a nationalist opposition to Yeltsin. While Yelstin was seen to bolster the causes of centrists, Zyuganov was seen to champion the causes of nationalists.

== Use of media ==
Zyuganov took advantage of the free air time his campaign received in order to air monologues, videos and footage of large Communist rallies he held before packed halls. The Communist Party could not afford to buy extra airtime, and thus were largely unable to run television advertisements.

News coverage of Zyuganov was negatively biased, as Russian media oligarchs heavily favored Yeltsin's candidacy. The media painted a picture of a fateful choice for Russia, a choice between Yeltsin and a "return to totalitarianism." The oligarchs even played up the threat of civil war if a Communist were elected president.

One weakness of Zyuganov's campaign operation was its that it weakly marketed his candidacy, largely failing to promote it with appealing slogans.

In May, in response to bias by the media, the Communist Party declared they would not spend campaign funds on advertising in national media, and would instead focus on advertising in regional press outlets and on funding door-to-door leafleting.

== See also ==
- Gennady Zyuganov presidential campaign, 2000
- Gennady Zyuganov presidential campaign, 2008
- Gennady Zyuganov presidential campaign, 2012
