= List of chairmen of the Council of People's Deputies of Kemerovo =

The Chairman of the Council of People's Deputies of Kemerovo is the presiding officer of that legislature.

== Office-holders ==
Name	Took office	Left office
Aman Tuleyev	April 5, 1994	January 16, 1997
Aleksandr Filatov	1997	1999
Gennady Dyadya	April 27, 1999	December 26, 2007
Faina Konstatinova	December 26, 2007	2009
Nikolay Shatilov	October 12, 2009 or October 21, 2008	September 17, 2013
Evgeniy Kosyanenko	September 17, 2013	September 18, 2016
Aleksei Sinitsyn	October 7, 2016	April 10, 2018
Aman Tuleyev	April 10, 2018	September 14, 2018
Vyacheslav Petrov	September 14, 2018	October 7, 2021
Aleksey Zelenin	October 7, 2021	
