= Gennady Zyuganov 2008 presidential campaign =

Russian political campaign

- Campaign: 2008 Russian presidential election
- Candidate: Gennady Zyuganov; First Secretary of the Central Committee of the Communist Party of the Russian Federation (1993-present); Leader of the Communist Party of the Russian Federation in the State Duma (1993-present); Member of the State Duma (1993-present)
- Affiliation: Communist Party of the Russian Federation

The Gennady Zyuganov presidential campaign, 2008 was the presidential campaign of Gennady Zyuganov in the 2008 election. This was the third presidential campaign of Zyuganov, who had been a candidate in both the 1996 and 2000 elections.

== Background and early developments ==
In October 2005, Zyuganov indicated that he would run for president in 2008, making him the second person to enter the race for the Kremlin following former Prime Minister Mikhail Kasyanov. According to one report, Zyuganov pledged to quadruple pensions and state salaries, should he be elected.

== Campaigning ==
In January 2008, Zyuganov challenged Dmitry Medvedev, Putin's chosen successor, to an open, televised debate, but Medvedev refused to take part, citing lack of time.

In the presidential election on March 2, 2008, Zyuganov garnered 17.76% of the vote and came in second to Medvedev's 70.23%.

== See also ==
- Gennady Zyuganov presidential campaign, 1996
- Gennady Zyuganov presidential campaign, 2000
- Gennady Zyuganov presidential campaign, 2012
