= Gennady Zyuganov 2012 presidential campaign =

- Campaign: 2012 Russian presidential election
- Candidate: Gennady Zyuganov; First Secretary of the Central Committee of the Communist Party of the Russian Federation (1993-present); Leader of the Communist Party of the Russian Federation in the State Duma (1993-present); Member of the State Duma (1993-present)
- Affiliation: Communist Party of the Russian Federation

The Gennady Zyuganov presidential campaign, 2012 was the presidential campaign of Gennady Zyuganov in the 2012 Russian presidential election. Zyuganov had also been a candidate for president in the 1996, 2000, and 2008 elections.

== Campaigning ==
In September 2011, Zyuganov became the Communist Party of the Russian Federation's candidate for the 2012 presidential election. Zyuganov declared that the election would be a referendum on "a 20-year experiment" in the liberalization of the Russian political sphere. Zyuganov referred to the existing government as a "gang of folks who...have humiliated the country."

In the 2012 Russian presidential election on 4 March 2012, Zyuganov once again came in second place by receiving 17% of the vote.

== Positions ==
Zyuganov promised a return to socialism and an end to Russia's economic decline.

== See also ==
- Gennady Zyuganov presidential campaign, 1996
- Gennady Zyuganov presidential campaign, 2000
- Gennady Zyuganov presidential campaign, 2008
