= Vyacheslav Petrov =

Russian politician

Vyacheslav Petrov MP
- Вячеслав Петров
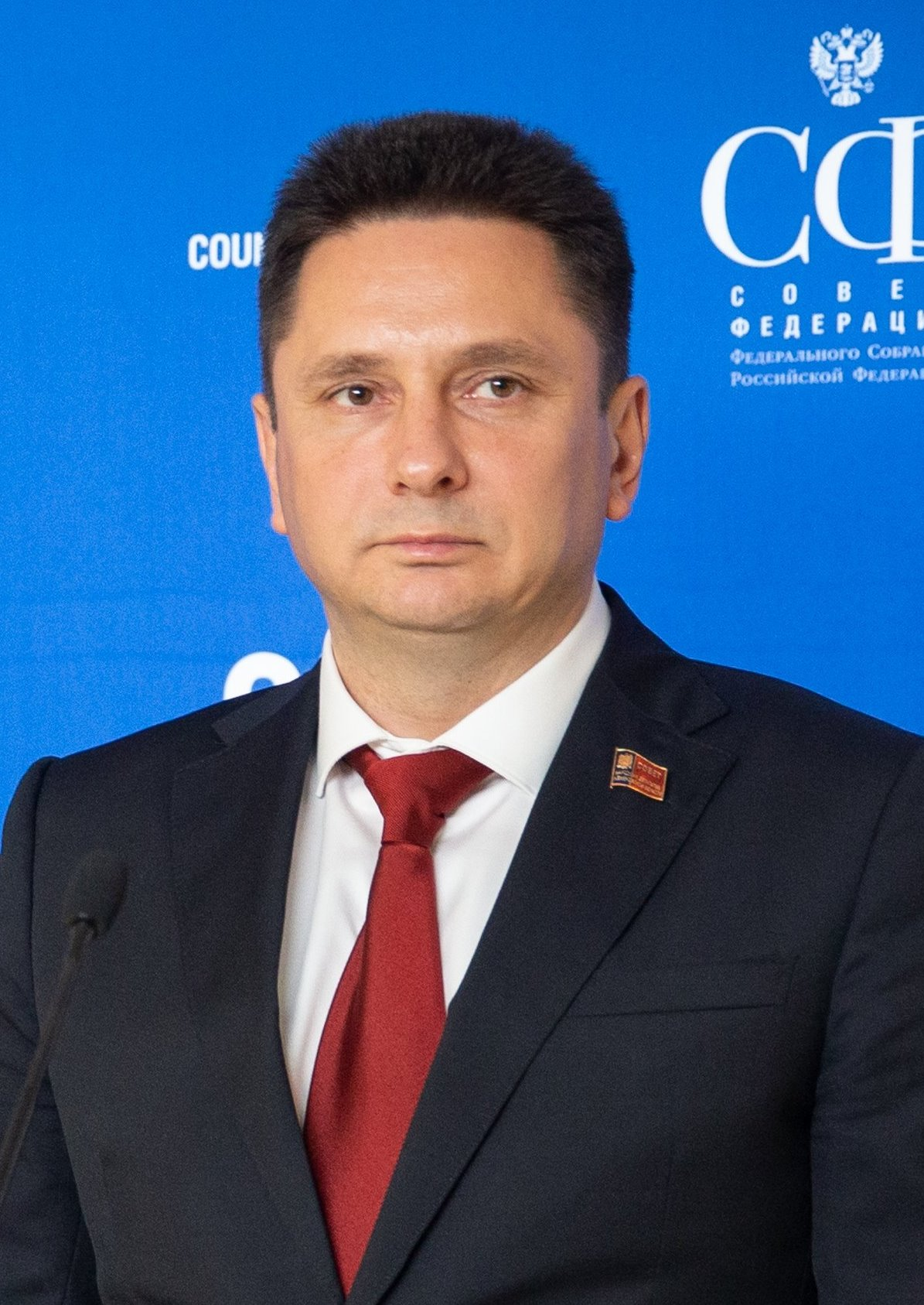
- Petrov in 2019

Member of the State Duma (Party List Seat)
- Incumbent
- Assumed office 12 October 2021

Chairman of the Legislative Assembly of Kemerovo Oblast
- In office 14 September 2018 – 7 October 2021
- Preceded by: Aman Tuleyev
- Succeeded by: Aleksey Zelenin

Personal details
- Born: 17 August 1969 (age 57) Novokuznetsk, Kemerovo Oblast, RSFSR, USSR
- Party: United Russia
- Education: Kemerovo State Medical Institute; Kemerovo State University

Vyacheslav Anatolievich Petrov (Russian: Вячеслав Анатольевич Петров; born 17 August 1969) is a Russian politician who is a member of the State Duma of the VIII convocation, a member of the United Russia faction, and a member of the State Duma Committee on Regional Policy and Local Self-Government.

He had also served as the Chairman as member of the Legislative Assembly of Kemerovo Oblast from 2018 to 2021.

== Biography ==
Vyacheslav Petrov was born on 17 August 1969, in Novokuznetsk.

In 1986, he graduated from secondary school No. 60 and entered the medical faculty of the Kemerovo State Medical Academy.

In 1992, he graduated from the Faculty of Medicine and was assigned to residency at the Department of Oncology, where he conducted scientific activities during his studies, but after graduation he went into business.

From 1992 to 1998, he was the President of Insider LLP.

From 1998 to 2001, he was the General Director of Navigator Company OJSC.

Between 2001 and 2011, he was the General Director of E-Light-Telecom LLC, Good Line trademark.

In 2003, he graduated from the Faculty of Law of the Kemerovo State University.

From 2011 to 2012, Petrov was the Deputy Chairman of the Kemerovo City Council of People's Deputies.

From 2012 to 2013, he was the Head of the Regional Executive Committee of the Kemerovo regional branch of the All-Russian political party "United Russia".

From 2013 to 2018, he was the Chairman of the Board of Directors of E-Light-Telecom LLC.

From 2011 to 2013, he was a member of the Kemerovo city council, representing the 4th constituency of the Zavodskoy district.

In the elections in 2013, Petrov was elected to the Kemerovo Oblast Council for the Leninsky single-mandate constituency.

On a single voting day on 9 September 2018, Petrov was elected a member and chairman of the Council of People's Deputies of the Kemerovo Region. The parliament was renamed to the Legislative Assembly of the Kemerovo Region - Kuzbass, as of 1 December 2019.

On 19 September 2021, Petrov was elected to the State Duma of the VIII convocation.

=== Sanctions ===
He was sanctioned by the UK government in 2022 in relation to the Russo-Ukrainian War.

== Family ==
He is married and is raising two sons.
