= Gennady Zyuganov 2000 presidential campaign =

Russian presidential campaign

- Campaign: 2000 Russian presidential election
- Candidate: Gennady Zyuganov; First Secretary of the Central Committee of the Communist Party of the Russian Federation (1993-present); Leader of the Communist Party of the Russian Federation in the State Duma (1993-present); Member of the State Duma (1993-present)
- Affiliation: Communist Party of the Russian Federation
- Key people: Sergey Glazyev (chief economic advisor)

The Gennady Zyuganov presidential campaign, 2000 was the presidential campaign of Gennady Zyuganov in the 2000 election. This was the second presidential campaign of Zyuganov, who had previously run in the 1996 election (in which he had been a strong contender and had ultimately placed second).

== Background and early developments ==
After losing the 1996 presidential election (which he had originally been the strong frontrunner for) to Boris Yeltsin, Zyuganov declared that the 1996 election nevertheless had demonstrated that a two-party political system was emerging in Russia and that the political might of the Communist-led campaign alliance could no longer be ignored by the Yeltsin administration.

By 1999, Zyuganov had emerged as the evident frontrunner in every poll for the first round of the pending 2000 presidential election. However, polls also indicated that he would be unable to win an outright majority in the first round (which would be necessary for him to avoid a runoff), and that he was almost certain to lose against any prospective non-Communist opponent in a runoff.

At this same time, Zyuganov and Yavlinsky were seen as the only two prospective candidates that were supported by a strong constituency and a national party.

However, by the autumn of 1999 then-Prime Minister Vladimir Putin had overtaken Zyuganov as leading candidate in the polls.

== Campaigning ==
Zyuganov (averaging 22% in polls) ultimately proved to be the only strong challenger to Putin.

Zyuguanov's Communist Party conducted an orthodox campaign, relying heavily on grassroots door-to-door campaigning and a network of supportive Communist-aligned newspapers to spread its message. Zyuganov made little use of television advertising. The limited televised advertisements his campaign did run generally focused on his platform.

Zyuganov ultimately outperformed polls, which had largely predicted that he would receive roughly 20% of the vote, and instead received 29% with 22 million votes. Nonetheless, he failed to force Putin into a runoff.

== Positions ==
Zyuganov agreed with Putin’s handling of the Second Chechen War.

Zyuganov advocated a significantly expanded social safety net.

His chief economist, Sergey Glazyev, promised that Russia 10% annual growth under Zyuganov's economic policies.

His platform proposed the creation of a "regulated market", in which the state would hold a controlling share in certain key sectors of the economy, such as the energy, transport and military industries.

In an adaption of trickle-down economics, Zyuganov proposed cutting taxes on domestic industry in half. He also proposed cuts to energy, transport and communications tariffs.

Zyuganov advocated instating a state monopoly on alcohol and tobacco. He promised to deliver higher minimum wages. His proposed minimum wage increases would equal $105 per month for doctors and teachers and $35 for others, a significant increase from the existing minimum wage, which equaled just $14.

== See also ==
- Gennady Zyuganov presidential campaign, 1996
- Gennady Zyuganov presidential campaign, 2008
- Gennady Zyuganov presidential campaign, 2012
