= Alexander Filatov =

Russian politician

- Александр Филатов
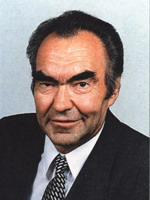

Chairman of the Council of People's Deputies of Kemerovo Oblast
- In office 17 January 1997 – 27 April 1999
- Preceded by: Aman Tuleyev
- Succeeded by: Gennady Dyudyayev

Personal details
- Born: 5 September 1940 (age 85) Leninsk-Kuznetsky, Novosibirsk Oblast, RSFSR, Soviet Union (modern Kemerovo Oblast, Russia)

Alexander Alekseyevich Filatov (Russian: Александр Алексеевич Филатов; born September 5, 1940) is a Russian politician.

Filatov graduated from the Kuzbass Polytechnic Institute. He worked as a miner in the city of Polysayevo. From 1987 to 1990 he headed the mining inspection. From March to August 1990 he was the first secretary of the Leninsk-Kuznetsky city committee of the CPSU. He was elected to the Kemerovo Oblast Council in 1993.

From 1997 to 1999 Filatov was Chairman of the Council of People’s Deputies of Kemerovo Oblast and ex officio member of the Federation Council of Russia.
