= Vladimir Bryntsalov =

Russian businessman and politician

- Владимир Брынцалов
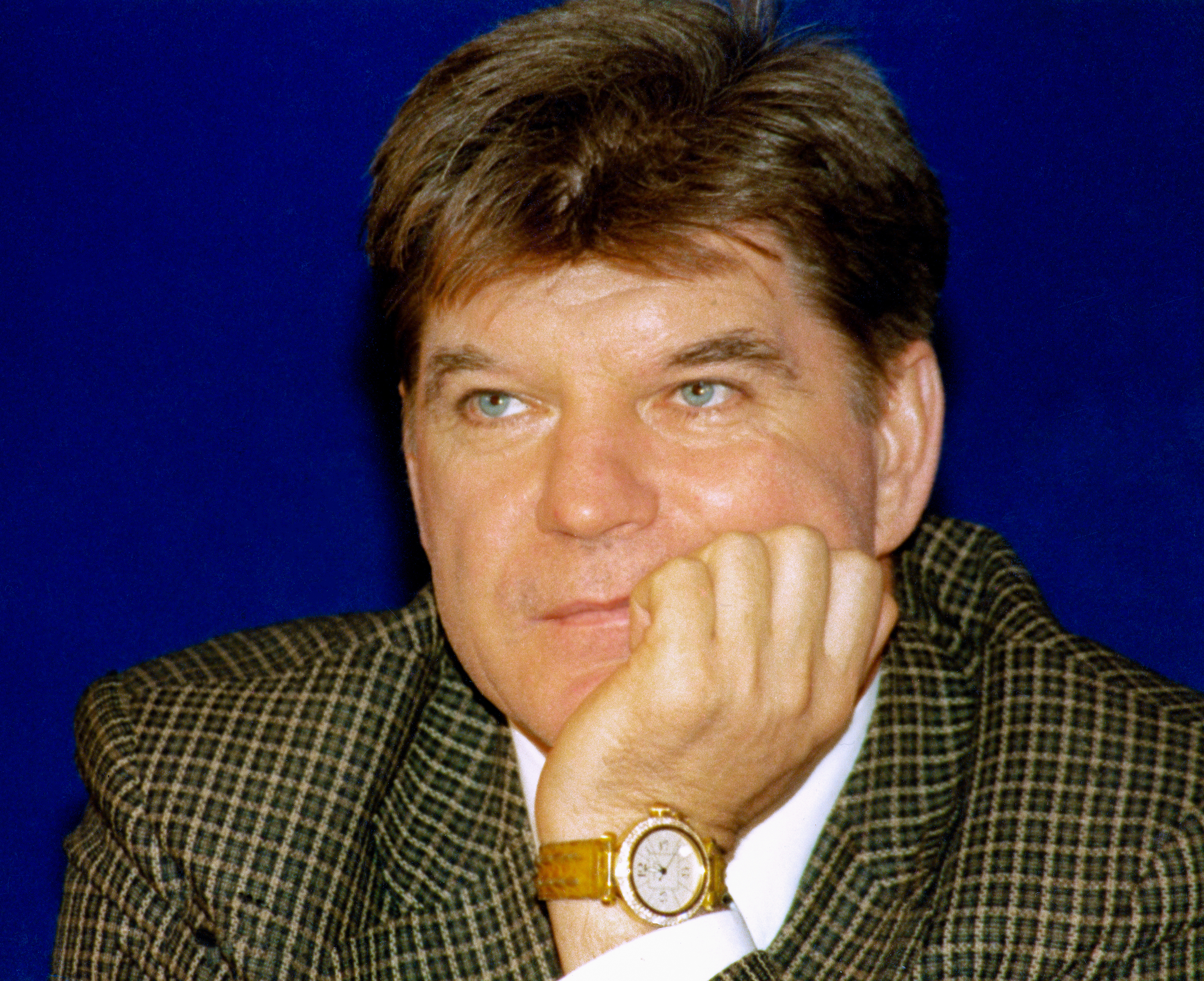
- Bryntsalov in 1996
- Born: Vladimir Alexeyevich Bryntsalov; November 23, 1946 (age 79); Cherkessk, RSFSR, USSR
- Occupations: politician businessman
- Political party: Russian Socialist Party (1996-2001)

Vladimir Alexeyevich Bryntsalov (Russian: Влади́мир Алексе́евич Брынца́лов; born November 23, 1946) is a Russian businessman and politician. He is the founder and owner of pharmaceutical company ZAO Bryntsalov A. From 1995 until 2003 he was a deputy in the State Duma of Russia. Bryntsalov was a candidate in the 1996 Russian presidential election. He attempted to run for president again in 2004, but failed to attain ballot access.

== Early life ==
In 1969 Bryntsalov graduated from the Novocherkassk Polytechnic Institute with a degree in Mine Surveying and Geodesy.

Bryntsaloc founded the pharmaceutical company ZAO Bryntsalov A.

== Political career ==
Bryntalov was elected to the State Duma in 1995. He was reelected to the State Duma in 1999 and served in the State Duma until 2003.

=== 1996 presidential campaign ===
Bryntaslov ran as the candidate of the Russian Socialist Party in the 1996 Russian presidential election.

Bryntsalov announced his candidacy with a speech on February 20. In his speech he declared that money was "man's greatest invention".

As a candidate, Brytsalov boasted about his wealth and personality, saying,

I'm rich, I'm strong. I'll teach everybody, and force people to do what they're supposed to do.

Bryntsalov promoted himself with the superlative claim of being "the richest man in Russia". As a candidate, Brytsalov flaunted his wealth by dressing in a flashy wardrobe and wearing an $80,000 Rolex. During his campaign he was often accompanied by his wife, who was noticeably twenty years his minor. In addition to flamboyantly flaunting his wealth, Bryntsalov sought to present himself as a rags to riches success story.

Bryntsalov claimed that his leadership would eliminate the country's poverty, promising that, if he were elected, there would be, "no poor pensioners, no poor workers, no poor entrepreneurs, no poor farmers."

His plan, which he dubbed "Russian socialism", was for large companies to begin paying wages comparable to companies in other industrialized nations. The plan anticipated that the employees of the companies would consequentially pay larger income taxes, spend more on consumer goods, and increase their productivity at their jobs. The feasibility of this plan was criticized, as Russian companies were considered to be unable to pay such wages.

Despite being a (recently elected) deputy of the State Duma, Brytsalov did not have a voting-record. In his legislative career, he had very low attendance and extremely little participation.

After he had initially filed his registration, the Central Election Commission 400,000 of his 1.35 million signatures were deemed invalid. Rather than collecting additional signatures (which was still an option, as he had turned-in his registration ahead of the deadline), he appealed the decision to the Supreme Court. Controversially, the Supreme Court found in favor of Bryntsalov and ruled that 170,000 of the contested signatures were indeed valid. These were enough signatures to place Bryntsalov above the required one-million signatures, thus permitting him to be a candidate in the election.

Relatively unknown to the Russian populace, Brytsalov was generally seen as a marginal candidate and was viewed as unlikely to win the election.

=== 2004 presidential campaign ===
Bryntsalov again ran for president in 2004. However, he withdrew from the race in January without having submitted any signatures to register as a candidate.

Bryntsalov was perceived to be supporting Putin and his candidacy was seen as an attempt at putting himself forward a show opponent rather than a true challenger.

== Personal life ==
Bryntsalov's first wife was to Lydia Tikhonovna Bryntsalova. Together they have a daughter, Natalya (born 1971).

His marriage is to Natalya Bryntsalova (born in 1967). He has two children with her, a son Alexey (1992) and daughter Alena (1994). Natalya decided to finally part with Bryntsalov, he left her his property in Monte Carlo.

Bryntaslov'a nephew Igor Bryntsalov is the Chairman of the Moscow Oblast Duma having been elected to the post on December 15, 2011.
