= Aman Tuleyev =

Russian politician (1944–2023)

- Аман Тулеев
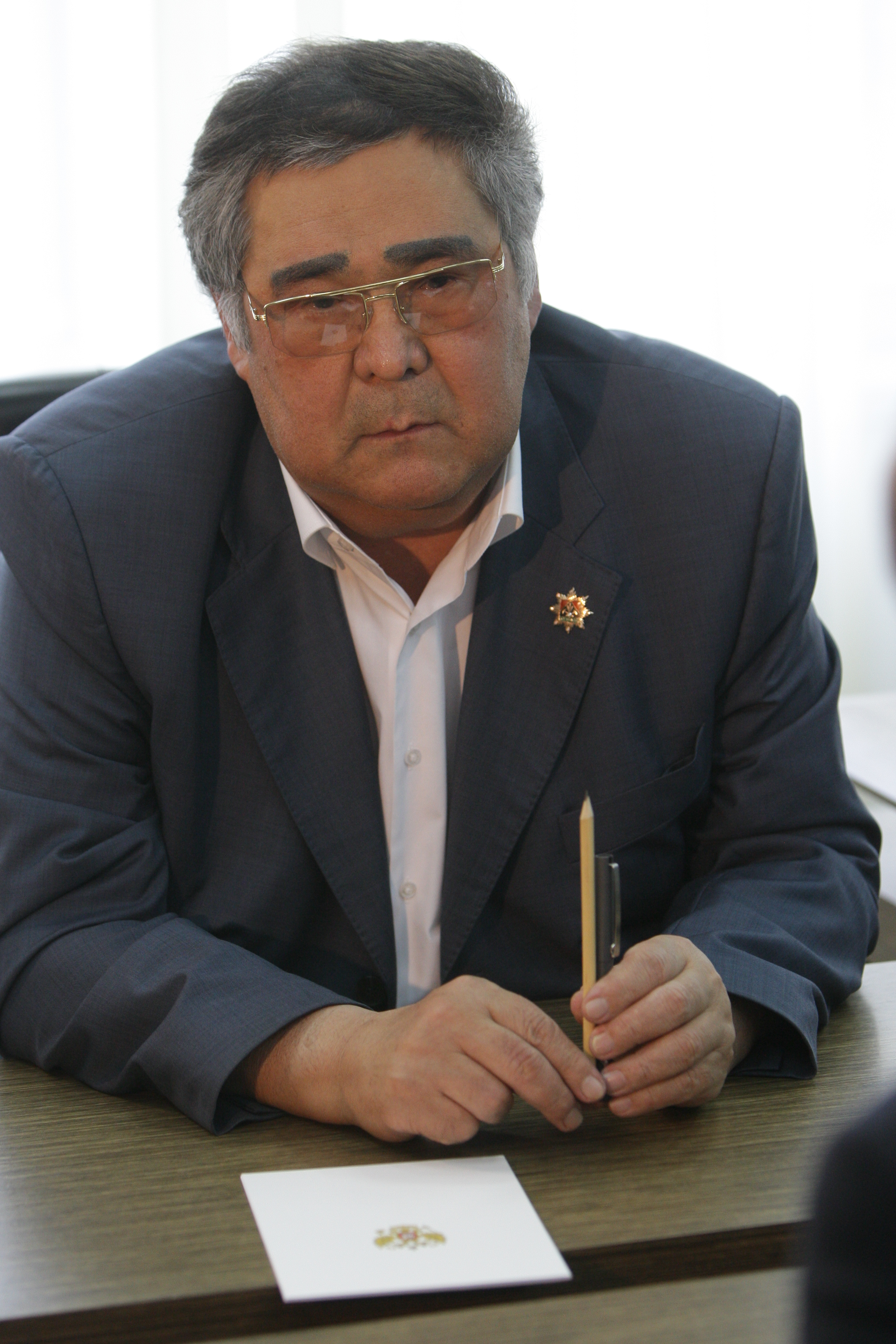
- Tuleyev in 2020

Chairman of the Council of People's Deputies of Kemerovo Oblast
- In office 10 April 2018 – 14 September 2018
- Preceded by: Alexey Sinitsyn
- Succeeded by: Vyacheslav Petrov
- In office 5 April 1994 – 15 July 1996
- Succeeded by: Alexander Filatov

2nd Governor of Kemerovo Oblast
- In office 1 July 1997 – 1 April 2018
- Preceded by: Mikhail Kislyuk
- Succeeded by: Sergey Tsivilyov

Minister for Cooperation with CIS Countries
- In office 22 August 1996 – 1 July 1997
- Prime Minister: Viktor Chernomyrdin
- Preceded by: Valery Serov
- Succeeded by: Anatoly Adamishin

Personal details
- Born: Amangeldy Gumirovich Tuleyev; 13 May 1944 Krasnovodsk, Turkmen SSR, USSR (now Türkmenbaşy, Turkmenistan)
- Died: 20 November 2023 (aged 79)
- Party: United Russia (2005–2023)

Amangeldy Gumirovich "Aman" Tuleyev (Russian: Амангельды (Аман) Гумирович Тулеев, Kazakh: Амангелді Молдағазыұлы Төлеев, Amangeldı Moldağazyūly Töleev; 13 May 1944 – 20 November 2023) was a Russian statesman. He served as governor of Kemerovo Oblast from 1997 to 2018 and was the chairman of the Council of People's Deputies of the Kemerovo Oblast briefly in 2018.

Tuleyev ran for President of Russia in 1991, 1996 (withdrawing during the campaign) and 2000, coming fourth in both 1991 and 2000.

== Career in the Soviet Union ==
Tuleyev was born to a Kazakh father and a half-Tatar half-Bashkir mother in Krasnovodsk, Turkmen SSR, USSR.

Early at his career, Tuleyev worked as a railway engineer. In 1964, he graduated from Tikhoretsky Railway Technical College with distinction. He then moved to Siberia, to be a railway clerk at the small railway settlement of Mundybash in the Kemerovo area, where he became a stationmaster in 1969. In 1973, he graduated from the Novosibirsk Institute of Engineers as a railway engineer specialized in communication. From 1973 to 1978 he was railway station chief in the town of Mezhdurechensk. From 1978 to 1985 he worked at Novokuznetsk Railway Station, first as an assistant, and then as the chief of the Novokuznetsk branch of the Kemerovo Railway. In 1985, Tuleyev was appointed head of the Department of Transport and Communication in Kemerovo and in 1989 he became head of the Kemerovo Railway System.

In 1990, he switched to politics and was elected to the Parliament of the Russian Soviet Federative Socialist Republic (RSFSR) from Kuzbas. In March 1990, Tuleyev was elected chairman of the Kemerovo Regional Soviet.

=== 1991 Russian presidential campaign ===
Tuleyev was a presidential candidate in the 1991 Russian presidential election. His running mate was Viktor Bocharov. At the time of his 1991 campaign, Tuleyev was regarded as a somewhat popular reformist. He was perceived at the time to be a left-wing populist.

Tuleyev aimed to siphon voters away from Boris Yeltsin in Eastern Russia. He particularly hoped to garner votes from miners, a demographic which had developed significant qualms with some of Yeltsin's recent actions in granting concessions to Gorbachev over the issue of Russia's natural resources. Yeltsin's campaign attempted to combat Tuleyev's efforts to court miners by accusing him of being a candidate of the Communist Party's machine masquerading as a "favorite son" of miners. Tuleyev also appealed to non-ethnically-Russian voters.

As a candidate, Tuleyev championed local autonomy, incremental economic reform and social defence. Tuleyev placed fourth in the election, receiving 5,417,464 votes (7% of the overall vote). He carried a 42% plurality of the Kemerovo Oblast's vote. However, his lead there was narrow enough that early returns had shown Yeltsin leading him there.

=== Late-Soviet politics ===
Tuleyev supported the GKChP in the August 1991 Soviet coup attempt.

== Post-Soviet political career ==
=== Early 1990s ===
Through most of the 1990s, he was a prominent politician of the Communist Party of the Russian Federation. In January 1992, in protest against the policies of Yegor Gaidar Tuleyev offered his resignation from the post of chairman of the Kemerovo Oblast Regional Council. However, the deputies voted to refuse his resignation.

In October 1993, Tuleyev took the side of the Parliament against Boris Yeltsin. After the events of that month, the Kemerovo regional Soviet of People's Deputies was disbanded, like many other regional branches of government in Siberia and elsewhere in Russia. Tuleyev however, decided to remain active in politics, and for this purpose, he created a new political movement in the Kuzbas, called "People's power. Tuleyev Block." In 1993, Tuleyev got the majority of the votes in Kuzbas and was elected to the new Russian Parliament. A year later, he was voted Chairman of the Council of People's Deputies of Kemerovo.

=== 1996 presidential campaign ===
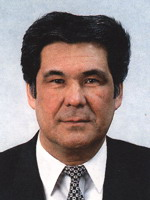
Tuleyev as a Member of the Federation Council, 1996

Tuleyev ran for president again in the 1996 election. However, he ultimately dropped out before the day of the election. During his 1996 campaign, Tuleyev styled himself as a "muslim communist". However, despite being Muslim, Tuleyev failed to receive backing from major Muslim organizations. Islamic Cultural Center and the Union of Muslims of Russia backed Yeltsin and Yur backed Grigory Yavlinsky.

Considered to be charismatic, energetic, and well as well-liked by the Communist Party's base. He turned-in his signatures the day before the deadline. He was considered to be a fallback communist candidate, in case Gennady Zyuganov's candidacy faltered. Rather than campaigning to persuade voters to support himself, he instead was largely campaigning to dissuade voters from supporting Yeltsin and urged voters to support the so-called "popular patriotic bloc".

Tuleyev's rhetoric straddled between hard-line communism and social-democracy. Generally a hard-liner, he had nonetheless occasionally taken moderate stances, such as seeking tax cuts. Tuleyev accused Yeltsin of making populist pledges that would lead to inflation. Tuleyev was opposed to renationalizing enterprises already sold to private owners, and argued the issue is "not how to divide the pie, but how to make the pie bigger." Tuleyev's positions centered upon communism and a disciplined (uncorrupt) government.

Tuleyev dropped out of the race on 8 June and endorsed Zyuganov.

Despite the fact that Tuleyev dropped out of the race before the election, he had already been on the ballot during a portion of the early voting period.

=== Late-1990s ===
From August 1996 to June 1997, he was a Russian minister responsible for relations with the CIS in Viktor Chernomyrdin's Second Cabinet. In this capacity, he proposed plans for a union between Russia and Belarus.

In July 1999, it was rumored that he had accepted baptism in the Russian Orthodox Church. Although he denied being religious at all and claimed that an earlier visit to Mecca was not a pilgrimage, the Islamic Shura of Chechnya, under Sharia law, condemned him to death for apostasy.

=== 2000 presidential campaign ===
Tuleyev ran for president again in the 2000 election.

In 2000, Tuleyev was opposed to his fellow-Communist Zyuganov (who was running again), and thus was not acting as a "backup candidate" like he had in the previous election. In fact, it was speculated that Putin's camp had convinced Tuleyev to run for the purpose of siphoning support away from Zyuganov. Tuleyev, in an appearance on NTV, essentially stopped short of endorsing Putin. Tuleyev served as an attack dog, directly criticizing Zyuganov and the Communist Party.

His campaign platform focused on radically shifting the balance of power between the federal government and Russia's regional governments. This entailed a proposal to reduce the number of subjects from 89 to a mere 35, and for the chief executives of the subjects to be appointed rather than elected.

His campaign ran ads touting his successes as governor of Kemerovo.

His support was believed to be between one and two percent of the electorate. Tuleyev was seen as unlikely to (even optimistically) garner more than 5% of the vote.

Tuleyev ultimately placed fourth, receiving 2,217,361 votes (3% of the overall vote). He carried a plurality of the Kemerovo Oblast's vote.

=== 2000s and 2010s ===
In 2000, he was expelled from the nationalist-communist umbrella organization called Popular-Patriotic Union.

In 2000, Viktor Tikhonov, the brother of the former Olympic champion in biathlon, and former governor candidate of Moscow Oblast, Alexander Tikhonov, was charged with plotting Tuleyev's assassination and sentenced to 4 years in prison. The person who is claimed to have ordered the assassination, Mikhail Zhivilo (who has since received political asylum in France), had had a business dispute with a Tuleyev ally. In the same year, Tuleyev received his doctorate.

In December 2003, he led the electoral list of United Russia in Kuzbass. In November 2005, he formally joined the United Russia, one of the last regional governors to do so. The same year, Vladimir Putin extended Tuleyev's term as governor to 2010. In 2015, Tuleyev was re-elected.

Tuleyev was criticised for creating a near-to-authoritarian regime in Kemerovo Oblast.

Tuleyev resigned from his position as governor after a devastating mall fire in Kemerovo. Previously it was thought that he would resign due to health problems in May 2018, following his 74th birthday.

In April 2018, Tuleyev became the chairman of the Council of People's Deputies (legislative assembly) of Kemerovo oblast.

== Personal life ==
His mother, Munira Fayzovna Vlasova (maiden name Nasyrova) died in 2001, while his father, Moldagazy Kaldybaevich Tuleyev, died in World War II, before Aman was born. Young Aman was brought up by his ethnic Russian stepfather, Innokenty Ivanovich Vlasov. Tuleyev was married to Elvira Fedorovna Tuleyeva, an ethnic Russian. They have two sons: Dmitry, who lives in Novosibirsk, and currently works as a Manager of the Federal Highways, and Andrey (died in a car accident in 1998); grandchildren – Andrey (1999) and Stanislav, Tatiana (2005).

Aman Tuleyev died on 20 November 2023, at the age of 79.
