= Party of Workers' Self-Government =

Party of Workers' Self-Government Партия самоуправления трудящихся
- Abbreviation: PST (English); ПСТ (Russian)
- Leader: Levon Chakhmakhchyan
- Founder: Svyatoslav Fyodorov
- Founded: 28 January 1995
- Registered: 6 March 1995
- Dissolved: 6 March 2006
- Headquarters: Moscow, Russia
- Newspaper: Third estate
- Ideology: Social democracy
- Political position: Centre-left
- Colours: Red
- Slogan: "From wage labor to free" (Russian: "От наёмного труда - к свободному")

The Party of Workers' Self-Government (Russian: Партия самоуправления трудящихся, Partiya samoupravleniya trudyashchikhsya, PST) was a political party in Russia.

== History ==
The party was established by Svyatoslav Fyodorov. In the 1995 parliamentary elections the party received 4% of the proportional representation vote, failing to cross the electoral threshold. However, it won a single constituency seat in the State Duma. Fyodorov contested the presidential elections the following year, finishing sixth out eleven candidates with 0.9% of the vote.

The party did not contest any further elections; Fyodorov formed a new alliance, the Andrey Nikolayev and Svyatoslav Fyodorov Bloc, which won one seat.

== Election results ==
=== Presidential ===
Election	Candidate	First round			Second round
Election	Candidate	Votes	%	Rank	Second round
1996	Svyatoslav Fyodorov	699,158	0.93	6th	Endorsed Boris Yeltsin
2000	Did not participate				
2004	Did not participate				

=== State Duma ===
Election	Leader	Votes	%	Rank	Seats
1995	Svyatoslav Fyodorov	2,756,954	3.98	8th	1 / 450
1999	Andrey Nikolayev (as Nikolayev–Fyodorov bloc)	371,938	0.56 (▼3.42 pp)	17th	1 / 450
