= Red Belt (Russia) =

Area of post-Soviet Communist support

External images
- Map of results of the 1st round of the presidential elections of 1996
- Map of results of elections to the State Duma in 1999

The Red Belt or Red Zone (Russian: Красный пояс) was a group of Russian regions which gave stable support to the Communist Party of the Russian Federation and other left parties in local and federal elections. The term came into wide use from the mid-1990s after Communist candidates won a number of regions from non-Communist opposition candidates. The "red zone" comprised predominantly agricultural areas of Central Russia, the national republics of the North Caucasus, as well as a number of the southern regions of Siberia and the Far East. The agricultural areas in the "Red Zone" were being privatized while the rest of Russia was a more open market. With the coming to power of Vladimir Putin (Acting President from 31 December 1999) and reduced support for the Communist Party, the "red belt" ceased to exist.

== Reasons ==
In 1999, the regions of the "red zone", according to the analyst Rostislav Turovsky, included the Smolensk, Bryansk, Kaluga, Orel, Kursk, Belgorod, Ryazan, Lipetsk, Tambov, Voronezh, Penza, Ulyanovsk, Saratov, Volgograd and Astrakhan regions. They had a high proportion of agricultural workers, destitute industrial workers, unemployed people and a high degree of conservatism. However, with the economic development of different regions, they are not among the most depressed. Turovsky noted strong support for the Communist Party in the North Caucasus (except in Ingushetia). In the territories and regions of the North Caucasus, a predominantly Russian population of this area support Communist candidates, in his opinion, due to the same reasons as in the rest of the "red zone". In the national republics (Karachay-Cherkessia, Dagestan and North Ossetia) support is due to nostalgia for the Soviet era, when these poor areas experienced ethno-political and socio-economic stability. In the Urals, and to the east of them, Turovsky notes strong pro-communist sentiment in predominantly industrial regions such as Orenburg, Kurgan, Omsk, Novosibirsk, Chita Oblast and Altai Krai, as well as in agricultural areas and in districts of mostly Russian national composition (the Altai Republic, the Ust-Orda Buryat AO and the Jewish AO). Support for the Communists started to weaken once the economic depression of the 1990s ended and both economic and political stability returned in the early 2000s.

== Maps ==
Federal subjects in which the Communist Party won more than the national average (22.39%) in the 1995 legislative election (in red).

Federal subjects in which Communist candidate Gennady Zyuganov won the second round of voting in the 1996 presidential election (in red).

== See also ==
- History of Russia (1991–present)
- Nostalgia for the Soviet Union
- Red wall (British politics)
