= Russian Socialist Party =

Russian Socialist Party Русская социалистическая партия
- Abbreviation: RSP (English); РСП (Russian)
- Leader: Vladimir Bryntsalov
- Founded: 27 April 1996
- Dissolved: 11 July 2001
- Merged into: United Russia
- Headquarters: Moscow, Russia
- Ideology: Russian conservatism Paternalistic conservatism Traditionalism; Social conservatism
- Political position: Right-wing
- Colours: White; Blue; Red
- Slogan: "Government, capital, people" (Russian: "Правительство, капитал, народ")

Website
- bryntsalov.ru

Russian Socialist Party (RSP; Russian: Русская социалистическая партия, romanized: Russkaya sotsialisticheskaya partiya) was a political party in Russia led by Vladimir Bryntsalov.

Despite the leftist-sounding name, the main priorities of the activities indicated in the party's program were the ideas of moderate conservatism, traditionalism, and social orientation. Other value guidelines were most fully presented in other RSP program documents, however, they were not actually translated into practical activities.

The RSP was formed at a Founding Congress on 27 April 1996. Like many other electoral associations of that period, in the second half of the 1990s, the party developed a new version of amendments and additions to its Charter, which was associated with obtaining the status of a political public association. The Russian Socialist Party was registered by the Ministry of Justice of the Russian Federation on 7 December 1998. The chairman of the party during its existence was Vladimir Bryntsalov. In the 1999 Russian legislative election, the Russian Socialist Party received 0.24% of the vote.

As a result, the party did not receive any seats in the State Duma. However, Bryntsalov won the Orekhovo-Zuyevo constituency and joined the "People's Deputy" parliamentary group. In 2001, the party disbanded and joined the United Russia party.
