= 1996 Russian presidential election =

- 16 June 1996 (first round); 3 July 1996 (second round)
- Opinion polls
- Registered: 108,495,023 (first round); 108,589,050 (second round)
- Turnout: 69.67% (first round) ▼5.89pp 68.78% (second round)
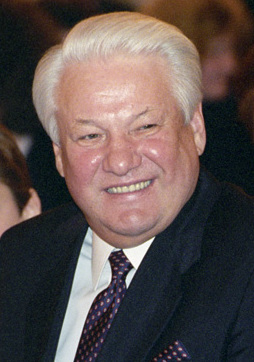

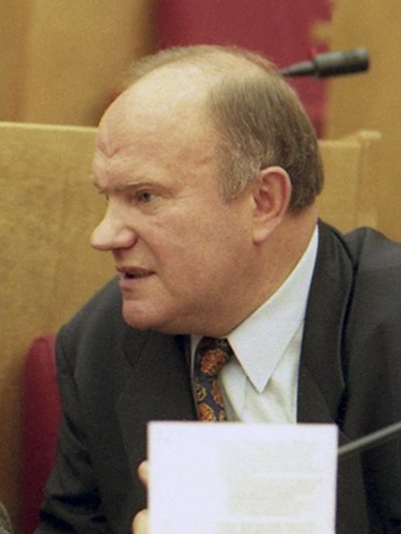
| Nominee | Boris Yeltsin | Gennady Zyuganov |
| Party | Independent | KPRF |
| Popular vote | 40,203,948 | 30,102,288 |
| Percentage | 54.40% | 40.73% |
President before election
Boris Yeltsin
Independent
Elected President
Boris Yeltsin
Independent

Presidential elections were held in Russia on 16 June 1996, with a second round being held on 3 July 1996. It resulted in a victory for the incumbent Russian president Boris Yeltsin, who ran as an independent politician. Yeltsin defeated the Communist Party of the Russian Federation challenger Gennady Zyuganov in the second round, receiving 54.4% of the vote. Yeltsin's second inauguration ceremony took place on 9 August 1996.

Yeltsin would not complete the second term for which he was elected, as he resigned on 31 December 1999, eight months before the scheduled end of his term on 9 August 2000; he was succeeded by his chosen successor, Vladimir Putin, whom he had appointed prime minister of Russia a few months earlier. This was the first presidential election to take place in post-Soviet Russia. As of 2024, this has also been the only Russian presidential election in which no candidate was able to win on the first round, and as such a runoff election was necessary.

Although most contemporaneous reports certified the 1996 election result, the election has been associated with various counts of pro-Yeltsin media bias and foreign influence, as well as allegations of electoral fraud or that it was an unfair election. Critics also argued that Yeltsin had engaged in vote buying by utilizing state finances to fund social programs, to which he responded he was merely doing his duties as president. Others argued that the allegations were exaggerated, and that the then United States government in fact refrained from covert operations and did not grant all of Yeltsin's requests.

== Background ==
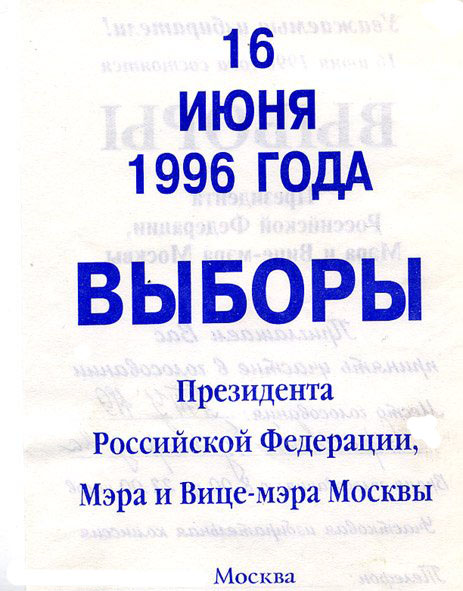
Voter invitation card for the election

In 1991, Boris Yeltsin was elected to a five-year term as president of Russia, which was still a part of the Soviet Union at the time. The next election was scheduled to be held sometime in 1996. In late December 1991, Soviet Russia became a sovereign nation in wake of the dissolution of the Soviet Union. This meant that the scheduled election would now be the first ever presidential election to be held in a fully sovereign Russia.

In a 1993 Russian government referendum question (III), Russian voters rejected holding an early presidential election, and the presidential election remained scheduled to be held in the year 1996. Later in 1993, the Constitution of Russia was adopted. In the constitution, future presidential terms were stipulated to last for four years, meaning that the 1996 election would elect a president to serve a four-year term. When incumbent president Yeltsin launched his re-election campaign in early 1996, he was widely predicted to lose. Public opinion of Yeltsin was at a historical low point. Due to this, there was talk about Yeltsin potentially postponing or canceling the election; he ultimately decided against this.

Shortly before the election campaign, Yeltsin had faced a number of significant political humiliations which harmed his political stature. In the 1995 Russian legislative election, the Communist Party of the Russian Federation (CPRF) had achieved dominance in the State Duma. On 9 January 1996, Chechen rebels seized thousands of hostages in Dagestan and Yeltsin's response to this was viewed as a failure. Additionally, Yeltsin presided over an economy that was still contracting, and many workers had continued to be unpaid for months. During 1992 and 1993 Russia experienced hyperinflation that wiped out the savings of most people, and its currency collapsed in 1994.

By early 1996, Yeltsin's public approval was so poor that he was polling at fifth place among presidential candidates, with only 8 percent support, while CPRF leader Gennady Zyuganov was in the lead with 21 percent support. When Zyuganov showed up at the World Economic Forum in Davos, Switzerland, in February 1996, many Western leaders and the international media were eager to see him, and treated him with regards to believing that he would likely be the next president of Russia.

== Candidates ==
=== Registered candidates ===
| Candidate name, age, political party | Political offices | Campaign | Registration date |
|---|---|---|---|
| Vladimir Bryntsalov (49); Russian Socialist Party | Deputy of the State Duma (1995–2003) | campaign | 26 April 1996 |
| Mikhail Gorbachev (65); Independent | De facto leader of the Soviet Union; General Secretary of the Communist Party of the Soviet Union (1985–1991); President of the Soviet Union (1990–1991); Chairman of the Supreme Soviet (1989–1990); Chairman of the Presidium of the Supreme Soviet (1988–1989) | campaign | 12 April 1996 |
| Svyatoslav Fyodorov (69); Party of Workers' Self-Government | People's Deputy of the Soviet Union (1989–1991); Deputy of the State Duma (1995–1999) | campaign | 19 April 1996 |
| Alexander Lebed (46); Congress of Russian Communities | Deputy of the State Duma (1995–1996) | campaign | 19 April 1996 |
| Martin Shakkum (44); Socialist People's Party of Russia | Leader of the Socialist People's Party | campaign | 22 April 1996 |
| Yury Vlasov (60); Independent | People's Deputy of the Soviet Union (1989–1991); Deputy of the State Duma (1993–1995) | campaign | 26 April 1996 |
| Grigory Yavlinsky (44); Yabloko | Chairman of Yabloko (1993–2008); Deputy of the State Duma (1993–2003) | campaign | 19 April 1996 |
| Boris Yeltsin (65); Independent | President of Russia (1991–1999) | campaign | 3 April 1996 |
| Vladimir Zhirinovsky (50); Liberal Democratic Party | Leader of the Liberal Democratic Party of Russia (1991–2022); Deputy of the State Duma (1993–2022) | campaign | 5 April 1996 |
| Gennady Zyuganov (52); Communist Party | First Secretary of the Central Committee of the Communist Party of the Russian Federation (1993–present); Deputy of the State Duma (1993–present) | campaign | 4 March 1996 |

=== Withdrawn candidates ===
| Candidate name, age, political party | Political offices | Campaign | Details | Registration date | Date of withdrawal |
|---|---|---|---|---|---|
| Aman Tuleyev (52); Independent | Chairman of the Kemerovo Oblast Council of People's Deputies | (campaign) | He was registered as a candidate on 26 April 1996 but withdrew his candidacy on 8 June 1996 to support Gennady Zyuganov. Since Tuleyev withdrew his candidacy after the deadline, he was included in the ballots and received 308 votes during the early voting. | 26 April 1996 | 8 June 1996 |

== Campaigning ==
=== Vladimir Bryntsalov ===
Pharmaceutical businessman Vladimir Bryntsalov ran as the candidate of the Russian Socialist Party. Brytsalov argued that his leadership would eliminate the country's poverty, promising that if he were elected, there would be "no poor pensioners, no poor workers, no poor entrepreneurs, no poor farmers." His plan, which he dubbed "Russian socialism", was for large companies to begin paying wages comparable to companies in other industrialized nations. The plan anticipated that the employees of the companies would consequentially pay larger income taxes, spend more on consumer goods, and increase their productivity at their jobs. The feasibility of this plan was criticized, as Russian companies were considered to be unable to pay such wages.

Brytsalov promoted himself with the superlative claim of being "the richest man in Russia" and flaunted his wealth. Despite being at the time a recently elected deputy of the State Duma, Brytsalov did not have a voting-record. In his legislative career, he had very low attendance and extremely little participation. Brytsalov was seen as a marginal candidate, and was generally regarded as unlikely to win the election.

=== Mikhail Gorbachev ===
Former Soviet leader Mikhail Gorbachev ran as an independent candidate. He ran as a self-proclaimed social democrat, and asserted that, of those running for president, his was the voice of responsibility and moderation. His campaign was hampered both by strong public disdain towards him and a strong lack of media coverage for his candidacy. At one point, Gorbachev complained that there was less press freedom than when he was leader of the Soviet Union.

Gorbachev subsequently questioned the validity of the election results. While he acknowledged that he had lost by a significant margin, Gorbachev suspected that his actual vote count still exceeded what was reported in the official tally. In 2017, Gorbachev wrote in his book The New Russia that "there have been no fair and free elections in Russia since those of 1989, 1990 and the election of 1991 when Boris Yeltsin became the first president of Russia."

=== Svyatoslav Fyodorov ===
Svyatoslav Fyodorov, a politician and renown ophthalmologist, ran as the candidate of the Party of Workers' Self-Government. He was the founder and leader of the party, which at the time was arguably the most influential social-democratic movement in Russia. Fyodorov was considered to be on the center-left of the political spectrum. In 1994, Fyodorov had described his political objective by stating: "I want peasants to own farms, workers to own factories, physicians to own clinics, and everyone to pay a 30% tax, and the rest is theirs."

Fyodorov advocated for the mass creation of joint stock companies to guarantee workers a share of profits and allow them to actively participate in management of their companies. He dubbed this concept "democratic capitalism" or "popular socialism". He had advocated such a policy since as early as 1991. Fyodorov advocated for economic freedom, simple and moderate taxation, stimulation of production, and a ban on exports of most raw materials. Fyodorov promised that his policies would double the nation's GDP within five years. Fyodorov proclaimed to draw inspiration in his politics from both Ross Perot and Deng Xiaoping. Up until early May 1996, Fyodorov unsuccessfully attempted to negotiate the creation of a third force coalition, with negotiations largely centering on a coalition between him and fellow candidates Yavlinsky and Lebed.

=== Alexander Lebed ===
General Alexander Lebed ran as the nominee of the Congress of Russian Communities, a centrist nationalist party. Lebed promoted himself as an authoritative leader that would introduce law and order, tackle corruption, and allow capitalism to blossom. While he presented an authoritarian personality, he held moderate positions. After reaching an informal agreement with Yeltsin in April (under which Lebed promised to endorse Yeltsin in the second round of the election), Lebed began to see positive news coverage, as well as a greater overall quantity of media coverage. This was done as part of an effort by Yeltsin's camp to promote Lebed in the hopes that he would syphon off votes from other nationalist candidates in the first-round. Up until early May 1996, Lebed had entertained negotiations with Yavlinsky and Fyodorov to jointly form a third force coalition.

=== Martin Shakkum ===
Martin Shakkum ran as an independent candidate. An associate of radical economist Stanislav Shatalin, Shakkum was on the right wing of the Russian political spectrum. Like Lebed, although he presented himself with an authoritarian personality, he held moderate positions on many social issues.

=== Aman Tuleyev ===
Independent candidate Aman Tuleyev, a member of the Communist Party of the Russian Federation (CPRF), styled himself as a "Muslim Communist". The head of the Kemerovo Oblast legislature, Tuleyev was considered to be charismatic, energetic, and well-liked by the CPRF's political base. Despite the fact that Tuleyev dropped out of the race before the election, he had already been on the ballot during a portion of the early voting period, and he turned-in his signatures the day before the deadline. He was considered to be a fallback CPRF candidate in case Zyuganov's candidacy faltered. Tuleyev's rhetoric straddled between hardline communism and social democracy. Generally a hardliner, he had nonetheless occasionally taken moderate stances, such as seeking tax cuts. Tuleyev's positions centered upon communism and creating a disciplined and uncorrupt government. Tuleyev dropped out of the race on 8 June 1996 and endorsed Zyuganov.

=== Yury Vlasov ===
Politician and former Olympic weightlifter Yury Vlasov ran as an independent candidate. His politics were characterized as nationalist. Vlasov openly espoused antisemitic rhetoric. Vlasov dubbed his politics as "people's patriotism". His campaign platform proclaimed: "There is only one single force that is able to unite almost all and at the same time become the ideological basis of the Russian state – popular patriotism." While he had been a supporter of democratic reforms in the Soviet Union, Vlasov had embraced authoritarian political views following its collapse. Vlasov likened his politics to Gaullism. He argued that his politics were a more effective unifying force than communist or liberal-democratic ideals. Although he was nominally an independent candidate, Vlasov's campaign was supported by the People's National Party; by the end of the election, many in the party grew dissatisfied with Vlasov's campaign style, believing he failed to campaign aggressively enough. Despite polling at under one percent, Vlasov had stated that he anticipated capturing between six and seven percent of the vote. He swore to refuse supporting either Yeltsin or support Zyuganov in the runoff.

=== Grigory Yavlinsky ===
Grigory Yavlinsky ran as the nominee of Yabloko. Yavlinsky officially accepted Yabloko's nomination on 27 January 1996. In terms of social issues, Yavlinsky occupied the political left. In terms of economic issues, Yavlinsky occupied the far right of the Russian political spectrum. His ideology most strongly appealed to Russia's population of young intellectuals. Yabloko had been a programmatic party, as opposed to a populist one. This proved to be a weakness for Yavlinsky's campaign, as he and his party opted to maintain their long-established party positions on many issues rather than reshaping their agenda in order to better capitalize on the political tides. This had also been the case in the preceding 1995 electoral campaign, during which Yabloko similarly had opted to focus on complex economic issues, rather than focusing on bread and butter issues. Up until early May 1996, Yavlinsky unsuccessfully attempted to negotiate the creation of a third force coalition, with negotiations largely centering on a coalition between him and fellow candidates Lebed and Fyodorov.

=== Boris Yeltsin ===
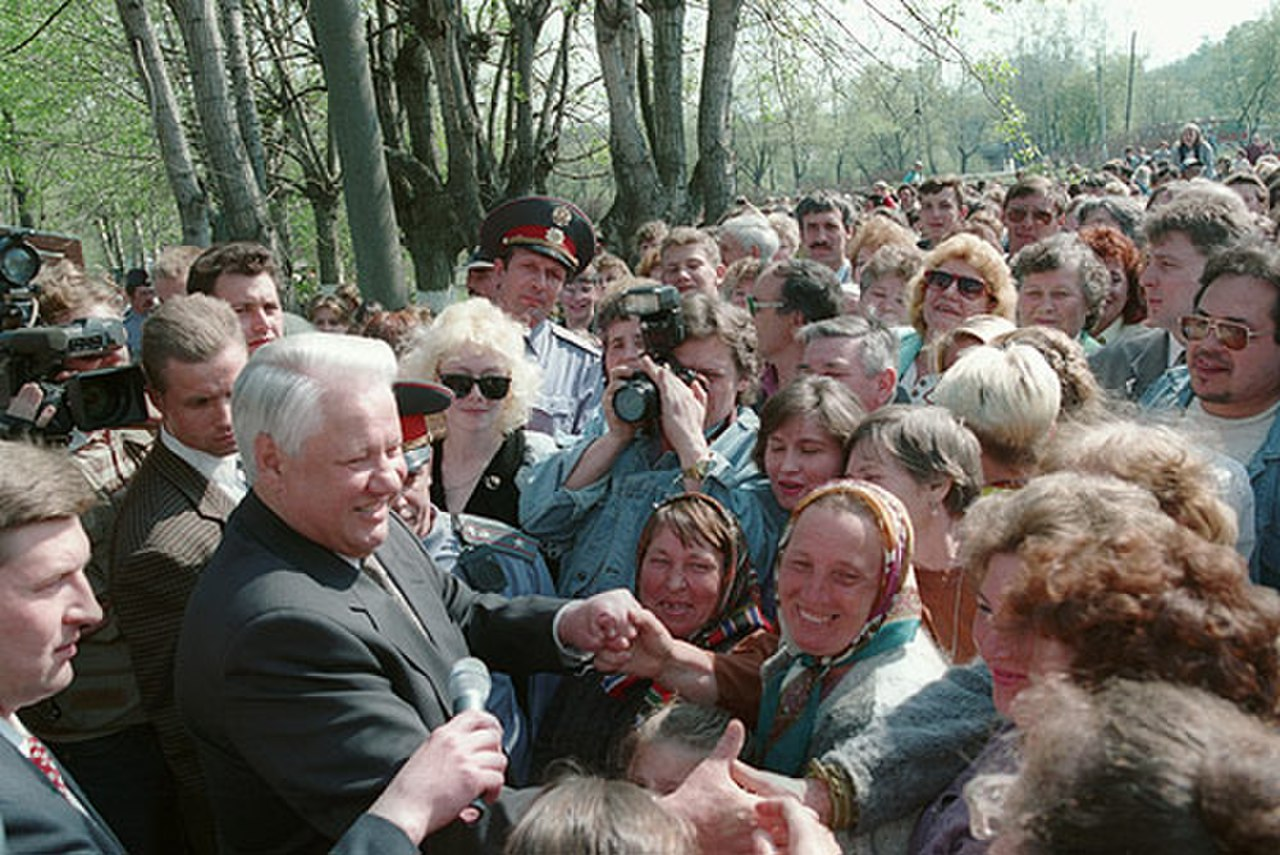
Yeltsin campaigning in Moscow Oblast on 7 May 1996

Incumbent Boris Yeltsin ran for re-election as an independent candidate. While his prospects of winning were originally faltering, Yeltsin was able to resuscitate his image and pull off a successful campaign. Yeltsin's original strategy, devised by Oleg Soskovets, involved him pivoting towards the nationalist wing of Russia's politics in order to directly compete for votes with Zyuganov and Zhirinovsky; this strategy was ultimately abandoned in favor of one devised by reformists and British and American consultants. Yeltsin's new campaign strategy was, essentially, to convince voters that they had to choose him as the lesser of two evils. This strategy sought to recast Yeltsin as an individual single-handedly fighting to stave off Communist control. The campaign framed a narrative that portrayed Yeltsin as Russia's best hope for stability. The campaign worked to shift the narrative of the election into a referendum on whether voters wanted to return to their Communist past (with Zyuganov), or continue with reforms (with Yeltsin).

Yeltsin was able to leverage the power of his office. This included using government funds to finance campaign promises, utilizing state media organizations, and currying favoritism amongst financial and media oligarchs. Two days after the conclusion of the first round, Yeltsin appointed former general Alexander Lebed, who had finished third with 14.7% of vote, to the post of Secretary of Security Council of the Russian Federation and the President's National Security Advisor. Lebed in turn endorsed Yeltsin in the runoff election. Meanwhile, Yeltsin suffered from a serious heart attack and disappeared from public view. His condition was kept secret through the second-round election on 3 July 1996. During this period of time, Yeltsin's campaign team created a "virtual Yeltsin" shown in the media through staged interviews that never happened and pre-recorded radio addresses.

=== Vladimir Zhirinovsky ===
The Liberal Democratic Party of Russia (LDPR) leader Vladimir Zhirinovsky campaigned on nationalist rhetoric. After his surprisingly strong third-place finish in the 1991 presidential election and the surprisingly strong first-place performance of the LDPR in the 1993 Russian legislative election, Zhirinivsky had once been seen as a rising force in Russian politics and a future contender for the presidency. Boorish and outlandish conduct by Zhirinovsky had diminished the public perception of his stature to such a degree that, by 1996, he was seen as a buffoonish figure and was no longer seen as a viable candidate.

=== Gennady Zyuganov ===
The Communist Party of the Russian Federation (CPRF) leader Gennady Zyuganov successfully advanced to the second-round of the election, where he was defeated by Yeltsin. Coming off of a very successful CPRF performance in the 1995 Russian legislative election, when he launched his campaign, Zyuganov had originally been seen as the frontrunner to win the election.

== Conduct ==
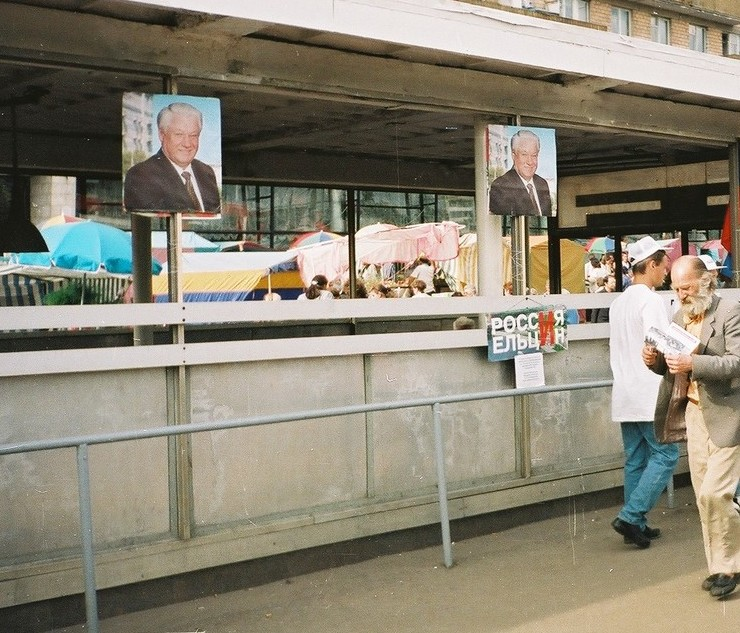
Yeltsin campaign advertisements on the Preobrazhenskaya Ploshchad subway station in June 1996

=== Contemporary analysis ===
In their 1996 report, the International Republican Institute stated that their election observers "witnessed no deliberate attempts to commit electoral fraud and, indeed, in the tracking of protocols through the various levels of Russia's electoral system, observed transparency in the process." In their 1996 analysis, the Belfer Center for Science and International Affairs declared that, while the election failed to be "free and fair" in regards to media coverage and campaign financing, it appeared to have largely succeeded in being "free and fair" in regards to the administration of voting and vote-counting.

Observers from the Organization for Security and Co-operation in Europe (OSCE) reported in 1996 that the first round of the election "appeared to be generally well run, and not seriously marred by some problems which occurred in the pre-election campaign. The delegation considered the first round of the Russian Presidential elections to have been conducted in a generally free and fair manner." The OSCE also reported: "Delegation members considered voter participation in the political campaign to be quite active compared to previous Russian elections. A relatively open flow of information concerning candidates and their platforms was made available to voters during the pre-election campaign; opposition candidates charged that the state controlled electronic broadcast media did not provide fair and balanced coverage, and this was also observed to be the case by delegation members. The bias appeared to be primarily in favor of the President." The OSCE concluded: "The delegation found that Polling Station Election Committees (PSECs) generally followed proper procedures and enforced the one-man-one-vote principle, although scattered instances of minor irregularities, such as family voting and voting outside of polling booths were observed."

In a 1996 post-election analysis published in the journal Presidential Studies Quarterly, Erik Depov asserted: "The inaccuracy of many early predictions was primarily because Yeltsin's successful re-election bid had as much to do with the dynamics of the electoral campaign as with the results of his first term in office. If the 1996 presidential campaign proved anything, it illustrated the danger of underestimating Yeltsin's ability to meet a serious political challenge head on and prevail despite apparently insurmountable odds." During the campaign, Yeltsin's opponents criticized his use of state coffers to fund programs that would bolster his approval with voters. Yeltsin had been utilizing state finances to fund programs (such as pensions) with the aim of convincing voters of his willingness to fulfill promises he was making on the campaign trail. Yeltsin's opponents charged that, in doing this, he was essentially buying votes; in turn, Yeltsin's team argued that he was simply doing his job as president. During the second round campaign, Zyuganov asserted in a letter to the parliament, the Central Election Commission, and the media that Yeltsin was buying votes with money that should be used to pay wage and pension arrears and that he had pressured local leaders into working for his campaign. He also alleged that Yeltsin was using "tens of trillions of rubles" from the state budget for campaign purposes. Zyuganov argued that such practices would call into question the results of the voting and urged immediate measures that would insure equal conditions for the candidates.

=== Pro-Yeltsin media bias ===
Yeltsin benefited from an immense media bias favoring his campaign. In 1991, at the time of the previous presidential election, Russia had only two major television channels. RTR had supported Yeltsin, while the Programme One (the predecessor of ORT, and later, the present-day Channel One) had criticized him and provided broad coverage of the views of his opponents. Additionally, Programme One was still the main channel of the Soviet Central Television. In the 1996 presidential election, none of Russia's major television networks were critical of Yeltsin. Yeltsin had successfully enlisted the national television channels (ORT, RTR, and NTV) and most of the written press to essentially act as agents of his campaign.

The European Institute for Media found that Yeltsin received 53% of all media coverage of the campaign, while Zyuganov received only 18%. In their evaluation of the biases of news stories, EIM awarded each candidate 1 point for every positive story they received and subtracted a point for every negative story they received. In the first round of the election, Yeltsin scored +492 and Zyuganov scored −313. In the second round of the election, Yeltsin scored +247 and Zyuganov scored −240. Television networks marginalized all of Yeltsin's opponents aside from Zyuganov, helping to create the perception that there were only two viable candidates. This allowed Yeltsin to pose as the lesser-evil. Near the end of the election's first-round, the networks began also providing coverage to the candidacy of Lebed, who had already agreed to support Yeltsin in the second round.

Supplementing the work of the numerous public relations and media firms that were hired by the Yeltsin campaign, a number of media outlets "volunteered" their services to Yeltsin's re-election effort. For instance, Kommersant (one of the most prominent business newspapers in the country) published an anti-Communist paper called Ne Dai Bog (meaning "God forbid"). At ORT, a special committee was placed in charge of planning a marathon of anti-Communist films and documentaries to be broadcast on the channel ahead of the election. Led by the efforts of Mikhail Lesin, the media painted a picture of a fateful choice for Russia, between Yeltsin and a "return to totalitarianism". They even played up the threat of civil war if a Communist was elected president.

One of the reasons for the media's overwhelming favoritism of Yeltsin was their fear that a Communist government would dismantle Russia's right to a free press. Another factor contributing to the media's support of Yeltsin was that his government still owned two of the national television channels, and still provided the majority of funding to the majority of independent newspapers. In addition, Yeltsin's government also was in charge of supplying licenses to media outlets. Yeltsin's government and Yury Luzhkov, the then mayor of Moscow, flexed their power and reminded the owners, publishers, and editors that newspaper licenses and Moscow leases for facilities were "under review". There were also instances of direct payments made for positive coverage ("dollar journalism").

Yeltsin had managed to enlist Russia's emerging business elite to work in his campaign, including those who ran media corporations. This included Vladimir Gusinsky, owner of Most Bank, Independent Television and NTV. NTV which had, prior to the campaign, been critical towards Yeltsin's actions in Chechnya, changed the tone of their coverage. Igor Malashenko, Gusinsky's appointed head of NTV, even joined the Yeltsin campaign and led its media relations in a rather visible conflict of interest. In early 1996, Gusinsky and his political rival Boris Berezovsky (chairman of the Board of ORT) decided that they would put aside their differences in order to work together to support the re-election of Yeltsin. By mid-1996, Yeltsin had recruited a team of a handful of financial and media oligarchs to bankroll the Yeltsin campaign and guarantee favorable media coverage the president on national television and in leading newspapers. In return, Yeltsin's presidential administration allowed well-connected Russian business leaders to acquire majority stakes in some of Russia's most valuable state-owned assets.

To further guarantee consistent media coverage, Yeltsin had fired the chairperson of the All-Russia State Television and Radio Broadcasting Company and replaced him with Eduard Sagalaev in February 1996. While the anti-Communist pro-Yeltsin media bias certainly contributed to Yeltsin's victory, it was not the sole factor. A similar anti-Communist media bias in the run-up to the 1995 parliamentary elections had failed to prevent a Communist victory. Additionally, Yeltsin himself had been able to win the 1991 presidential election in spite of a strongly unfavorable media bias towards him.

=== Violations of campaign laws ===
Following the election, a financial fraud investigation (the Xerox affair) was launched against Yeltsin's campaign. Yeltsin's campaign disregarded numerous campaign regulations. Analysis has indicated that Yeltsin's campaign spent well in excess of spending limits. Yeltsin also violated a law against broadcasting advertisements before 15 March. Yeltsin undertook many abuses of his power in order to assist his campaign effort.

=== Fraud ===
Some instances of fraud were indicated to have taken place; the various political actors, including the opposition, did not challenge the result. The Central Election Commission (CEC) found in 1996 that the original second-round results reported from Mordovia were falsified. A significant number of votes that had been cast for Zyuganov were recorded as "Against All Candidates". The vote totals from Mordovia were subsequently adjusted by the CEC in order to remedy this. The CEC also discovered fraud in Dagestan, an ethnic republic which had experienced a very improbable change in voting patterns between rounds, and the vote totals were revised to remedy this. Another instance of fraud was discovered in Karachay-Cherkessia by the CEC. The vote totals were adjusted to remedy for this as well.

==== Allegations of unfairness and fraud ====
There have been a number of allegations claiming further and greater instances of fraud than the instances that had been discovered by the CEC. They include a number of allegations that assert that the election was unfair and favored Yeltsin, as well as some allegations that go as far as to assert that the entire election was fraudulent. In addition to federal subjects in which fraud was discovered by the CEC, some results, such as those from Russia's ethnic republics of Tatarstan and Bashkortostan, showed highly-unlikely changes in voting patterns between the two rounds of voting. That has aroused suspicions of election fraud, although any fraud that may have contributed to those discrepancies is unlikely to have had a material effect on the outcome of the election. One hypothesis that has been given for the dramatic increase in support that Yeltsin saw in some regions was that prior to the second round vote, administrative pressure was applied in those regions to coerce voters into supporting Yeltsin.

Allegations have been made by some that in the first round of the election, several regions of Russia committed electoral fraud in favor of Zyuganov. It has also been further alleged by some that several of the republics switched the direction of their fraud during the second round to favor Yeltsin instead. Mikhail Gorbachev voiced a belief that the results of the election were falsified. He stated that he believes that the results underreported his actual share of the vote. At a meeting with opposition leaders in 2012, the then Russian president Dmitry Medvedev was reported to have said: "There is hardly any doubt who won [that race]. It was not Boris Nikolaevich Yeltsin."

=== American influence ===
After the election, a group of American consultants that worked for the Yeltsin campaign sought to take credit for Yeltsin's successful re-election in a profile published in the July 1996 issue of Time magazine with the headline "Yanks to the Rescue". Their account was later the basis of the 2003 comedy Spinning Boris. There was separate reporting that indicated that their work for Yeltsin's campaign did not play a consequential role in shaping the campaign, with Time receiving accusations of poor journalism and sensationalism for publishing the consultants' claims about their importance to the campaign without practicing skepticism. Additionally, it had not at all been unusual for foreign consultants to work on campaigns in the nation's fledgling electoral politics.

Knowing that his voter base was pro-Western, Yeltsin lobbied the then United States president Bill Clinton to speak in praising terms of Russia's transition to democracy. Yeltsin believed that this would strengthen his support from voters. Yeltsin warned Clinton of the possible ramifications of a Zyuganov victory, saying: "There is a U.S. press campaign suggesting that people should not be afraid of the communists; that they are good, honorable and kind people. I warn people not to believe this. More than half of them are fanatics; they would destroy everything. It would mean civil war. They would abolish the boundaries between the republics. They want to take back Crimea; they even make claims against Alaska. ... There are two paths for Russia's development. I do not need power. But when I felt the threat of communism, I decided that I had to run. We will prevent it." In their conversations, Clinton assured Yeltsin that he would give him his publicly declared personal endorsement, saying: "I've been trying to find a way to say to the Russian people 'this election will have consequences,' and we are clear about what it is we support." Yeltsin made other requests, such as admission into the G8 (not granted), a $2.5 billion direct cash loan to the government (not granted), and a delay in NATO expansion (granted). Clinton refrained from undertaking covert operations to support Yeltsin in order to prevent spurring backlash if such efforts were to be discovered.

In 1995, Clinton urged Yeltsin to sign Russia's participation plan in the NATO Partnership for Peace program and to send a peacekeeper detachment for the NATO mission in Bosnia-Herzegovina. He also asked Yeltsin to end his opposition to the first stage of NATO expansion into Eastern Europe, and in return Clinton offered to support his re-election campaign. Among other things, this included not taking any visible steps towards expanding NATO until after the election. Yeltsin agreed, and authorized his foreign minister Andrei Kozyrev to sign the Partnership for Peace participation plan.

In January 1997, observing the support Yeltsin had received in 1996 from the Clinton administration, former candidate Alexander Lebed visited the United States to rally support from American businesses for a potential run in the 2000 Russian presidential election. As one analyst wrote at the time, "[Lebed] may perceive that Yeltsin benefited greatly from support from the Americans in the last campaign. Clinton made a trip to Moscow during the campaign. And the International Monetary Fund extended loans that enabled the Government to make credible promises to pay wages." Some argued that the role of the Clinton administration in securing an International Monetary Fund loan for Russia had an impact on the election, with some critics characterizing it as an act of foreign electoral intervention.

== Results ==
| Candidate | Party | First round | | Second round | |
| Candidate | Party | Votes | % | Votes | % |
|---|---|---|---|---|---|
| Boris Yeltsin | Independent | 26,665,495 | 35.79 | 40,203,948 | 54.40 |
| Gennady Zyuganov | Communist Party | 24,211,686 | 32.49 | 30,102,288 | 40.73 |
| Alexander Lebed | Congress of Russian Communities | 10,974,736 | 14.73 | | |
| Grigory Yavlinsky | Yabloko | 5,550,752 | 7.45 | | |
| Vladimir Zhirinovsky | Liberal Democratic Party | 4,311,479 | 5.79 | | |
| Svyatoslav Fyodorov | Party of Workers' Self-Government | 699,158 | 0.94 | | |
| Mikhail Gorbachev | Independent | 386,069 | 0.52 | | |
| Martin Shakkum | Socialist People's Party | 277,068 | 0.37 | | |
| Yury Vlasov | Independent | 151,282 | 0.20 | | |
| Vladimir Bryntsalov | Russian Socialist Party | 123,065 | 0.17 | | |
| Aman Tuleyev (Note: Withdrew his candidacy before the election but received 308 votes during the early voting (up to the withdrawal of the candidature), which were credited as valid.) | Independent | 308 | 0.00 | | |
| Against all | | 1,163,921 | 1.56 | 3,604,462 | 4.88 |
| Total | | 74,515,019 | 100.00 | 73,910,698 | 100.00 |
| Valid votes | | 74,515,019 | 98.58 | 73,910,698 | 98.95 |
| Invalid/blank votes | | 1,072,120 | 1.42 | 780,592 | 1.05 |
| Total votes | | 75,587,139 | 100.00 | 74,691,290 | 100.00 |
| Registered voters/turnout | | 108,495,023 | 69.67 | 108,589,050 | 68.78 |
Source: Nohlen & Stöver, Colton, CEC

== See also ==
- Red Belt (Russia), term describing federal subjects that had strong support for Zyuganov's Communist Party of the Russian Federation
- Third force (1996 Russian presidential election), a proposed electoral bloc
