= Cuba–Soviet Union relations =

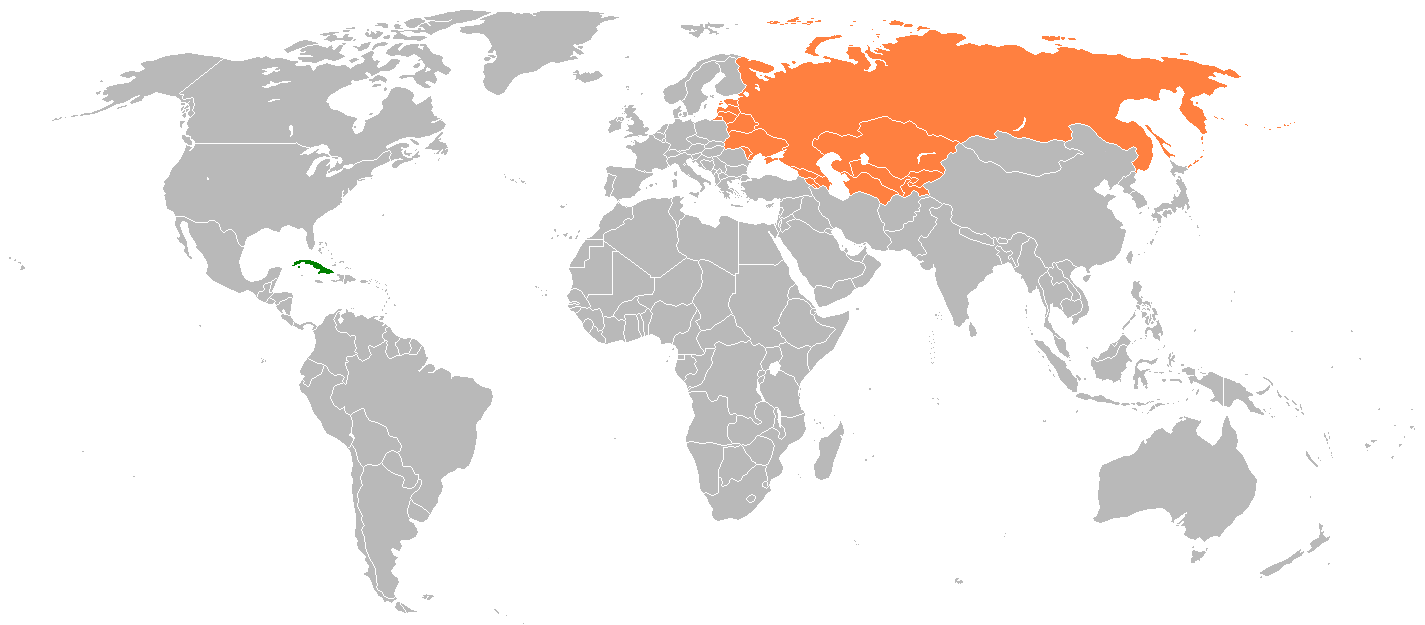

- Cuba: Soviet Union

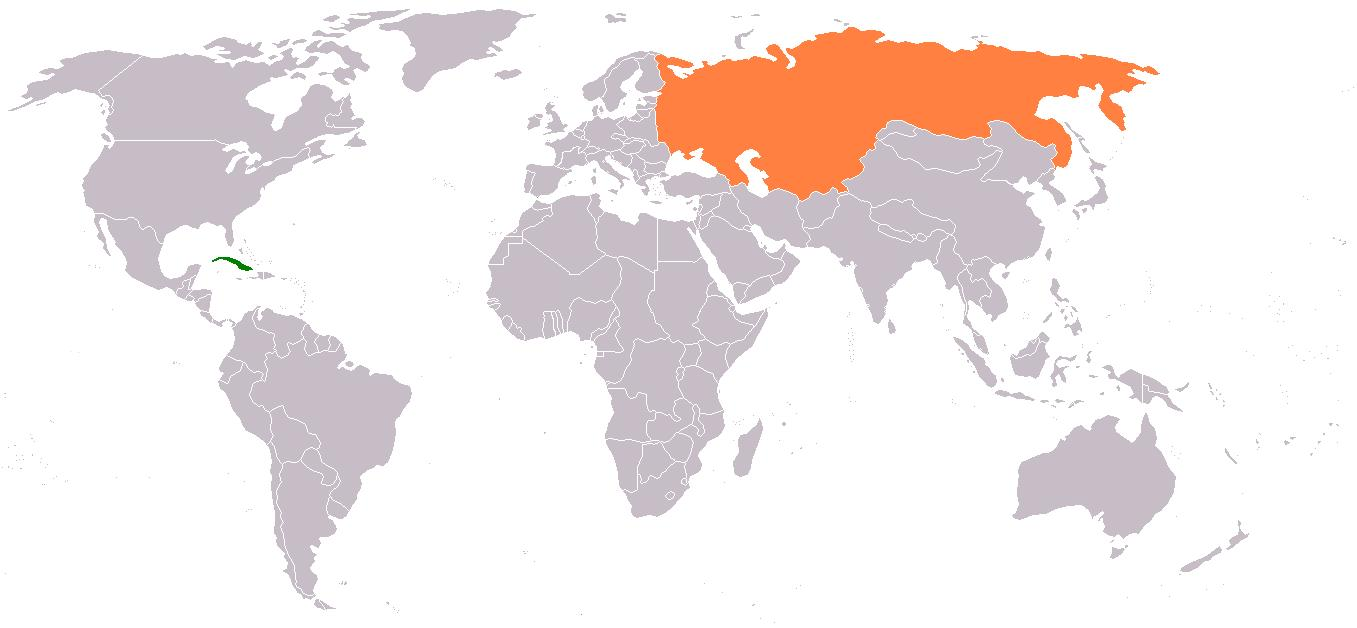
Map indicating locations of Cuba and Soviet Union in the 1930s. Cuba in green, Soviet Union in orange

After the establishment of diplomatic ties with the Soviet Union after the Cuban Revolution of 1959, Cuba became increasingly dependent on Soviet markets and military aid and was an ally of the Soviet Union during the Cold War. In 1972 Cuba joined the Council for Mutual Economic Assistance (Comecon), an economic organization of states designed to create co-operation among the communist planned economies, which was dominated by its largest economy, the Soviet Union. Moscow kept in regular contact with Havana and shared varying close relations until the end of the Soviet Union in 1991. Cuba then entered an era of serious economic hardship, the Special Period.

The relationship between the USSR and the Castro regime were initially warm. The relationship cooled in the aftermath of the Cuban missile crisis to 1968. After 1968, the USSR provided substantial direct economic aid to Cuba. At times, the relationship was contentious, as the Soviet leadership criticized Castro's mismanagement of the Cuban economy and complained about the burden of providing direct aid to Cuba.

== History ==
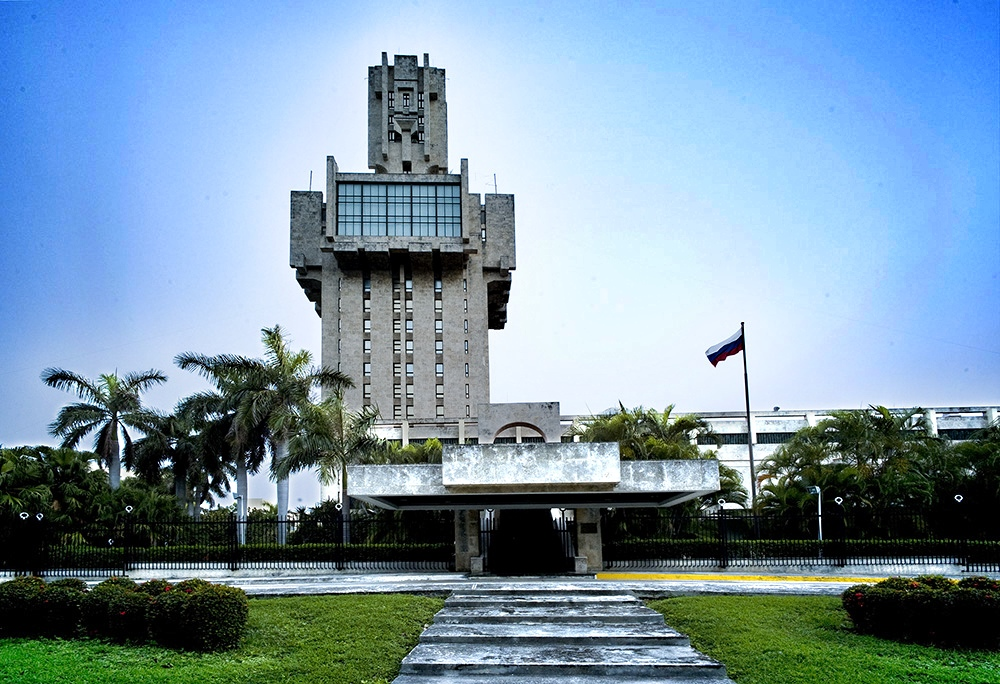
Soviet (now Russian) embassy in Miramar, Havana

=== Relations before Cuban Revolution ===
The first diplomatic relations between the Soviet Union and Cuba developed during World War II. Maxim Litvinov, the Soviet ambassador to the United States, set up the first Soviet embassy in Havana in 1943, and Cuban diplomats under the auspices of President Fulgencio Batista visited Moscow the same year. The Soviets then made a number of contacts with the communist Popular Socialist Party, who had a foothold in Batista's governing Democratic Socialist Coalition. Litvinov's successor, Andrei Gromyko, became the ambassador to both the US and Cuba but never visited the latter during his tenure.

After the war, the governments of Ramón Grau and Carlos Prío Socarrás sought to isolate the Cuban Communist Party, and relations with the Soviet Union were abandoned. Batista's return to power in a 1952 coup saw the closure of the embassy.

=== After the revolution ===
The Cuban Revolution propelled Fidel Castro to power on January 1, 1959, but initially attracted little attention in Moscow. Soviet planners, resigned to US dominance over the Western Hemisphere, were unprepared for the possibility of a future ally in the region. According to later testimonies from Soviet Premier Nikita Khrushchev, neither the Soviet Communist Party's Central Committee nor KGB intelligence had any idea who Castro was or what he was fighting for. Khrushchev advised them to consult Cuban communists, who reported that Castro was a representative of the "haute bourgeoisie" and working for the Central Intelligence Agency.

In February 1960, Khrushchev sent his deputy, Anastas Mikoyan, to Cuba to discover what motivated Castro, who had returned from failed trip to Washington, DC, where he was refused a meeting with US President Dwight Eisenhower. According to reports, Khrushchev's aides had initially tried to characterize Castro as an untrustworthy American agent.

Mikoyan returned from Cuba with the opinion that Castro's new administration should be helped economically and politically, but there was still talk of military assistance.

Washington's increasing economic embargo led Cuba to seek new markets in a hurry to avert economic disaster. Cuba and the Soviet Union signed their first trade deal in 1960, in which Cuba traded sugar to the Soviet Union in exchange for fuel. The deal was to play a part in sustaining the Cuban economy for many years to come. It also would play a role in the Soviet economy, with Cuban sugar becoming widely available even during frequent shortages of other food products.

Beginning in 1960 and running through 1990, the Soviet Union provided Cuba with all of its oil needs on credit (which was not paid back) and at subsidized prices.

After the failed Bay of Pigs Invasion of 1961, Castro announced publicly that Cuba was to become a socialist republic. Khrushchev sent congratulations to Castro for repelling the invasion but privately believed that the Americans would soon bring the weight of their regular army to bear. The defense of Cuba became a matter of prestige for the Soviet Union, and Khrushchev believed that the Americans would block all access to the island by sea or by air.

=== Cuban Missile Crisis ===
Khrushchev agreed on a deployment plan in May 1962, primarily in response to Castro's fears over yet another American invasion, and by late July, after signing the Soviet-Cuban Friendship, Cooperation and Mutual Defence Treaty, over 60 Soviet ships had been en route to Cuba, some of which were carrying military material. Khrushchev and Castro planned to secretly establish a Soviet Armed Forces presence on the island before announcing a defense pact once nuclear-armed ballistic missiles were installed and targeted at the United States. A U-2 flight on the morning of October 14 photographed a series of surface-to-air missile sites being constructed. In a televised address on October 22, US President John F. Kennedy announced the discovery of the installations and proclaimed that any nuclear missile attack from Cuba would be regarded as an attack by the Soviet Union and would be responded to accordingly.

The Cuban Missile Crisis became the peak of Soviet-Cuban diplomatic friendship and military cooperation. The Castro brothers and Che Guevara became popular figures among the Soviet public, who believed they were reminiscent of the leaders of the Russian Revolution. However, Castro unnerved the Soviet Politburo with his belligerent attitude towards the crisis, urging the Soviet Union to launch a preemptive nuclear strike to annihilate the United States.

Khrushchev sent letters to Kennedy on October 23 and 24 that claimed the deterrent nature of the missiles in Cuba and the peaceful intentions of the Soviet Union. On October 26, the Soviets offered to withdraw the missiles in return for US guarantees to avoid carrying out or supporting an of invasion of Cuba and to remove all of the missiles in southern Italy and in Turkey. The deal was accepted, and the crisis abated.

The Cuban Missile Crisis had a significant impact on the countries involved. It led to a thaw in American-Soviet relations but strained Cuban-Soviet relations. Castro was not consulted throughout the Kennedy-Khrushchev negotiations and was angered by the unilateral Soviet withdrawal of the missiles and bombers. Also, the People's Republic of China publicly criticized the outcome.

=== Lourdes SIGINT Station ===
In 1962, the Soviets created a SIGINT facility in Lourdes, just south of Havana. The SIGINT facility at Lourdes was among the most significant intelligence collection capabilities targeting the United States. It allowed the Soviets to monitor all US military and civilian geosynchronous communications satellites.

The station was abandoned in 2002.

=== Castro's trip to Moscow ===
After the crisis, in June 1963 Castro made a historic visit to the Soviet Union, returning from Cuba to recall the construction projects he had seen, specifically the Siberian hydro power stations. Castro also spoke about the development of Soviet agriculture and repeatedly emphasized the necessity for using Soviet experience in solving internal tasks of socialist construction in Cuba. Castro asserted that the Soviet people "expressed by their deeds their love for and solidarity with Cuba."

On the trip, Castro and Khrushchev negotiated new sugar export deals and agricultural methods to solve the main problem in increasing the output of sugar.

Despite Soviet attempts to appease Castro, Cuban-Soviet relations were still marred by a number of difficulties. Castro increased contacts with China, exploited the growing Sino-Soviet split and proclaimed his intention to remain neutral and to maintain fraternal relations with all socialist states. The Sino-Soviet split also impacted on Castro's relationship with Che Guevara, who took a more Maoist view after ideological conflict between the Soviet Communist Party and the Chinese Communist Party. In 1966, Guevara left for Bolivia in an ill-fated attempt to stir up revolution against René Barrientos' U.S.-sponsored military junta

=== Soviet invasion of Czechoslovakia ===
On 23 August 1968, Castro made a public gesture to the Soviet Union that reaffirmed his support. Two days after the Warsaw Pact invasion of Czechoslovakia to repress the Prague Spring, Castro took to the airwaves and publicly denounced the Czechoslovak "rebellion." Castro warned the Cuban people about the Czechoslovak "counterrevolutionaries," who "were moving Czechoslovakia towards capitalism and into the arms of imperialists." He called the leaders of the rebellion "the agents of West Germany and fascist reactionary rabble." In return for his public backing of the invasion while many Soviet allies deemed the invasion to be an infringement of Czechoslovak sovereignty, the Soviets bailed out the Cuban economy with extra loans and an immediate increase in oil exports.

=== Brezhnev era ===
With Cuba's proximity to the United States, Castro and his regime became an important Cold War ally for the Soviets. The relationship was for the most part economic, with the Soviet Union providing military, economic, and political assistance to Cuba. In 1972, Cuba gained membership into Comecon, which enhanced strong co-operation in the realm of national economic planning and increasingly gave Moscow economic control over Cuba. Comecon deemed Cuba one of its underdeveloped member countries and therefore Cuba could obtain oil in direct exchange for sugar at a rate that was highly favorable to Cuba. Hard currency Cuba obtained from re-exporting oil facilitated Cuba's importation of goods from non-Comecon countries and facilitated its investments in social services.

From 1976 to 1980, the Soviets invested US$1.7 billion on the construction and remodeling of Cuban factories and industry. Between 1981 and 1984 Cuba also received approximately US$750 million a year in Soviet military assistance.

Between 28 January and 3 February 1974, Soviet Premier Leonid Brezhnev undertook a state visit to Cuba and was the first Soviet leader to visit Cuba or any other country in Latin America. Foreign Affairs Minister Andrey Gromyko, Chairman of the State Committee of the Council of Ministers on Foreign Relations Ivan Arkhipov, and General Director of TASS Leonid Zamyatin were part of the Soviet delegation. Brezhnev arrived at José Martí International Airport and was met with a reception with full military honors from the Ceremonial Unit of the Cuban Revolutionary Armed Forces. On 29 January, the Soviet delegation visited Plaza de la Revolución and laid a wreath at the José Martí Memorial before it held talks with Castro in the Palace of the Revolution. More than a million Cubans took part in the Cuban-Soviet friendship rally, which was held on Revolution Square, in Havana. The next day, he held more talks with Castro, his brother Raul and President Osvaldo Dorticos, and it was decided that the design and construction of high-voltage power lines in the east and the west of Cuba would be carried out. On 31 January, in the suburbs of Havana, both took part in the opening of the Lenin Secondary Special Boarding School. At the end of the visit, he was awarded the Order of José Martí.

=== Gorbachev era ===
When Mikhail Gorbachev came to power in March 1985, the Soviets continued to consider Cuba as an important Cold War propaganda tool. Economic investment and trade in Cuba were at their highest. In 1985, trade with the Soviets accounted for over 70% of Cuba's entire trade. Both nations continued to collaborate on projects in the sciences, technology, sports, and education. However, throughout the Gorbachev era diplomatic relations cooled until the end of the Soviet Union in 1991 terminated Soviet-Cuban relations.

Heightened tensions best characterized diplomatic relations between Cuba and the Soviet Union throughout the Gorbachev era. The introduction of his Soviet reforms of perestroika and glasnost and his "new thinking" on the foreign policy set off an economic crisis in the Soviet Union, opened up the Soviets and their allies to increasing internal criticism from dissidents, and sparked an ideological conflict with the Cuban regime.

==== 1985–1989 ====
The Soviet Union faced a varying array of problems when Gorbachev took power after the death of General Secretary Konstantin Chernenko in 1985. However, Gorbachev's attempts at reforms not only provoked the strengthening of a vocal opposition frustrated over the pace of reforms but also placed the Soviets at odds with Cuba. The transition during perestroika towards market reforms weakened the Soviet ruble and resulted in a reduction of basic subsidies and widespread shortages of basic goods, a loss of jobs, and decreased productivity. The economic difficulties spread to other areas of Eastern Europe and other Soviet satellites, such as Cuba. In essence, perestroika progressively undermined the Soviet Union's ability to live up to its economic commitments to Cuba.

In 1986, Castro embarked on his own set of reforms, which was called the "rectification of errors" campaign. Castro intended for the reforms to forestall or to eradicate any reformist ideas spreading in Cuba prompted by radical political and economic reforms in the Soviet Union or elsewhere in Eastern Europe. The Cuban policies and perestroika were diametrically opposed and highlighted the unravelling of the Soviet-Cuban relationship.

The effects of glasnost on political criticism and discussion in the Soviet Union further strained the Cuban-Soviet alliance. After Castro bashed glasnost during a joint Soviet-Cuban conference in Havana in 1988, the Soviet elite became more critical of Soviet foreign policy towards Cuba, and critical articles in Soviet newspapers soon emerged. Although Havana could not afford to upset Moscow, its main ally, Castro in February 1989 led a small expulsion of Soviet diplomats at the Soviet embassy and banned the sale of Soviet publications and news outlets, He stated, "We could not hesitate to prevent the circulation of Soviet publications in Cuba."

In his visit to rekindle ties with Cuba in April 1989, Gorbachev attempted to convince Castro to take a more positive attitude towards the Soviet Union. Gorbachev was only the second Soviet leader to visit Latin America, and rather than resolve the increasing tensions between the two nations, the visit was mostly a symbolic gesture since Castro had declared the Soviet-Cuban alliance as void 24 hours before the visit. Despite Soviet Foreign Minister Eduard Shevardnadze declaring the meeting to be a "milestone in Soviet-Cuban relations," relations rapidly declined after Gorbachev's return to Moscow.

==== 1989–1991 ====
By 1990, Moscow had found it increasingly difficult to meet its economic responsibilities to Havana. In 1985, it had paid over eleven times the world price for Cuban sugar, but in 1989, it paid only three times the world price. As the economy continued to decline, members of the Soviet elite grew more critical of the unequal terms of trade. For many, "it seemed contrary to the nature of perestroika to continue to prop up an inefficient Cuban economy while struggling to reform the Soviet economy." That forced the Cuban government to search elsewhere for foreign investment and trade. In what was called a "zero-option approach," the Cuban government in 1990 and 1991 established tariff-free trading agreements to boost imports and exports, gave foreign entities more autonomy and generous tax incentives, and began to diversify the economy by focusing more on the pharmaceutical industry and tourism.

More fundamental change in Soviet-Cuba economic relations came with a new one-year trade agreement (as opposed to the previous five-year trade agreements), which was signed in late 1990. The agreement set sugar at world market prices with the intent to reduce Cuban dependence on the Soviet Union. In June 1991, the Soviets disbanded Comecon, which had been a huge basis for the alliance. That further strained the Cuban economic situation.

In the international sphere, Gorbachev's "new thinking" attempted to remove Marxist ideology from east–west relations. His new foreign policy took on a new orientation that stressed international independence, non-offensive defence, multilateral co-operation, and the use of the political process to solve security issues. At first, Castro took a relatively positive outlook on "new thinking." He commented that "this was the first time since the appearance of these awesome weapons of mass destruction... that such a categorical, resolute and concrete proposal had been made." However, ideological divergences over disarmament, international conflicts in Nicaragua and Angola, and the debt crisis in the developing world quickly created irreconcilable differences between Castro and Gorbachev.

Demonstrative of the cooling of Cold War tensions and "new thinking" was the announcement by Gorbachev on September 11, 1991, that all Soviet troops would be removed from Cuba. That move symbolized Gorbachev's efforts to eliminate Marxism from Soviet foreign policy, which Castro believed undermined Cuba's struggle against US imperialism.

After a Soviet coup attempt in August 1991, Cuban leaders felt that they had less to lose and began openly criticising the Soviet reforms. An editorial in Granma several days after the coup wrote that "in the Soviet Union, politicians favour the process of privatization and the acceleration to the market economy. These positions have resulted in the development of these events."

From 1985 to 1991, Soviet-Cuban relations continued, as Moscow wanted the relationship with Cuba to be reformed, not terminated, and Havana relied on continued Soviet investment and trade. Perestroika and Gorbachev's other reforms quickly eroded the economic and political alliance between the Cubans and the Soviets, as it became increasingly difficult for the Soviets to maintain their trade commitments to Cuba. After 1989, Castro publicly criticized Soviet reformism but hoped Soviet communism to survive perestroika.

=== End of Soviet Union ===
The end of the Soviet Union in December 1991 had an immediate and devastating effect on Cuba. Valuable aid and trading privileges ended for Cuba, with the Soviet Union no longer existing. Cuba soon entered a social and fiscal crisis, known as the Special Period.

Since the 1990s, Cuba has maintained and started relationships with other Latin American neighbors and non-aligned countries, but since it is the only Marxist nation in the Western Hemisphere, Cuba can no longer maintain its political status. After the shift to world market prices under the 1991 trade agreement and the dissolution of Comecon, which once accounted for almost 85% of Cuban trade, trade with the Soviet Union declined by more than 90%. The Soviet Union alone imported 80% of Cuban sugar and 40% of Cuban citrus. Oil imports dropped from 13 million tons in 1989 to about 3 million tons in 1993 with Russia.

The Revolutions of 1989 ended communism in Europe, and the end of the Soviet Union led to great isolation and economic hardship in Cuba.

== List of Soviet ambassadors in Cuba ==
As per the Russian Embassy's site.

- List of ambassadors of Russia to Cuba
- Maxim Litvinov, 1942–1943
- Andrei Gromyko (stationed in Washington, D.C.), 1943–1946
- (no relations), 1946–1960
- Sergei Mikhailovich Kudryavtsev (Кудрявцев, Сергей Михайлович), 1960–1962
- Alexandr Ivanovich Alexeyev (Алексеев, Александр Иванович), 1962–1968
- Alexander Alexeyevich Soldatov (Солдатов, Александр Алексеевич), 1968–1970
- Nikita Pavlovich Tolubeyev (Толубеев, Никита Павлович), 1970–1979
- Vitaly Vorotnikov, 1979–1982
- Konstantin Fedorovich Katushev (Катушев, Константин Фёдорович), 1982–1985
- Alexandr Kapto, 1985–1989
- Yury Vladimirovich Petrov 1989–1991
- Arnold Ivanovich Kalinin (Калинин, Арнольд Иванович), 1991–2000 (after the dissolution of the USSR, continued as Russia's ambassador)

== See also ==
- Foreign relations of Cuba
- Soviet Empire
- Cuba–Russia relations
- Cuba–United States relations
