= Guskov =

Guskov or Huskov (Cyrillic: Гуськов) is a Russian masculine surname originating from gus, meaning goose; its feminine counterpart is Guskova or Huskova. Notable people with the name include:

- Aleksandr Guskov (born 1976), Russian ice hockey defenceman
- Aleksei Guskov (born 1958), Russian actor and producer
- Andrei Guskov (born 1985), Russian football player
- Elena Guskova (born 1949), Russian historian
- Hanna Huskova (born 1992), Belarusian freestyle skier
- Marie Hušková (born 1942), Czech mathematician
- Oleksandr Huskov (born 1994), Ukrainian football player
- Svetlana Guskova (born 1957), Moldovan runner
