= People's Architect of the USSR =

Soviet title of honor (1967–1990)

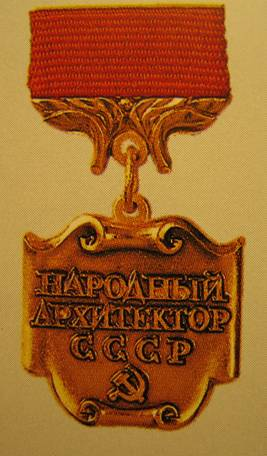
People's Architect of the USSR medal

People's Architect of the USSR (Russian: Народный архитектор СССР), also sometimes translated as National Architect of the USSR, was an honorary title granted to architects of the Soviet Union; it was established on August 12, 1967 by Leonid Brezhnev. It was bestowed by the Presidium of the Supreme Soviet of the USSR owing proposals addressed by the State Construction Committee or by the Soviet Architects' Union. The Supreme Soviet could possibly refuse these designations.

A diploma of the Supreme Soviet's presidency was given to those who were appointed People's Architect of the USSR jointly with the medal and its concerning certificate. The title was bestowed upon architects who had achieved significant results in Soviet architecture's development either applying their expertise and creativity to the urban planning or to the design of important building compounds for civil, industrial or rural use.

Following the Dissolution of the Soviet Union (1991), by a decree of the Russian presidency, it was created the new title of Meritorious Architect of the Russian Federation.

== Design ==
The medal was made of tombac and its shape was quadrangular (22,5 x 23,5 mm) with twisted corners. The central part was occupied by the inscription "Народный архитектор СССР" (People's Architect of the USSR) and, below, the hammer and sickle symbol. Symbol and inscription and were embossed, with convex letters. The medal was suspended to a single red silk fringe (18 mm × 21 mm) to whom it was attached by a metallic buckle decorated with bay laurel leaves.

== Some awardees ==
- Dmitry Chechulin; awarded in 1971
- Ignaty Ivanovich Fomin (1904–1989); awarded in 1971; a prominent member of the Soviet Art Academy.
- Valentin Alexandrovich Kamensky (1907–1975); awarded in 1970; author of significant town plans among which the Leningrad city plan; he also directed the post-war reconstruction works in several USSR places.
- Vladimir Korol (1912–1980); architect, pedagogue and later politician of Belarus.
- Boris Iofan; awarded 1970; designer of the Palace of the Soviets
- Georgi Mikhailovich Orlov (1901–1985), awarded in 1970; mainly active in industrial building design, he directed in particular the hydroelectric exploitation projects of Kakhovskoy (Dniester river, 1951–1955) and Bratsk (1960–1967); he also was elected first secretary of the USSR Architect Union.
- Mikayil Useynov (1905–1992); leading architect of Azerbaijan during the Soviet period.
- Aleksandr Rochegov, constructivist architect and designer of the Soviet Embassy in Havana; awarded 1991
- Felix Novikov, the last awardee (1991).

== See also ==
- Awards and decorations of the Soviet Union
- People's Artist of the USSR
- People's Doctor of the USSR
- People's Teacher of the USSR
