= Sergei Kudryavtsev (diplomat) =

Soviet intelligence officer and diplomat (1915–1998)

Sergei Mikhailovich Kudryavtsev (Russian: Сергей Михайлович Кудрявцев; 1915–1998) was a senior Soviet intelligence officer who served as the Soviet Ambassador to Cuba from August 22, 1960 to May 30, 1962. Kudryavtsev did not speak Spanish, nor did he have connections with the Cuban government. As a result, Alexander Alexeyev, who had been in Cuba since 1959, served as his cultural advisor for the duration of his appointment. Kudryavstev was expelled from Cuba in 1962 by Fidel Castro for open and excessive political activities, and was replaced by Alexeyev.

== Awards and honors ==
- Order of the Badge of Honour (3 November 1944)
- Three Orders of the Red Banner of Labour (5 November 1945, 31 December 1966, 22 October 1971)
