= Chief of Staff of the Presidential Executive Office (Russia) =

Russian administrative office

Chief of Staff of the Presidential Executive Office of the Russian Federation Руководитель Администрации Президента Российской Федерации
- Coat of arms of the Russian Federation

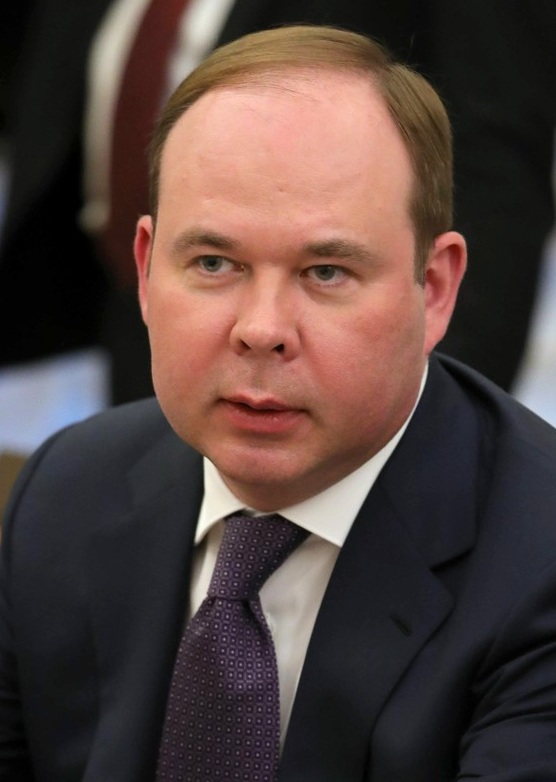
- Incumbent; Anton Vaino since August 12, 2016
- Residence: Kremlin, Moscow
- Appointer: The president
- Term length: Undefined
- Inaugural holder: Yury Petrov
- Formation: 5 August 1991
- Website: http://en.kremlin.ru/structure/administration/members

The chief of staff of the Presidential Executive Office of the Russian Federation (Russian: Руководи́тель Администра́ции Президе́нта Росси́йской Федера́ции, romanized: Rukovoditel' Administratsii Prezidenta Rossiyskoy Federatsii), also known as the Kremlin chief of staff, is the head of the Presidential Executive Office. The position was created by Boris Yeltsin's decree in 1991. The chief of staff is appointed by the president and responsible for general management of presidential activity.

The incumbent chief of staff is Anton Vaino, who assumed the position in August 2016.

== Responsibilities ==
In accordance with the Regulations on Administration approved by Presidential Decree on April 6, 2004 (No. 490):

- Represents management in the federal bodies of state power, bodies of state power of subjects and local authorities, as well as in Russian, international and foreign organizations;
- Provides overall management of the heads of departments of administration and heads of other independent units of administration;
- Allocate responsibilities to Deputy Chief of Staff;
- Coordinates the activities of presidential helpers and advisors and distributes questions relating to their jurisdiction;
- Coordinates the activities of presidential plenipotentiaries in federal districts;
- On behalf of the president, makes proposals for the preparation of draft federal laws, decrees and orders, as well as the adoption of decisions and orders of the government;
- Acts as the president for approval of draft regulations on administration and other independent division of administration;
- Presents candidates for appointments and submits proposals to the president on the dismissal of officials
- Comments on structure and strength of the Russian president, and other independent units of administration, operational management assigned to them and (or) that they lead;
- Comments on proposals of the secretary of the Russian Federation Security Council and the structure and staffing of the unit of the Security Council;
- Comments on presentation of presidential representatives in federal districts of the structure and personnel of their vehicles;
- Approve the list of information to be classified;
- Appoint and dismiss the head of the administration of its secretariat and his deputies, deputy chief and other employees of the independent divisions and the Deputy Plenipotentiary Representative of the President in the Federal District;
- Define the powers of the First Deputy Chief of Staff on the appointment and dismissal of other officials, their promotion and application to them of disciplinary measures;
- Issue orders on administration activities within its competence;
- Provide certification of personnel administration, confer qualification level administration employees, except those employees who are assigned to the qualification level by President;
- Organize the execution of Presidential orders;
- Request and receive necessary information from federal bodies of state power, bodies of state power of subjects, local authorities, as well as from organizations;
- Organize training and exercise performance for the budget request for support of the President, content administration, maintenance and support of Presidential plenipotentiaries in federal districts and the content of their deputies, as well as the content of the Ombudsman at the European Court of Human Rights;
- Disposes of budgetary funds in accordance with budget administration;
- On behalf of the president makes a separate estimate of the administration changes that should not result in exceeding the expenditure of funds allocated from the federal budget for the relevant year;
- Designate one of the first deputies chief of staff to dispose of budget funds in accordance with budget administration.

== Office holders ==
#	Portrait	Chief	Term of office	President
1		Yury Petrov	5 August 1991 — 19 January 1993	Boris Yeltsin
2		Sergey Filatov	19 January 1993 — 15 January 1996	Boris Yeltsin
3		Nikolai Yegorov	15 January — 15 July 1996	Boris Yeltsin
4		Anatoly Chubais	15 July 1996 — 7 March 1997	Boris Yeltsin
5		Valentin Yumashev	11 March 1997 — 7 December 1998	Boris Yeltsin
6		Nikolay Bordyuzha	7 December 1998 — 19 March 1999	Boris Yeltsin
7		Alexander Voloshin	19 March 1999 — 30 October 2003	Boris Yeltsin
7		Alexander Voloshin	19 March 1999 — 30 October 2003	Vladimir Putin
8		Dmitry Medvedev	30 October 2003 — 14 November 2005	Vladimir Putin
9		Sergey Sobyanin	14 November 2005 — 7 May 2008 (acting until 12 May 2008)	Vladimir Putin
10		Sergey Naryshkin	12 May 2008 — 15 December 2011	Dmitry Medvedev
—		Vladislav Surkov	20—22 December 2011 (acting)	Dmitry Medvedev
11		Sergei Ivanov	22 December 2011 — 12 August 2016	Dmitry Medvedev
11		Sergei Ivanov	22 December 2011 — 12 August 2016	Vladimir Putin
12		Anton Vaino	12 August 2016 — present	Vladimir Putin
