= Cuba–Russia relations =

- Cuba: Russia

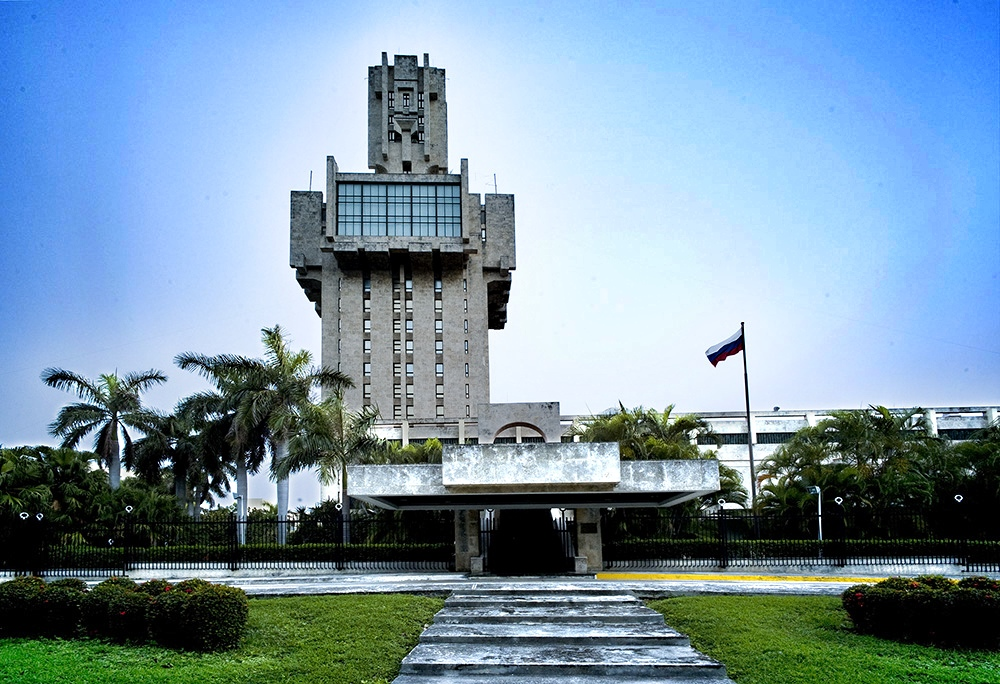
Embassy of Russia in Havana

Cuba–Russia relations (Russian: Российско-кубинские отношения, Spanish: Relaciones Ruso-Cubanas) reflect the political, economic and cultural exchanges between Cuba and Russia. These countries have had close cooperation since the days of the Soviet Union. Russia has an embassy in Havana and a consulate-general in Santiago de Cuba. Cuba has an embassy in Moscow and an honorary consulate in Saint Petersburg. Around 55,000 people of Russian descent live in Cuba.

A 2016 survey showed that 67% of Cubans had a favorable view of Russia, with only 8% expressing an unfavorable view.

== Cuba and the Soviet Union ==
Diplomatic ties between the Soviet Union and Cuba were established after the 1959 Cuban Revolution. Cuba became dependent on Soviet markets and military aid and was a major ally of the Soviet Union during the Cold War. In 1972, Cuba joined the COMECON, an economic organization of communist countries that was dominated by the Soviet Union, which had the largest economy.

== Cuba and the Russian Federation ==
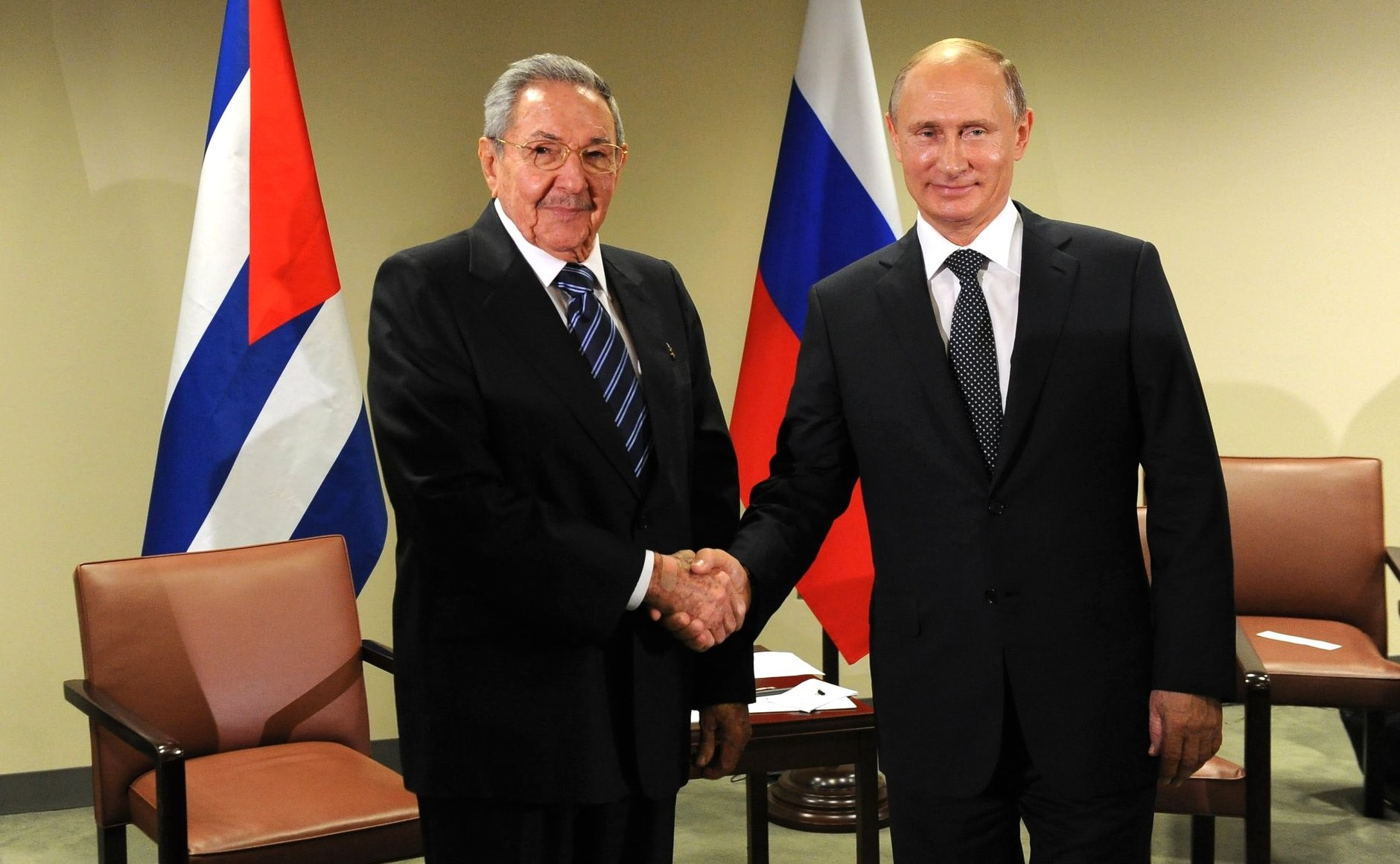
Vladimir Putin with Raúl Castro in 2015.

Since the fall of the Soviet Union in 1991, Cuba and Russia have maintained their diplomatic relations. After Vladimir Putin came to power in 2000, relations between both countries improved greatly. In December 2000, Putin visited Cuba and he along with Fidel Castro called for the lifting of the embargo on Cuba. Russia is still Cuba's leading creditor and the two countries maintain close economic ties with each other. Cuba strongly supported Russia's position in the Russo-Georgian War. In the fall of 2008, Cuba and Russia increased joint cooperation with each other in the field of economics. Russian deputy Prime Minister Igor Sechin visited Cuba several times in 2008 in order to increase economic and political ties. Russia was the first country to provide aid to Cuba after three hurricanes devastated the country in the fall of 2008. The assistance provided by Russia included four planes of food, medical supplies and construction supplies.

In November 2008, Russian President Dmitry Medvedev visited Cuba to strengthen economic ties and to allow Russian companies to drill for oil offshore in Cuban waters, and to allow Russian mining companies to mine nickel in Cuba. Raúl Castro traveled for a week-long visit to Moscow from January 28, 2009, to February 4, 2009. The talks included $20 million worth of credit to Havana, and 25,000 tons of grain as humanitarian aid to Cuba.

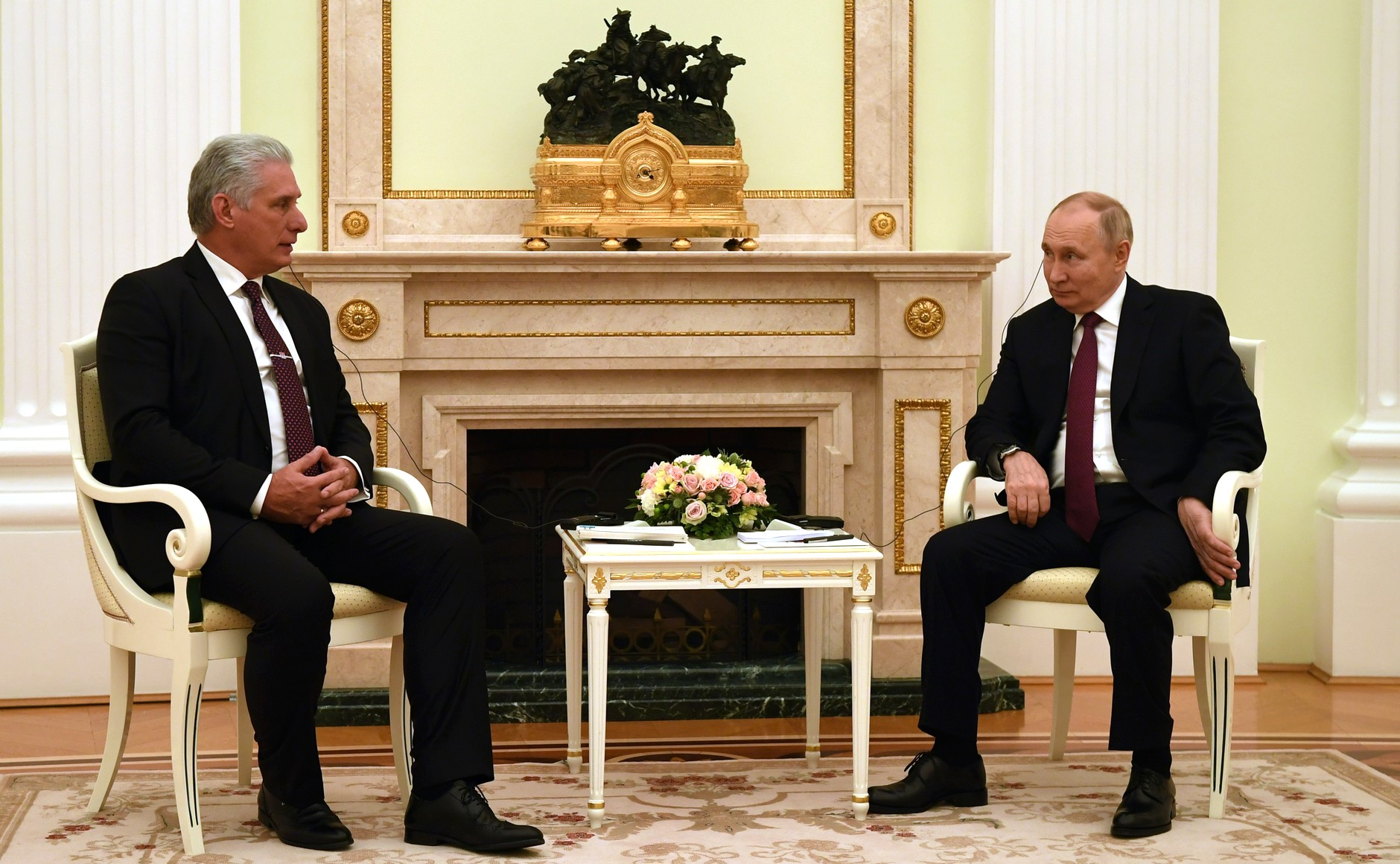
Russian President Putin with Cuban First Secretary Miguel Díaz-Canel, 22 November 2022

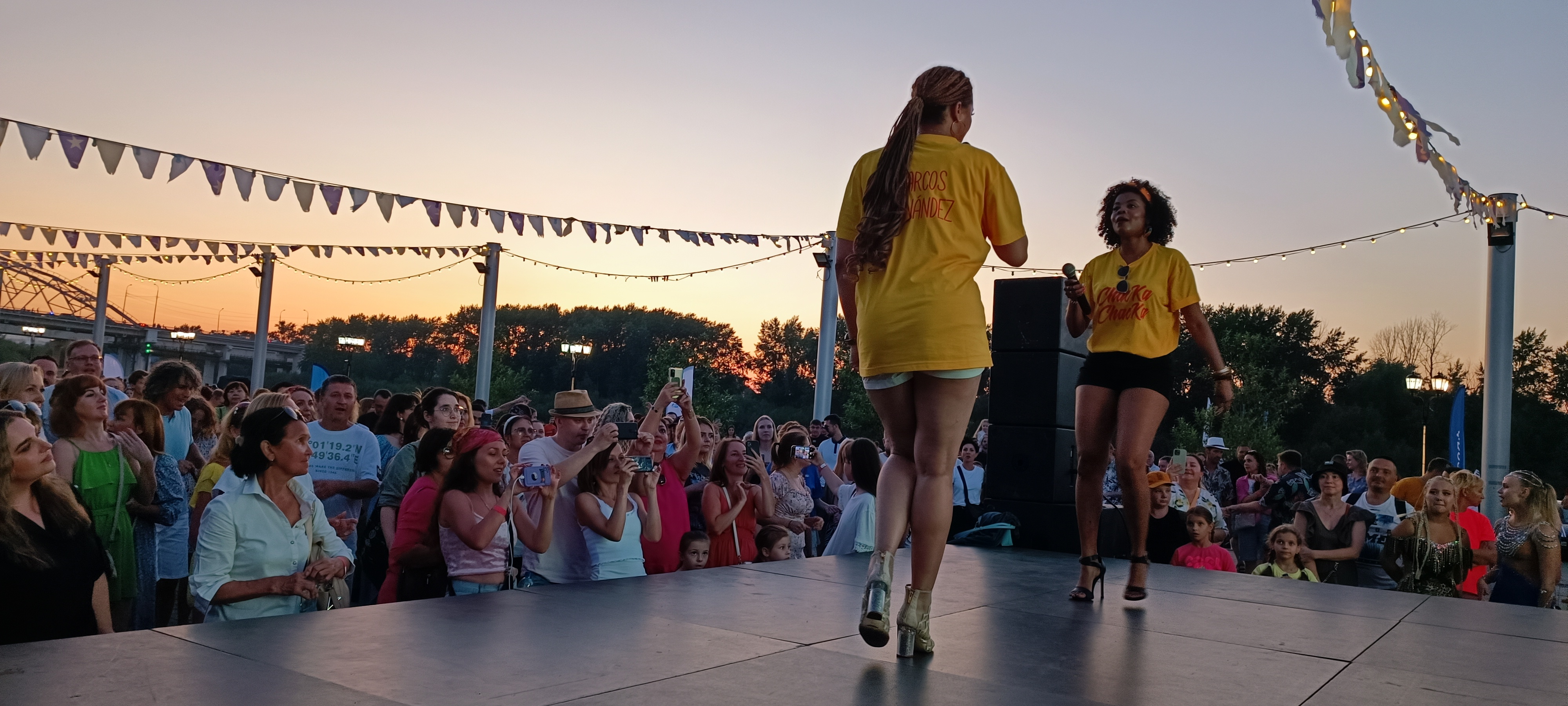
Cuban dance festival in Tyumen, Russia, 29 July 2023

In July 2009, Russia began oil exploration in the Gulf of Mexico after signing a deal with Cuba. Under the new agreement, Russia has also granted a loan of $150 million to buy construction and agricultural equipment. In 2013, Medvedev again visited Cuba in which he signed agreements on education, health, hydrometeorology, aeronautics and space technology.

After Russia annexed Crimea from Ukraine in March 2014, Cuba recognized Crimea as a part of Russia.

In July 2014, Vladimir Putin also visited Cuba, where he touted a decision to wipe clean 90 percent of the island's $35 billion debt to Moscow and announced deals to invest in Cuba's offshore oil industry.

During the 2022 Russian invasion of Ukraine, the Cuban government blamed the United States for the crisis in Ukraine and backed Russia's right to "self-defense" against NATO expansion, but did not endorse the invasion, saying the conflict should be resolved diplomatically. First Secretary of the Communist Party of Cuba Miguel Díaz-Canel visited Vladimir Putin in Moscow in November 2022, and the two leaders criticized "unfair" economic sanctions against Cuba and Russia. They also opened a monument to Fidel Castro in one of Moscow's districts.

In January 2023 and May 2023, the two countries announced a series of agreements. Russia agreed to supply Cuba with 1.64 million tons of oil and oil products each year and assist with technology for oil exploration in the Boca de Jaruco oil deposit. It also committed to building a hydroelectric plant in Santiago de Cuba and a solar plant. Russia stated that it would modernize a Cuban steel mill, help and administer and modernize sugar plants, help in agricultural processing, and contribute to the development of light industry in Cuba. Russia also resumed direct flights to Cuba and announced the building of a hotel for Russians in Cuba and a new airline terminal. In turn, Cuba agreed to offer thirty-year land leases for Russian investors, allow for duty-free importation of Russian machinery, help establish a trading house, provide preferential tax treatment for Russian investors, provide for expedited repatriation of profits to Russia, and allow Russian enterprises in Cuba the ability to directly hire and dismiss employees, which is not normally allowed for foreign enterprises in Cuba.

The countries also agreed to several joint educational programs covering agriculture, biomedicine, and biopharmaceuticals. An interparliamentary commission was announced to collaborate on finance, investment, energy, tourism, agriculture, and opposing foreign sanctions.

In September 2023, Cuba's foreign minister Bruno Rodríguez announced that the Cuban foreign ministry had uncovered a human trafficking network operating from Russia aiming to recruit Cuban citizens living in both Russia and Cuba to fight as mercenaries against Ukraine. In a press release, Cuba's foreign ministry said "Cuba is not part of the war in Ukraine" and that "Cuba has a firm and clear historical position against mercenaryism".

First Secretary of the Communist Party of Cuba Miguel Díaz-Canel visited Russia in May 2025 to attend that year's Moscow Victory Day Parade marking the 80th anniversary of the Soviet Union's triumph over Germany, Japan, and their client states in the Great Patriotic War.

== See also ==
- Foreign relations of Cuba
- Foreign relations of Russia
- List of ambassadors of Russia to Cuba
