= Aleksandr Rochegov =

Aleksandr Grigoryevich Rochegov (Russian: Александр Григорьевич Рочегов; 19 February 1917 – 2 December 1998) was a Soviet and Russian architect, and from 1992 to 1998 president of the Russian Academy of Architecture and Construction Sciences. In 1991 he was awarded the title of People's Architect of the USSR, and in 1990 he was awarded the USSR State Prize.

== Buildings ==
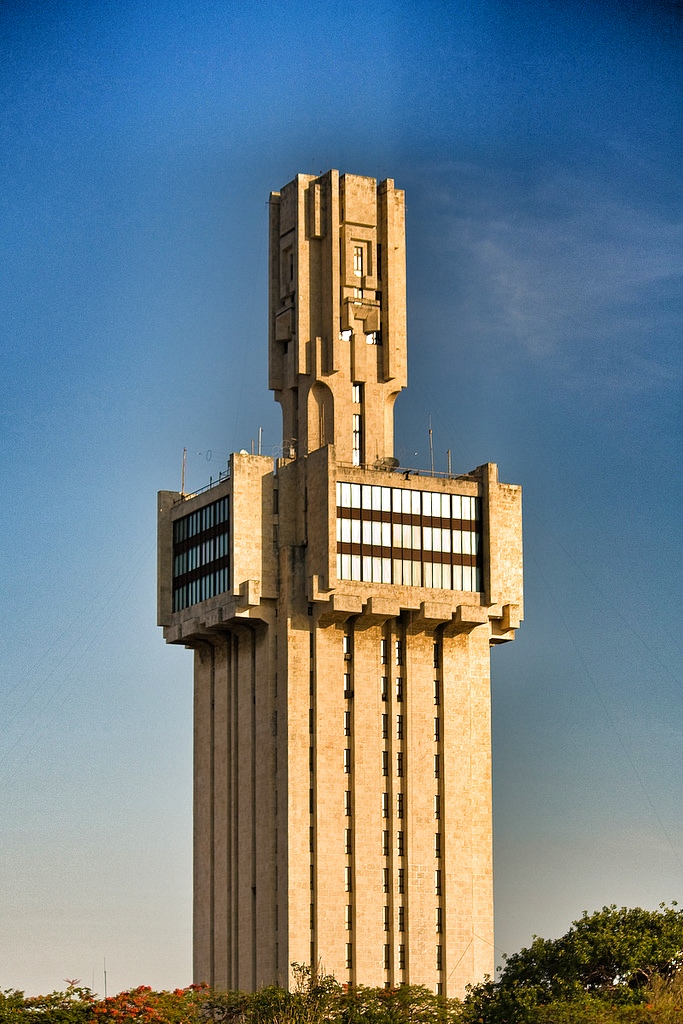
Embassy of Russia, Havana, 1985

- Large projects of multiple buildings along the Leningradskoye Highway in Moscow
- Hotel Leningradskaya, currently the Hilton Moscow Leningradskaya, Moscow
- Design and reconstruction of the city center of Tashkent, Uzbek SSR after the 1966 earthquake
- "Moscovsky" department store on Komsomolskaya Square in Moscow
- Embassy of Russia, Havana, Cuba (1985)

== Awards and honors ==
- Order of the Red Star (1952)
- Two Orders of the Red Banner of Labour (1966, 1971)
- State Hamza Prize (1970)
- Honored Architect of the RSFSR (1976)
- Order of Friendship of Peoples (1978)
- Order of the Badge of Honour (1986)
- Order of the Patriotic War, 2nd class (1986)
- USSR State Prize (1990)
- People's Architect of the USSR (1991)
- Order of Honour (1996)
- Order "For Merit to the Fatherland", 3rd class (1997)
