= Embassy of Russia, Havana =

Diplomatic mission in Republic of Cuba

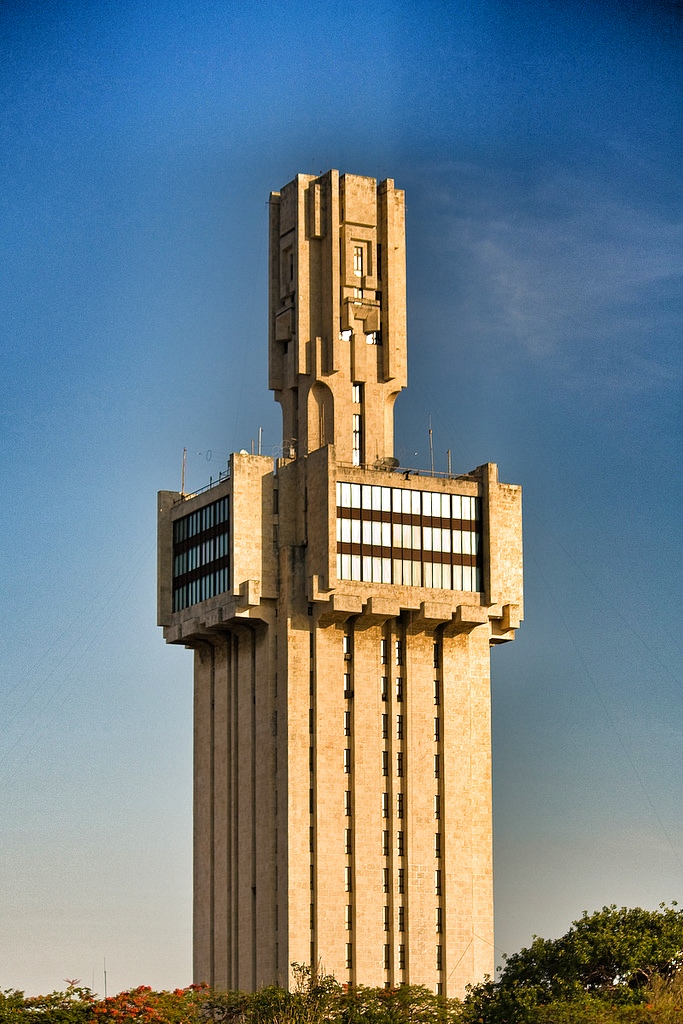
- Interactive map of the Embassy of Russia, Havana area

General information
- Architectural style: Constructivism, Brutalism
- Coordinates: 23°06′45″N 82°26′09″W
- Construction started: 1978
- Completed: 1987

Design and construction
- Architect: Aleksandr Rochegov

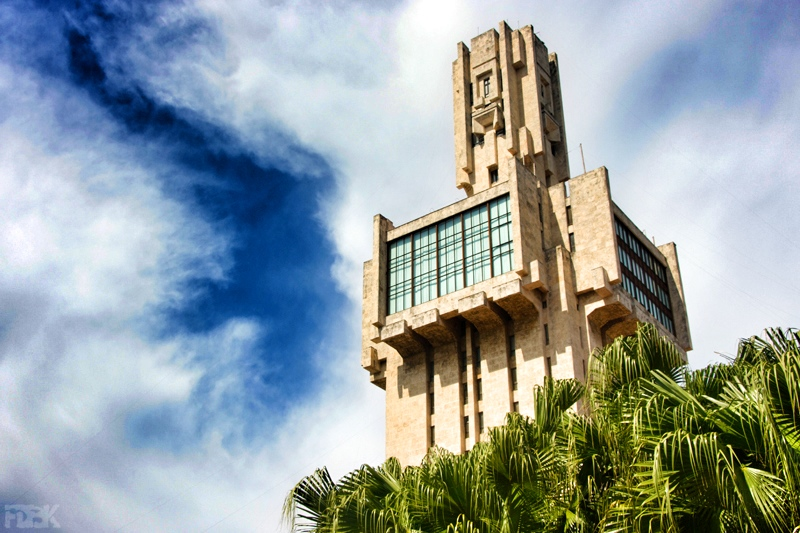
Embassy of Russia in Havana

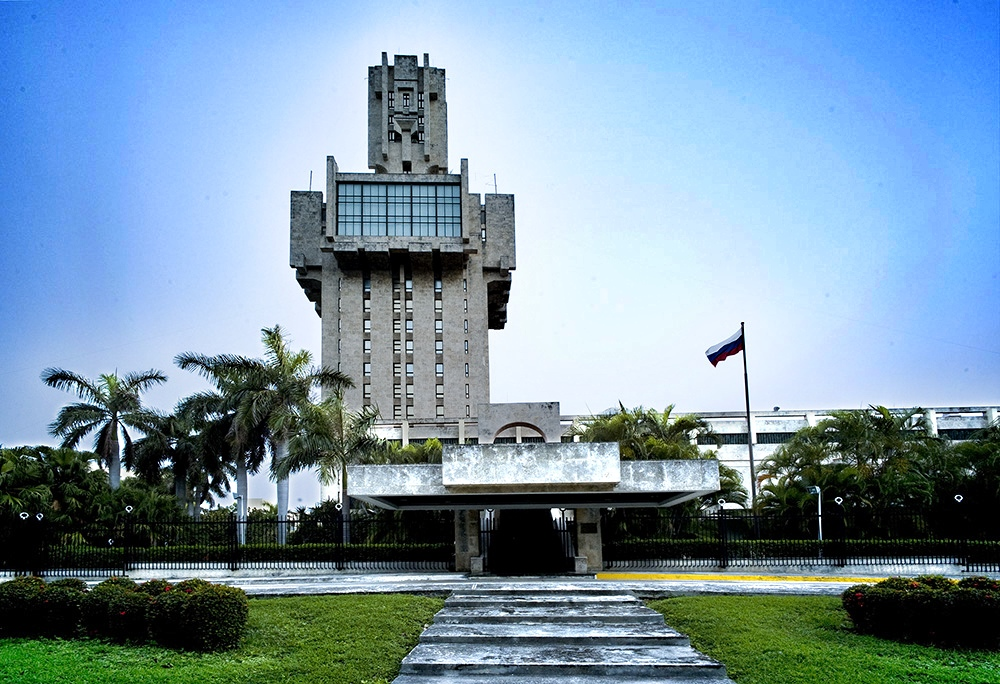
Embassy of Russia in Havana

The Embassy of Russia in Havana is the headquarters of the diplomatic mission of the Russian Federation in the Republic of Cuba. It is well known for its striking constructivist building in the Miramar district of the city, built by architect Aleksandr Rochegov. Some liken it to a sword, others to a syringe.

== History ==
The embassy is located at #6402 Quinta Avenida (Fifth Avenue, Miramar's prestigious boulevard), between Calles 62 and 66, on a site of about 4 hectares (9.9 acres). Construction began in December 1978 and was completed in November 1987. The embassy opened as the Soviet embassy, in an era when Soviet influence in Cuba was immense, and transitioned to its status as the Russian Embassy after the fall of the Soviet Union in 1991.

In the 1980s, the embassy was jokingly called the "control tower", a double entendre alluding to both the building's resemblance to an ATC tower and to the USSR's dominant position in the bilateral relationship.

== Ambassadors ==
- List of ambassadors of Russia to Cuba
- 25 December 1991 – 6 May 2000: Arnold Kalinin
- 27 June 2000 – 14 April 2008: Andrey Dmitriev
- 14 April 2008 – 18 June 2018: Mikhail Kamynin
- 18 June 2018 - 10 February 2023: Andrey Guskov
- 10 February 2023 - present: Viktor Koronelli

== See also ==
- Cuba–Russia relations
- List of diplomatic missions of Russia
