= Sergey Alexandrovich Filatov =

Russian politician (1936–2023)

Sergey Filatov
- Сергей Филатов
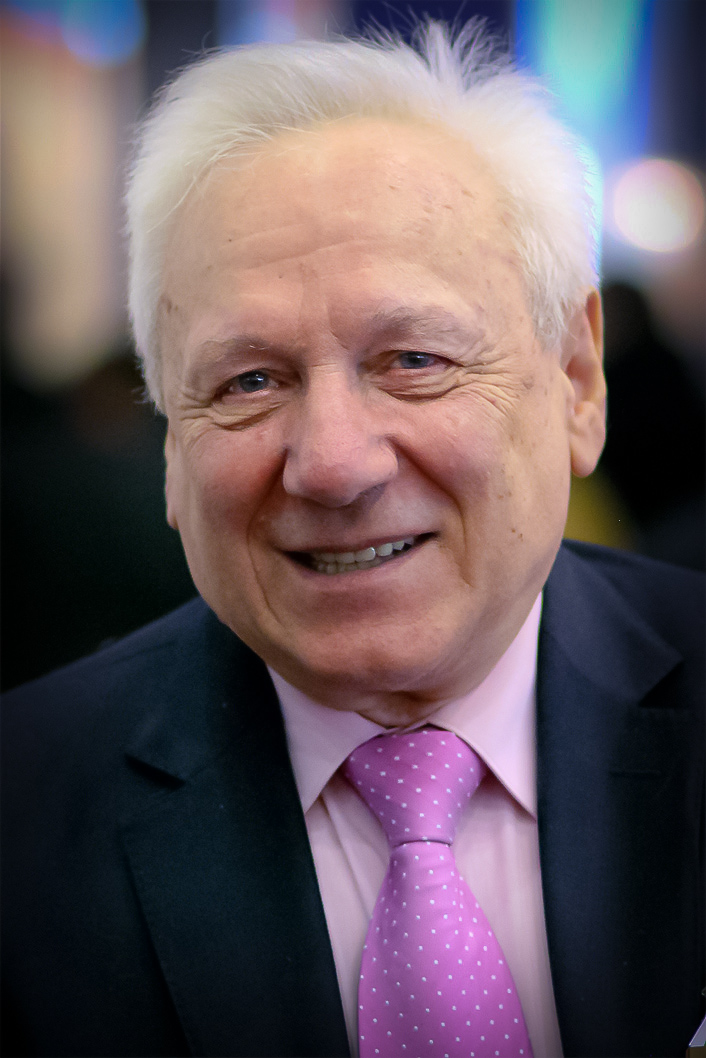
- Filatov in 2011

Kremlin Chief of Staff
- In office 19 January 1993 – 15 January 1996
- President: Boris Yeltsin
- Preceded by: Yury Petrov
- Succeeded by: Nikolai Yegorov

First Deputy Chairman of the Supreme Soviet
- In office 1 November 1991 – 28 January 1993
- Chairman: Ruslan Khasbulatov

Personal details
- Born: 10 July 1936 Moscow, Russian SFSR, USSR
- Died: 25 August 2023 (aged 87)
- Children: 2 daughters
- Education: Moscow Power Engineering Institute

Sergey Alexandrovich Filatov (Russian: Сергей Александрович Филатов, 10 July 1936 – 25 August 2023) was a Russian statesman, who was the chief of Russian presidential executive office from 1993 to 1996, during Boris Yeltsin's first term.

== Early life ==
Sergey Filatov was born on 10 July 1936 in Moscow in the family of the poet Alexander Fyodorovich Filatov (1913–1985). In 1964 he graduated from the Moscow Power Engineering Institute as an electrical engineer. Candidate of Sciences in engineering. He worked at the "Hammer and Sickle" metallurgical plant in Moscow, and Jose Marti Metallurgical Plant in Cuba. He was the head of the laboratory, and since 1986 the head of the department of control systems in the A.I. Tselikov Scientific Research Institute of Metallurgical Engineering.

== Political career ==
In 1990 Filatov was elected People's Deputy of the RSFSR, a member of the Soviet of the Republic, the lower chamber of the Supreme Soviet of Russia. He was a member of the two Supreme Soviet's Committees: the committee on freedom of conscience, religion, mercy and charity, and the committee on economic reform and property. During the August putsch of 1991 Filatov headed the defence staff of the White House. In 1991, he was appointed secretary of the Presidium of the Supreme Soviet, and at the end of the year was elected First Deputy Chairman of the Supreme Soviet and became a permanent member of the Security Council of Russia.

From January 1993 to January 1996, Filatov was the head of the Presidential Administration of Russia, as well as the chairman of the Expert and Analytical Council under the President of Russia and the chairman of the Presidential Commission on state awards in the field of literature and art. In 1996, Filatov left the state service and he was appointed deputy head of Boris Yeltsin's reelection headquarters. He headed the Public Movement to Support the President (ODOPP) and later the All-Russian Coordination Council (OKS), which was in charge of 1996 and 1997 election campaigns of Yeltsin-appointed governors.

== Civic activity ==
Filatov was a member of the Union of Journalists of Russia and chairman of the Union of Writers of Moscow. In April 2006, he became the Chairman of the Expert Council of the "Attention" Foundation, which held the first ADHD-themed forum in Russia. In March 2014, he signed an appeal against Russian government policy in Crimea.

== Death ==
Sergey Filatov died on 25 August 2023, at the age of 87.

== Awards ==
- Order of Honour (20 July 2011) — for the development of national culture and art and many years of activity.
- Order of Friendship (5 July 1996) — for services to the state and many years of conscientious work.
- Medal "Defender of a Free Russia" (5 August 1994) — for the fulfillment of civic duty in the defence of democracy and the constitutional order on 19–21 August 1991, a great contribution to the implementation of democratic reforms, strengthening friendship and international cooperation.
- Medal "In Commemoration of the 850th Anniversary of Moscow"
- Medal "Veteran of Labor"
- USSR State Prize (1988, as a part of a collective) — for the development and implementation of a resource-saving combined process of continuous casting and rolling of steels and alloys.
