= Konstantin Katushev =

Soviet and Russian politician

- Константин Катушев
- Katushev in the 1980s

Secretary of the Central Committee of the Communist Party of the Soviet Union
- In office April 10, 1968 – May 24, 1977
- Preceded by: Yuri Andropov
- Succeeded by: Konstantin Rusakov

Deputy Chairman of the Council of Ministers of the Soviet Union
- In office March 16, 1977 – July 29, 1982
- Prime Minister: Alexey Kosygin; Nikolay Tikhonov

1st Minister of Foreign Economic Relations of the Soviet Union
- In office January 15, 1988 – December 1, 1991
- Prime Minister: Nikolay Ryzhkov; Valentin Pavlov
- Preceded by: Office established Boris Aristov as Minister of Foreign Trade of the Soviet Union
- Succeeded by: Office abolished

4th Chairman of the State Committee of the Soviet Union for Foreign Economic Relations
- In office November 22, 1985 – January 15, 1988
- Prime Minister: Nikolay Ryzhkov
- Preceded by: Mikhail Sergeichik
- Succeeded by: Office abolished

12th First Secretary of the Gorky Regional Committee of the Communist Party of the Soviet Union
- In office December 27, 1965 – April 18, 1968
- Preceded by: Mikhail Efremov
- Succeeded by: Nikolay Maslennikov

Personal details
- Born: October 1, 1927 Bolshoye Boldino, Nizhny Novgorod Province (now Bolsheboldinsky District, Nizhny Novgorod Region)
- Died: April 5, 2010 (aged 82) Moscow, Russian Federation
- Resting place: Troekurovskoe Cemetery
- Party: Communist Party of the Soviet Union (1952–1991)
- Spouse: Valentina Katusheva (1927)
- Children: Daughter Elena (1951)
- Parents: Fyodor Katushev (1905–1979) (father); Valentina Katusheva (1905–1972) (mother)
- Education: Gorky Polytechnic Institute (1951)
- Profession: Mechanical engineer
- Awards: Order of Lenin; Order of the October Revolution

Konstantin Fedorovich Katushev (Russian: Константи́н Фёдорович Ка́тушев; 1 October 1927 – 5 April 2010) was a Soviet party official and statesman, Secretary of the Central Committee of the Communist Party of the Soviet Union (1968–77), Deputy Chairman of the Council of Ministers of the Soviet Union (1977–82), Chairman of the State Committee of the Soviet Union for Foreign Economic Relations (1985–88), Minister of Foreign Economic Relations of the Soviet Union (1988–91).

Member of the Communist Party of the Soviet Union since 1952. Member of the Central Committee of the Communist Party of the Soviet Union (1966–1990). Deputy of the Supreme Soviet of the Soviet Union (1966–84 and 1986–89).

== Biography ==
Born into a teaching family. After school, he graduated from Gorky Polytechnic Institute, where he studied in 1945–1951 years, a mechanical engineer. He was sent to work at the Gorky Automobile Plant. After graduating from the institute, he works at a car factory in the design experimental department as a mechanic engineer for tracked vehicles and achieves such success that he was appointed deputy chief designer. An important achievement of the young engineer was the creation of the GAZ–47 amphibious armored personnel carrier. Since 1957 in party work: Secretary of the Party Bureau of the design and experimental department of the plant, since 1959, Second Secretary of the Avtozavodsky Regional Party Committee in Gorky, since 1961, Secretary of the Party Committee of the Gorky Automobile Plant. In 1963–1965, the First Secretary of the Gorky City Committee of the Communist Party of the Soviet Union.

In December 1965, Leonid Brezhnev, the General Secretary of the Soviet communist party, visited Gorky to oversee the appointment of Katushev as First Secretary of the Gorky provincial communist party. It was the first time Brezhnev ( or any other member of the top leadership since the fall of Khrushchev) had travelled to the provinces to effect a change of leadership at a local level, and the first time since Khrushchev's fall that anyone as young as Katushev had received a major promotion. This suggests that he was Brezhnev's protégé.

In April 1968, Katushev was promoted again, when he was brought to Moscow as a Secretary of the Central Committee of the Communist Party of the Soviet Union, with responsibility for relations with the ruling parties of other communist states - ie relations with socialist countries, member countries of the Council for Mutual Economic Assistance, member countries of the Warsaw Pact) - replacing the future party leader Yuri Andropov, who had been appointed head of the KGB. Katushev was the youngest of the ten Central Committee secretaries by a margin of more than eight years.

His appointment coincided with the so-called Prague Spring in Czechoslovakia, an outburst of personal freedom unprecedented in a communist-ruled state, which was crushed by Warsaw Pact invasion in August. Reputedly, he was appointed because he was on good terms with the leader of the Prague Spring, Alexander Dubček. During the so-called 'normalisation' that followed, Kulakov travelled to Prague to oversee the removal of Josef Smrkovský from the post of chairman of the federal assembly, and again in April 1969 to bring about Dubcek's enforced resignation and his replacement by Gustáv Husák, who ruled Czechoslovakia until the communist system collapsed in 1991.

In 1972, Katushev was confirmed as head of the reorganised Department of the Central Committee of the Communist Party of the Soviet Union for communications with the communist and workers' parties of the socialist countries.

In May 1977, he was suddenly removed from the party secretariat, and moved to the lesser post of Deputy Chairman of the Council of Ministers of the Soviet Union, responsible for relations with other Comecon governments. Reputedly, the reason for his demotion was that during a visit to Vietnam, he had failed in his mission to get the heads of the Vietnamese communist party to award Brezhnev a medal to mark his 70th birthday. In 1977–1980 Permanent Representative of the Soviet Union in the Council for Mutual Economic Assistance, then Deputy Chairman of the Council Ministers of the Soviet Union – curator of the ministries of railways, the Navy, transport construction, communications.

In 1982–1985, Katushev was the ambassador of the Soviet Union to Cuba. In 1985, soon after the rise of Mikhail Gorbachev as the last head of the Soviet communist party, he was recalled to Moscow as Chairman of the State Committee of the Soviet Union for Foreign Economic Relations. In 1988–1991, he was Minister of Foreign Economic Relations of the Soviet Union. Then a personal pensioner of federal significance.

In the post–Soviet period of Russian history, he held executive positions in a number of commercial banks ("Diamant", "VIP–Bank").

He was buried on April 5, 2010, at the Troekurovsky Cemetery in Moscow.

Academician of the International Academy of Spiritual Unity of the Nations of the World, Academician and Professor of the Academy of Security, Defense and Law Enforcement Problems.

== Awards ==
- 3 Orders of Lenin;
- Order of the October Revolution (September 30, 1987);
- Medals;
- Order of the Renaissance of the Republic of Cuba;
- Orders and medals of the Mongolian People's Republic, Vietnam, Afghanistan.

Preceded by Mikhail Lesechko	Representative of the Soviet Union in the Council for Mutual Economic Assistance 1977—1980	Succeeded by Nikolay Talyzin
Preceded by Vitaly Vorotnikov	Extraordinary and Plenipotentiary Ambassador of the Soviet Union to Cuba July 31, 1982 – November 22, 1985	Succeeded by Aleksandr Kapto
