= Felix Novikov =

Soviet and Russian architect (1927–2022)

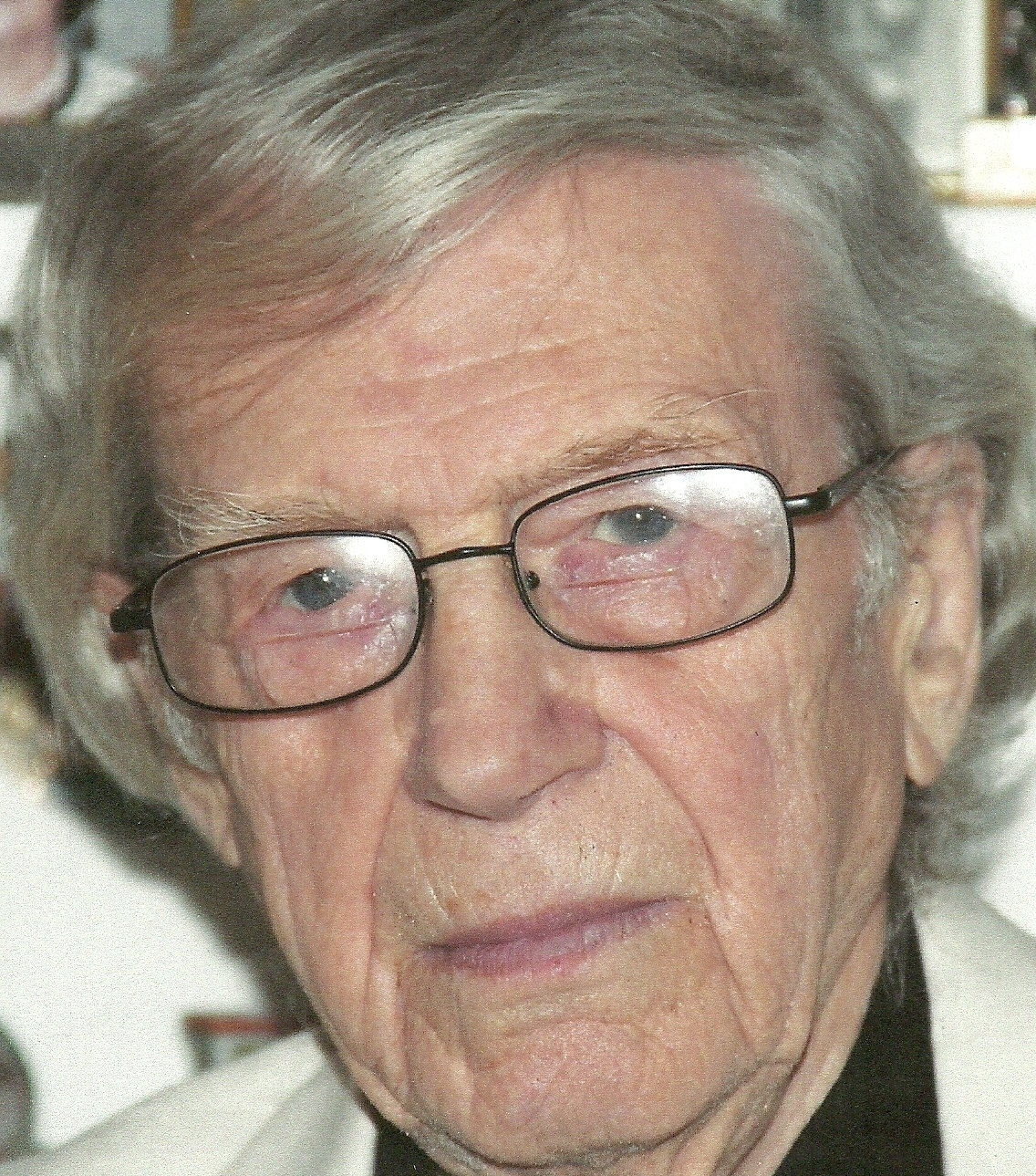
Novikov in 2012

Felix Aronovich Novikov (Russian: Феликс Аронович Новиков, 3 August 1927 – 18 August 2022) was a Soviet and Russian architect. In 1991, he was awarded the honorary title of People's Architect of the USSR, becoming the last awardee of the title.

His architectural projects span the period between the 1950s and the 1980s. The earlier ones belong to the mainstream tradition of the Soviet architecture, however, starting from the 1960s, Novikov's projects became innovative. His main projects included Krasnopresnenskaya metro station (1954, together with Victor Yegerev, M. Konstantinov, and I. Pokrovsky), residential buildings on embankments of the Yauza (1950s, together with Yegerev and Pokrovsky), and the building of the Palace of Young Pioneers, all in Moscow.

Novikov died in Rochester, New York on 18 August 2022, at the age of 95.

== Literature ==
- Berkovich, Gary. Reclaiming a History. Jewish Architects in Imperial Russia and the USSR. Volume 4. Modernized Socialist Realism: 1955–1991. Weimar und Rostock: Grunberg Verlag. 2022. P.53. ISBN 978-3-933713-65-0.
