= Marie Hušková =

Czech mathematician and statistician

Marie Hušková (born 1942) is a Czech mathematician who worked in theoretical statistics and change-point problem. She was a doctoral student of Jaroslav Hájek.

In 2012 she was awarded by title Officer of the Order of Orange-Nassau for long term cooperation with Dutch mathematical statisticians. She is also a Fellow of the Institute of Mathematical Statistics, and an Elected Member of the International Statistical Institute.
