= Alexander Alexeyev (diplomat) =

Soviet intelligence agent and diplomat

Alexander Ivanovich Alexeyev (Russian: Александр Иванович Алексеев, born Shitov (Шитов); 14 August 1913 – 19 June 2001, in Moscow) was a Soviet intelligence agent who posed first as a journalist and later a diplomat. His arrival in Havana on 1 October 1959 inaugurated a new era in Cuba–Soviet Union relations. Alexeyev was later appointed as the Soviet Ambassador to Cuba, and played a vital role in easing tensions during the Cuban Missile Crisis.

== Life before the Cuban Revolution ==
Alexeyev graduated from the faculty of history of the Moscow State University and in the late 1930s took part in the Spanish Civil War as an interpreter. From 1941 he worked as a diplomat and intelligence officer, first in Iran (1941) and then in France (1944–1951).

Between 1954 and 1958 Alexeyev served as the first secretary of the Russian Embassy in Argentina. As events began to take shape in Cuba, the Soviet leadership realized that it lacked any meaningful tactical information on the new Cuban government. The Soviet press had hitherto used words such as "uprising," "rebellion," or "guerrilla war" to describe Castro's 26th of July Movement. Only in 1958 did the press begin using the phrase "national liberation" to describe Castro's movement, although there is speculation that this shift was more in response to the United States' support for Fulgencio Batista than due to a real awareness of Castro's political goals. Nikita Khrushchev himself wrote later in his memoirs that he "had no idea what political course [Fidel Castro's] regime would follow." In an interview, Alexeyev admitted that, despite having a considerable background in Latin America, he himself didn't know much about the nature of the Cuban Revolution. "In Latin America," he said, "there have been a lot of revolutions, so we thought that it was just a normal Latin American revolution." Some historians have argued that Khrushchev was eager to embrace the new Cuban government in an attempt to reassert Soviet preeminence in the communist world, since the divisions between the USSR and Maoist China had come to a head by 1959.

=== Mission to Cuba ===
Alexeyev was dispatched by the Soviet government to evaluate the state of affairs in revolutionary Cuba. He applied for a visa in February 1959, but was not granted one until August. Even then, the visa technically only permitted him entrance into the country as a journalist, working for the Soviet Telegraph Agency (TASS). This may be due to the fact that Fidel Castro felt uneasy about bringing in an officially-acknowledged diplomat from the Soviet Union, which might have provoked a hostile response from Washington. However, all pretenses of Alexeyev being a "journalist" were dropped once he entered the country. He quickly became acquainted with Che Guevara, and met Fidel Castro personally on 16 October. Alexeyev understood Fidel Castro's movement as a nationalistic response to American imperialism rather than a communist revolution per se, and he wrote three articles in late 1959 reporting on these findings for the Soviet people.

== Role in the reestablishment of Cuban-Soviet relations, 1959–1960 ==
After 1952, when Batista took control of the Cuban state, the diplomatic relationship between Cuba and the Soviet Union had been completely severed. Furthermore, the Soviet Union believed (not entirely erroneously) that the Americas were under US hegemony, and that any attempt to expand communism in Latin America would be a foolish venture. Despite this uncertainty about whether or not Cuba could really become a communist ally, the Soviet government decided to take a gamble with the enigmatic Fidel Castro. The USSR was doing well by 1959, and had accomplished technological successes—such as the launch of the Sputnik—as well as foreign policy successes in places like Indonesia and Egypt. The belief that the Soviet Union had overtaken the United States in prominence was popular at the time; therefore, the Soviet government was more prone to make an aggressive play to secure the loyalty of the new Cuban regime. Castro, meanwhile, was facing a difficult choice. While his new regime desperately required economic assistance and aid, continuing a trade relationship with the United States would undercut Cuba's revolutionary credentials. The necessity of securing economic aid for the new regime naturally led Castro to favor establishing an economic relationship with the Soviet Union. Still, the situation was complicated, and Castro understood that the US would have seen any alliance between Cuba and the USSR as a threat to its national security. Furthermore, the Cuban people themselves harbored some animosity towards the Soviet Union. In an effort to bridge the two cultures, Castro asked Alexeyev to bring a Soviet cultural exposition, then being held in Mexico, to Cuba. While the Soviet government was initially hesitant to grant Castro's request, Khrushchev later relented. The Soviet cultural exposition opened in February 1960. By May of that year, a formal diplomatic relationship between the USSR and the new Cuban state had been established.

=== Deepening the diplomatic ties ===
Although Cuba and the Soviet Union had developed a tenuous relationship by early 1960, this partnership was challenged by a confrontation with Castro's previous followers in mid-1960. A group of liberals and anti-communists from 26 July Movement, led by Marcelo Fernández, wrote an ultimatum demanding that Castro publicly and unequivocally affirm his opposition to communism. While this ultimatum was never published, Castro became aware of the anti-communist movement, and perceived its strength. Indeed, he may have been very close to acquiescing to the movement's demands. However, Alexeyev changed Castro's mind by giving him a direct message from Khrushchev, which stated: "The Soviet Government wishes to express to you that it does not consider any party as an intermediary between it and you. Comrade Khrushchev...considers you to be the authentic leader of the Revolution." Essentially, this message released Castro from any obligation to Soviet-dominated organizations such as COMECON or the COMINFORM that kept communist leaders in Eastern Europe in line with Moscow. It was Khrushchev's hope that Cuba could go its own way, and that Castro would be a leader more in the mold of Nasser than Gomulka. While tensions still existed between the various factions within 26 July Movement, the message Alexeyev gave to Castro helped ease concerns that an alliance with the Soviet Union would be a breach of Cuban national sovereignty.

== Tenure as Soviet Ambassador ==
After diplomatic relations between the USSR and Cuba were established in May 1960, an ambassador was dispatched to Havana. However, this ambassador was not fluent in Spanish, nor did he have the close connections with the leaders of the Cuban government—like Castro and Guevara—that Alexeyev did. Alexeyev was therefore appointed as the "cultural adviser" to the new Soviet ambassador. Alexeyev continued to hold this position through the rest of 1960 and 1961, when the United States attempted to overthrow the revolutionary government in the Bay of Pigs invasion. In 1962, however, Moscow's interest in Cuba's strategic promise grew. Alexeyev was summoned to Moscow in May 1962, and was officially appointed to the office of Soviet Ambassador to Cuba. Initially, Alexeyev refused—he said he did not have enough expertise in economics to do the job well. However, Khrushchev responded, "No, you have good relations with Fidel Castro and with the Cuban leaders, and so as far as economics is concerned, we'll give twenty advisors if you need them." In a later interview, Alexeyev recalled being aware that Khrushchev had some scheme for Cuba in mind when he was appointed ambassador. His instincts were correct; a few days later, now-Ambassador Alexeyev was recalled to the Kremlin and explicitly asked whether Castro would consent to the deployment of medium-range nuclear weapons in Cuba. Alexeyev responded that he didn't think Castro would approve.

=== The Cuban Missile Crisis ===
To Alexeyev's surprise, Castro responded enthusiastically to Khrushchev's plan to bring the missiles to Cuba, and the operation began in August 1962, while the United States was ostensibly distracted by its mid-term elections. However, the missiles were discovered by a spy-plane on 14 October. President John F. Kennedy announced the US' discovery of the missiles on 22 October, and the Cuban Missile Crisis began. Castro was cut out of the negotiations process. While Alexeyev argues in his interview that this was because the United States wanted to "humiliate" Cuba Some historians have challenged the idea that the US maliciously cut Cuba out of the negotiation process; rather, they argue, Kennedy operated under the false hope that Cuba was somehow not responsible for the crisis, and the Soviet Union had "imposed" the missile shipment on the Cuban government. The crisis—and Cuba's snubbing from the United States—incited Castro's passion. On 27 October, Alexeyev relayed a message to Moscow that claimed that Castro was expecting an imminent attack from the United States, and encouraged the Soviet leadership to launch its nuclear arsenal, although the ambassador later denied that Castro ever called for such a strike. Although the circumstances remain unclear, Alexeyev most certainly played a critical role in helping calm Castro down. After his tenure as ambassador, Alexeyev acknowledged that the Soviet decision to place nuclear weapons in Cuba was probably a mistake, and he gained considerable respect for both President Kennedy and Premier Khrushchev for their roles in preventing the outbreak of nuclear war. Although the most dramatic moment of Alexeyev's term as ambassador to Cuba was over, he continued to hold office until 1968.

== Later life ==
In 1974 Alexeyev was appointed as the Soviet Ambassador to Madagascar, where he stayed until his retirement from diplomatic activities in 1980. After 1980 he worked as a leading official of RIA Novosti.

== Legacy ==
Alexeyev was critical to Cuban history in two main ways. First, he provided necessary intelligence and influenced the Soviet decision to pursue a rapprochement with the new Cuban government. Khrushchev, in accordance with his doctrine of peaceful coexistence, was afraid that any move in Cuba would provoke a reaction from the US. Furthermore, Fidel Castro was an enigma to the Soviet leadership; it was unclear whether he was really leading a Marxist or a nationalist revolution. Alexeyev's initial journey to Cuba convinced Khrushchev that Cuba – and Fidel Castro – would be worthwhile allies. Alexeyev's actions during the missile crisis are also of note. While it is unclear whether Castro was seriously hoping to use the Soviet missile arsenal against the United States, it is clear that Alexeyev helped calm down Castro. Khrushchev's decision to withdraw the missiles from Cuba did to some extent invoke the ire of Castro. Alexeyev's continued service as ambassador helped keep the relationship between the two countries stable.

== Publications ==
- Alexeyev, A. I. (1989). "Карибский кризис, как это было (Caribbean crisis, the way it was)". In Popov, N. V. (ed.). Открывая новые страницы...Международные вопросы: события и люди (in Russian). Moscow: Politizdat. pp. 157–172.

== Bibliography ==
- Farber, Samuel (2006). The Origins of the Cuban Revolution Reconsidered. Chapel Hill: University of North Carolina Press. ISBN 0807877093.
- Thomas, Hugh (1971). Cuba: The Pursuit of Freedom. New York: Harper & Row. ISBN 0306808277.
