= Yury Petrov (politician, born 1939) =

Soviet politician (1939–2013)

- Юрий Петров
- Petrov in 2008

Kremlin Chief of Staff
- In office 5 August 1991 – 19 January 1993
- President: Boris Yeltsin
- Preceded by: Office established
- Succeeded by: Sergey Filatov

Ambassador of the Soviet Union to Cuba
- In office 13 July 1988 – 20 September 1991
- Preceded by: Aleksandr Kapto
- Succeeded by: Arnold Kalinin

Personal details
- Born: 18 January 1939 Nizhny Tagil, Sverdlovsk Oblast, RSFSR, Soviet Union
- Died: 24 October 2013 (aged 74) Moscow, Russia
- Awards: Order of the Red Banner of Labour Order of the Badge of Honour

Yury Vladimirovich Petrov (Russian: Юрий Владимирович Петров; 18 January 1939 – 24 October 2013) was a Soviet and Russian politician.

== Biography ==
Yury Petrov was born in Nizhny Tagil. After graduating from high school in 1956, he worked at Uralvagonzavod. In 1957, after the family moved to Sverdlovsk, he worked in the Sverdlovsk design and technology institute of the Ministry of Defense Industry. In 1959 Petrov was conscripted for three-years service in the Soviet Armed Forces, then graduated from the Ural Polytechnic Institute and returned to Nizhny Tagil.

In October 1962 Petrov joined the Communist Party. Since 1967, he had been a party activist in Nizhny Tagil, reaching the post of the first secretary of city's party committee in 1974. Three years later he was elected secretary of the Sverdlovsk regional committee of the CPSU. In April 1985, after the first secretary Boris Yeltsin moved to Moscow to head the construction department of the party's Central Committee, Petrov succeeded him as de facto head of Sverdlovsk Oblast.

In July 1988 he was appointed Ambassador Extraordinary and Plenipotentiary of the USSR to the Republic of Cuba. In the summer of 1991 Yeltsin, now the newly elected president of Russia, has offered Petrov to head his presidential staff, and on 5 August 1991, he was appointed Head of the Presidential Administration of Russia. He spent 17 months in office. Petrov's resignation is explained by his disagreement with the radical neoliberal reformist course, that Yeltsin's government took after the dissolution of the Soviet Union.

From 1993 to 2001 Yury Petrov was chairman of the State Investment Corporation (Gosinkor). He died on 24 October 2013 after a long illness and was buried at the Troyekurovskoye Cemetery in Moscow.
