= List of ambassadors of Russia to Cuba =

Ambassador of the Russian Federation to the Republic of Cuba
- Emblem of the Russian Foreign Ministry

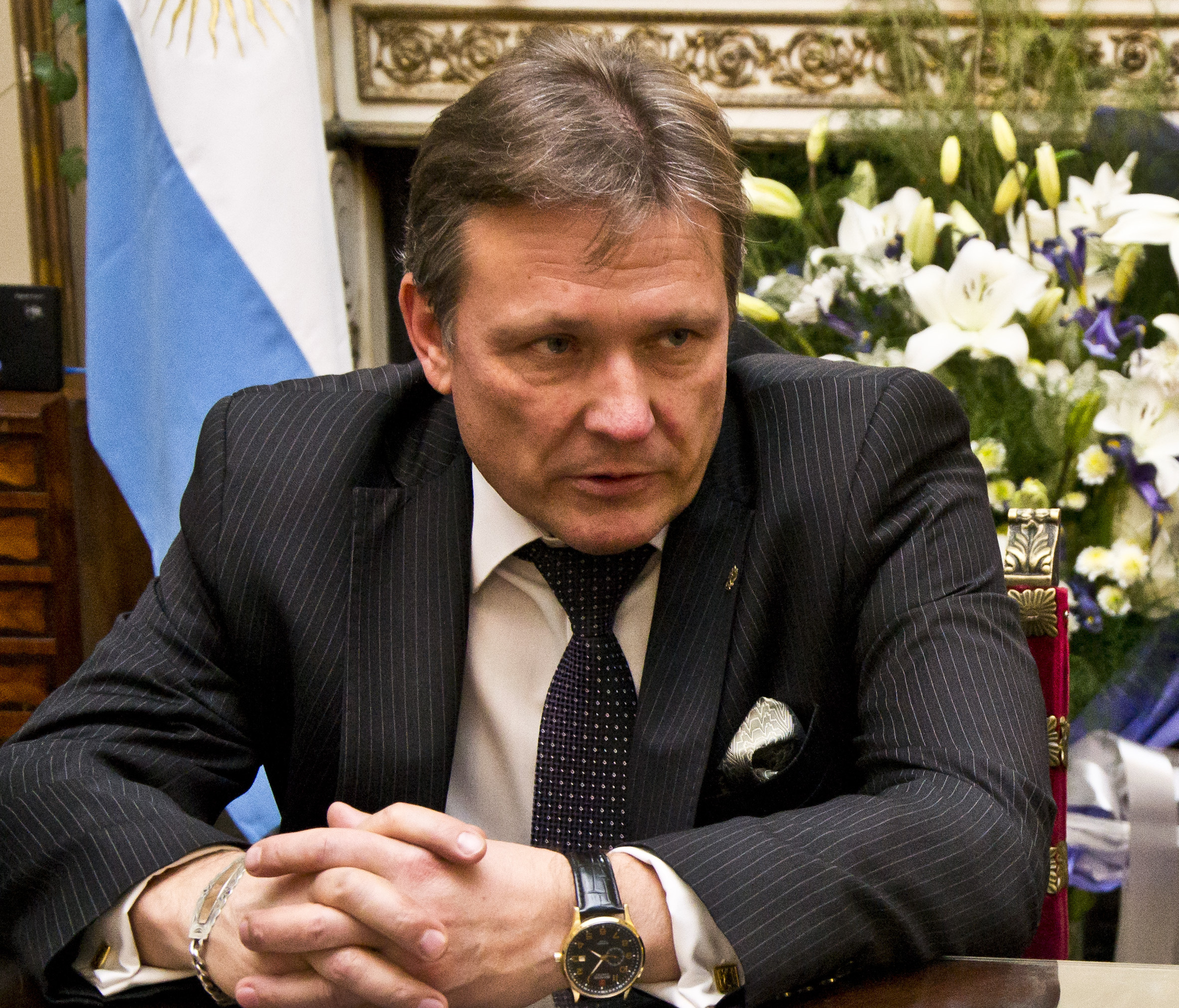
- Incumbent; Viktor Koronelli since 10 February 2023
- Ministry of Foreign Affairs; Embassy of Russia, Havana
- Style: His Excellency
- Reports to: Minister of Foreign Affairs
- Seat: Havana
- Appointer: President of Russia
- Term length: At the pleasure of the president
- Website: Embassy of Russia in Cuba

The ambassador extraordinary and plenipotentiary of Russia to Cuba is the official representative of the president and the government of the Russian Federation to the president and the government of Cuba.

The ambassador and his staff work at large in the Embassy of Russia in Havana. There is a consulate-general in Santiago de Cuba. The post of Russian ambassador to Cuba is currently held by Viktor Koronelli, incumbent since 10 February 2023.

== History of diplomatic relations ==
Diplomatic relations between Cuba and the Soviet Union were established in October 1944. Relations were initially handled through the Soviet embassy in the United States, with the incumbent ambassador to the United States, Maxim Litvinov, was given dual accreditation to Cuba on 17 October 1942. Litvinov was succeeded as ambassador to the United States, and concurrently as envoy to Cuba, by Andrei Gromyko on 21 September 1943. Following the end of Gromyko's tenure in 1946, representation was by chargé d'affaires at the Soviet mission in Cuba. This came to an end following the 1952 Cuban coup d'état by Fulgencio Batista, whose anti-communist measures involved banning the left-wing Popular Socialist Party. The Soviet government suspended diplomatic relations in protest.

Relations remained broken off until the success of the Cuban Revolution in 1959, which overthrew Batista and brought a left-wing regime to power under Fidel Castro. Diplomatic relations were restored on 8 May 1960, and Sergei Kudryavtsev was appointed the new ambassador on 8 July 1960. Representation continued through the late twentieth century. With the dissolution of the Soviet Union, Cuba recognized the Russian Federation as its successor state. The incumbent Soviet ambassador, Arnold Kalinin, continued as the Russian ambassador until 2000.

== List of representatives (1942–present) ==
=== Soviet Union to Cuba (1942-1991) ===
Name	Title	Appointment	Termination	Notes
Maxim Litvinov	Envoy	17 October 1942	21 September 1943	Concurrently representative to the United States; Credentials presented on 10 April 1943
Andrei Gromyko	Envoy	21 September 1943	25 April 1946	Concurrently representative to the United States; Credentials presented on 22 December 1943
Dmitry Zaikin	Chargé d'affaires	1946	1946	
Gennady Fomin	Chargé d'affaires	1948	3 April 1951	
1952 Cuban coup d'état - Diplomatic relations interrupted (1952-1960)
Sergei Kudryavtsev	Ambassador	8 July 1960	12 June 1962	Credentials presented on 22 August 1960
Alexander Alexeyev	Ambassador	12 June 1962	15 January 1968	Credentials presented on 18 August 1962
Aleksandr Soldatov	Ambassador	15 January 1968	4 December 1970	Credentials presented on 22 May 1968
Nikita Tolubeyev	Ambassador	4 December 1970	4 April 1979	Credentials presented on 26 January 1971
Vitaly Vorotnikov	Ambassador	4 April 1979	31 July 1982	Credentials presented on 21 April 1979
Konstantin Katushev	Ambassador	31 July 1982	22 November 1985	Credentials presented on 7 October 1982
Aleksandr Kapto	Ambassador	13 January 1986	13 July 1988	
Yury Petrov	Ambassador	13 July 1988	20 September 1991	
Arnold Kalinin	Ambassador	20 September 1991	25 December 1991	

=== Russian Federation to Cuba (1991-present) ===
Name	Title	Appointment	Termination	Notes
Arnold Kalinin	Ambassador	25 December 1991	6 May 2000	
Andrey Dmitriyev	Ambassador	27 June 2000	14 April 2008	
Mikhail Kamynin	Ambassador	14 April 2008	18 June 2018	Credentials presented on 24 April 2008
Andrey Guskov	Ambassador	18 June 2018	10 February 2023	Credentials presented on 21 November 2018
Viktor Koronelli	Ambassador	10 February 2023		Credentials presented on 15 April 2023
