= Andrei Guskov =

Russian footballer

Personal information
- Full name: Andrei Viktorovich Guskov
- Date of birth: 3 February 1985 (age 41)
- Place of birth: Dushanbe, Tajik SSR
- Height: 1.75 m (5 ft 9 in)
- Position: Defender

Youth career
- FShM Moscow

Senior career*
Years	Team	Apps	(Gls)
2001–2004	FC Torpedo Moscow	0	(0)
2004	FC Spartak Lukhovitsy	15	(0)
2005–2006	FC Metallurg Krasnoyarsk	56	(2)
2007	FC Energiya Shatura		
2008–2009	FC Krasnodar	33	(0)
2009	FC Nara-ShBFR Naro-Fominsk	17	(0)
- * Club domestic league appearances and goals

Andrei Viktorovich Guskov (Russian: Андрей Викторович Гуськов; born 3 February 1985) is a former Russian professional football player.

== Club career ==
He made his debut for FC Torpedo Moscow on 29 April 2003 in a Russian Premier League Cup game against FC Torpedo-Metallurg Moscow.

He played in the Russian Football National League for FC Metallurg Krasnoyarsk in 2006.
