= Presidency of Dmitry Medvedev =

Government of Russia from 2008 to 2012

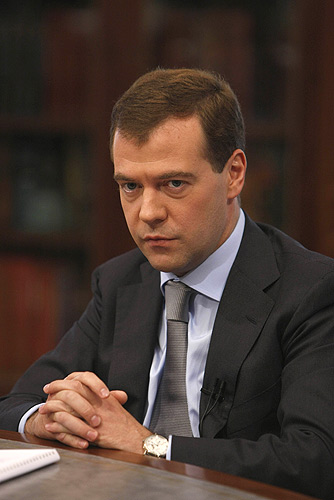
- Presidency of Dmitry Medvedev; 7 May 2008 – 7 May 2012
- President: Dmitry Medvedev
- Party: United Russia
- Election: 2008
- Seat: Moscow Kremlin
- Emblem of the President

The presidency of Dmitry Medvedev began on 8 May 2008, when he became the 3rd President of the Russian Federation. Medvedev was the Head of the Presidential Administration during the 2nd term of Vladimir Putin as president, and the Chairman of Gazprom oil company. Dmitry Medvedev was the youngest Russian leader since 1918 at the time of his inauguration.

Medvedev's main domestic agenda was the wide-ranging Medvedev modernisation programme which aimed at modernising Russia's economy and society. In particular, the massive Skolkovo innovation center, part of the modernisation programme, is often regarded as Medvedev's brainchild. Another important program was the Russian police reform, launched by Medvedev in 2009, and led to the renaming of the Policing Organisation from Militsiya to police.

In foreign policy, Medvedev assumed a more conciliatory tone than his predecessor, pursuing a closer relationship with the United States in general and with President Barack Obama in particular; The New START nuclear arms reduction treaty is regarded as Medvedev's main achievement in foreign affairs. Under Medvedev, Russia intervened on behalf of South Ossetia and Abkhazia after a Georgian military attack against the de facto independent regions, and emerged victorious in the ensuing five-day 2008 South Ossetia war.

During Medvedev's tenure, Russia also struggled with and recovered from the Great Recession. Other important decisions made by Medvedev include lowering the Duma election threshold from 7% to 5%, firing Moscow's powerful but criticised mayor Yuri Luzhkov, launching a large-scale privatisation of state-owned companies, removing state officials from the boards of state-owned companies and the extension of the Presidential term from four years to six.

== Inauguration ==
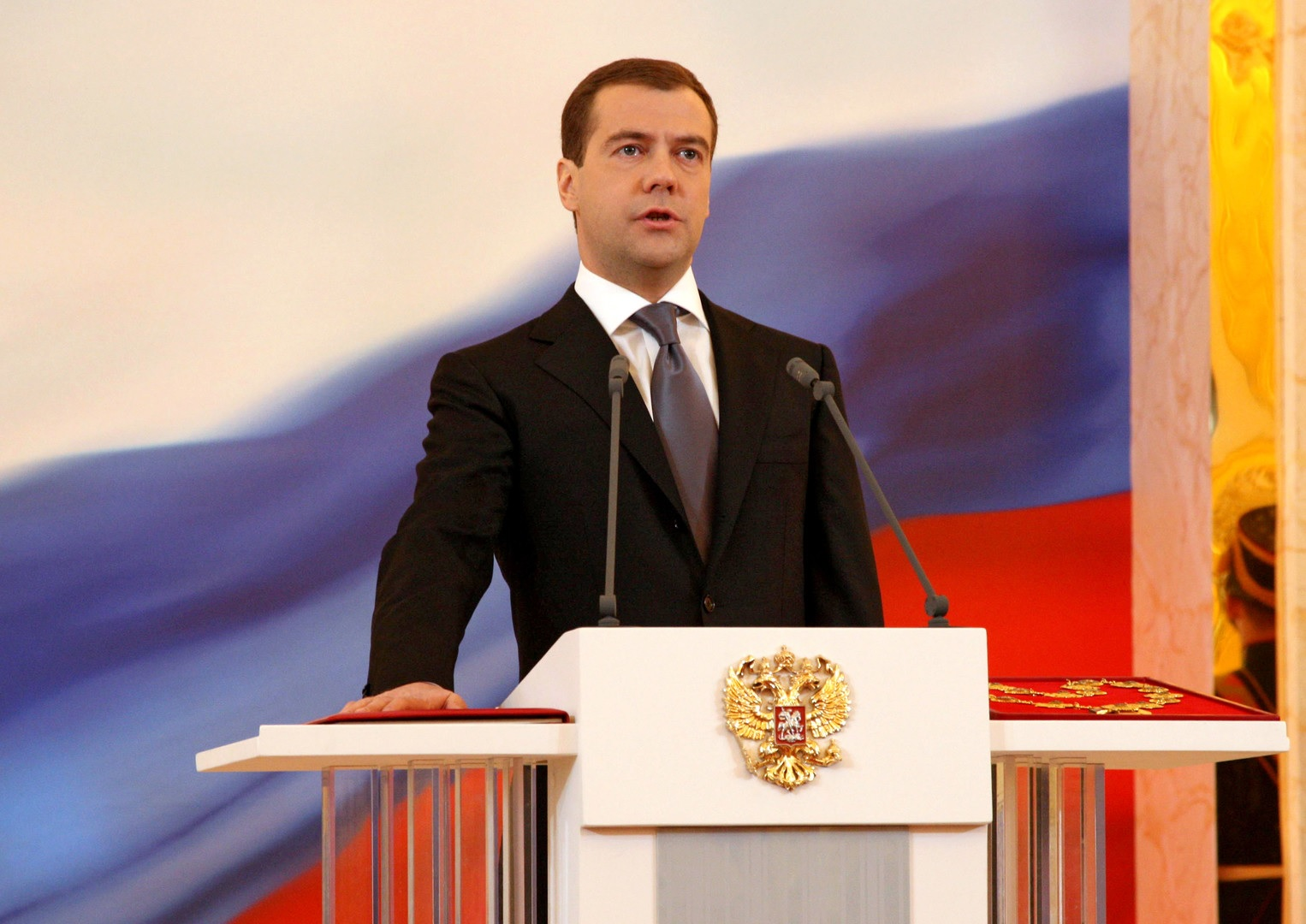
Taking the Presidential Oath in the Grand Kremlin Palace on 7 May 2008

On 7 May 2008, Dmitry Medvedev took an oath as the third President of the Russian Federation in a ceremony held in Kremlin Palace. After taking the oath of office and receiving a gold chain of double-headed eagles symbolizing the presidency, he stated: "I believe my most important aims will be to protect civil and economic freedoms....We must fight for a true respect of the law and overcome legal nihilism, which seriously hampers modern development." As his inauguration coincided with the celebration of the Victory Day on 9 May, he attended the military parade at Red Square and signed a decree to provide housing to war veterans.

== Personnel appointments ==
On 8 May 2008, Dmitry Medvedev appointed Vladimir Putin Prime Minister of Russia as he had promised during his election campaign. The nomination was approved by the State Duma with a clear majority of 392–56, with only communist deputies voting against.

On 12 May 2008, Putin proposed the list of names for his new cabinet, which Medvedev approved. Most of the personnel remained unchanged from the times of Putin's presidency, but there were a couple of high-profile changes. Minister of Justice Vladimir Ustinov was replaced by Aleksandr Konovalov; Minister of Energy Viktor Khristenko was replaced with Sergei Shmatko; Minister of Communications Leonid Reiman was replaced with Igor Shchegolev and Vitaliy Mutko received the newly created position of Minister of Sports, Tourism and Youth policy. In the presidential administration, Medvedev replaced Sergei Sobyanin with Sergei Naryshkin as the head of the administration. Furthermore, the head of the Federal Security Service Nikolai Patrushev was replaced with Alexander Bortnikov.

== Relationship with Putin ==
With Medvedev's election as president and Vladimir Putin—still the country's most popular politician—as Prime Minister, Russia was faced with an unprecedented situation: the constitutionally powerful President was now flanked with a highly influential Prime Minister. Media speculation was rife as to who of the two would be the country's real leader. "Tandem rule" became a widely used term in the media.

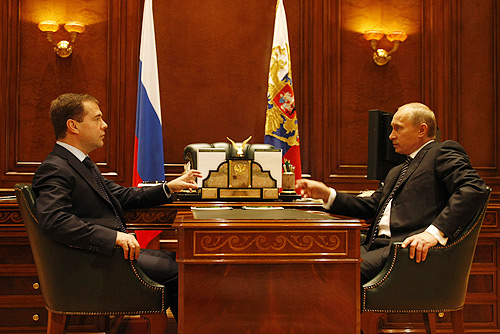
Medvedev meets with Vladimir Putin

Although the Russian constitution clearly apportions the majority of power to the president, speculation arose over the question of whether it was Medvedev or Prime Minister Vladimir Putin who actually wielded the most power. According to The Daily Telegraph, "Kremlin-watchers" note that Medvedev uses the more formal form of 'you' (Вы, 'vy') when addressing Putin, while Putin addresses Medvedev with the more informal 'ty' (ты). According to a poll conducted in September 2009 by the Levada Center in which 1,600 Russians from across Russia took part, 13% believed Medvedev held the most power, 32% Putin, and 48% both (7% failed to answer).

However, Medvedev affirmed his position of strength, stating, "I am the leader of this state, I am the head of this state, and the division of power is based on this." Officially, the Kremlin insisted that the power of the Head of State still rested with the President Medvedev, not the Prime Minister Putin.

As both Putin and Medvedev could run for president in the 2012 general elections, there was a view from some analysts that some of Medvedev's recent actions and comments were designed to separate his image from Putin's: examples noted by the BBC included his dealings in late 2010 with NATO and America, possibly designed to show himself as being better able to deal with the Western nations, and comments in November about the need for a stronger opposition in Russian politics, to present himself as a moderniser. The BBC also noted that other analysts believe the split is exaggerated, and Medvedev and Putin were "trying to maximise support for the authorities by appealing to different parts of society".

== Domestic policy ==
=== Anti-corruption efforts ===
Fighting corruption was one of the key areas of Medvedev's presidency. On 19 May 2008, Medvedev signed a decree on anti-corruption measures, which included the creation of an Anti-Corruption Council. In the first meeting of the council on 30 September 2008, Medvedev said:

"I will repeat one simple, but very painful thing. Corruption in our country has become rampant. It has become commonplace and characterises the life of the Russian society."

In July 2008, Medvedev's National Anti-Corruption Plan was published in the official Rossiyskaya Gazeta newspaper. It suggested measures aimed at making sanctions for corruption more severe, such as legislature to disqualify who state and municipal officials who commit minor corruption offences and making it obligatory for officials to report corruption. The plan ordered the government to prepare anti-corruption legislation based on these suggestions. The bill, called On Corruption Counteraction was signed into law on 25 December 2008 as Federal Law N 273-FZ. According to Professor Richard Sakwa, "Russia now at last had serious, if flawed, legislation against corruption, which in the context was quite an achievement, although preliminary results were meagre." Russia's score in Corruption Perceptions Index rose from 2.1 in 2008 to 2.2 in 2009, which "could be interpreted as a mildly positive response to the newly-adopted package of anti-corruption legislation initiated and promoted by president Medvedev and passed by the Duma in December of 2008", according to Transparency International's CPI 2009 Regional Highlights report.

On 10 March 2009, Medvedev signed the presidential decree to reform the civil service system between 2009 and 2013 as part of his drive against corruption. The main direction of reforms include establishing a new system to manage the civil service, introducing effective technology and modern methods of human resources operations, and increasing the efficiency and professionalism of civil servants.

On 13 April 2010, Medvedev signed presidential decree No. 460 which introduced the National Anti-Corruption Strategy, a midterm government policy, while the plan is updated every two years. The new strategy stipulated increased fines, greater public oversight of government budgets and sociological research. According to Georgy Satarov, president of the Indem think tank, the decree "probably reflected Medvedev's frustration with the fact that the 2008 plan had yielded little result."

In January 2011, President Medvedev admitted that the government had so far failed in its anti-corruption measures.

On 4 May 2011, Medvedev continued his anti-corruption efforts by signing the Federal Law On Amendments to the Criminal Code and the Code of Administrative Offences of the Russian Federation to Improve State Anti-Corruption Management. The bill raised fines for corruption to up to 100 time the amount of the bribe given or received, with the maximum fine being 500 million rubles ($18.3 million).

=== Economy ===
The onset of the 2008–2009 Russian financial crisis in September 2008 led to an economic decline. Dmitry Medvedev attributed the decline in the Russian stock market to the impact of the 2008 financial crisis and contended that the crisis in Russia had little if anything to do with internal problems in its economy and government policies. He ordered the injection of large funds from the state budget into the markets to stabilize the situation.

Medvedev launched the Medvedev modernisation programme, which aimed at modernising the economy of Russia and Russian society, decreasing the country's dependency on oil and gas revenues and creating a diversified economy based on high technology and innovation. The programme was based on the top 5 priorities for the country's technological development: efficient energy use; nuclear technology; information technology; medical technology and pharmaceuticals; and space technology in combination with telecommunications. For Medvedev, the modernisation programme became one of the most ambitious and important agendas of his presidency.

On 7 August 2009, Dmitry Medvedev instructed Prosecutor General Yury Chayka and Chief of the Audit Directorate of the Presidential Administration of Russia Konstantin Chuychenko to probe state corporations, a new highly privileged form of organizations earlier promoted by President Putin, to question their appropriateness. That same day, Medvedev also said that giant state corporations will inevitably be privatized, and although the state had increased its role in the economy in recent years, this should remain a temporary move.

In November 2010, on his annual speech to the Federal Assembly, Medvedev stressed for greater privatization of unneeded state assets both at the federal and regional level, and that Russia's regions must sell-off non-core assets to help fund post-crisis spending, following in the footsteps of the state's planned $32 billion 3-year asset sales. Medvedev said the money from privatisation should be used to help modernise the economy and the regions should be rewarded for finding their own sources of cash.

=== Election reform ===
In his first address to the Russian parliament on 5 November 2008, Medvedev proposed to change the Constitution of Russia in order to increase the terms of the President and State Duma from four to six and five years respectively (see 2008 Amendments to the Constitution of Russia).

Medvedev proposed to the legislature on 8 May 2009 and on 2 June signed into law an amendment whereby the chairperson of the Constitutional Court and his deputies would be proposed to the parliament by the president rather than elected by the judges, as was the case before.

In 2009, Medvedev proposed an amendment to the election law which would decrease the State Duma election threshold from 7% to 5%. The amendment was signed into law in Spring 2009. Parties receiving more than 5% but less than 6% of the votes will now be guaranteed one seat, while parties receiving more than 6% but less than 7% will get two seats. These seats will be allocated before the seats for parties with over 7% support.

The Russian election law stipulates that parties with representatives in the State Duma (at the time United Russia, Communist Party of the Russian Federation, Liberal Democratic Party of Russia and A Just Russia) are free to put forward a list of candidates for the Duma elections, while parties with no current representation need first to collect signatures. Under the 2009 amendments initiated by Medvedev, the number of signatures required was lowered from 200,000 to 150,000 for the 2011 Duma elections. In subsequent elections, only 120,000 signatures will be required.

In September 2009, Medvedev said he approved of the 2004 abolition of direct popular elections of regional leaders, effectively in favor of their appointment by the Kremlin, and added that he didn't see a possibility of a return to direct elections even in 100 years. In August 2009, Medvedev promised to break the near-monopoly of ruling party United Russia over the political system, stating that "New democratic times are beginning". On 11 October 2009, regional elections were won by United Russia with 66% of the vote. Medvedev stated that this proved the party's moral and legal right to run the regions. But according to Liliya Shibanova, head of independent poll watchdog GOLOS Association, "political competition is practically zero". Pro-Western opposition parties claimed the playing fields were uneven. On 26 October 2009, the First Deputy Chief of Staff Vladislav Surkov, warned that democratic experiments could result in more instability and that more instability "could rip Russia apart". On 6 November 2010, Medvedev vetoed a recently passed bill which restricted antigovernment demonstrations. The bill, passed on 22 October, notably prohibited anyone who had previously been convicted of organizing an illegal mass rally from seeking permission to stage a demonstration.

In late November 2010, Medvedev made a public statement about the damage being done to Russia's politics by the dominance of the United Russia party. He claimed that the country faced political stagnation if the ruling party would "degrade" if not challenged; "this stagnation is equally damaging to both the ruling party and the opposition forces." In the same speech, he said Russian democracy was "imperfect" but improving. BBC Russian correspondents reported that this came on the heels of discontent in political circles and opposition that the authorities, in their view, had too much control over the political process.

=== Police reform ===
Medvedev made reforming Russia's law enforcement one of his top agendas. Medvedev initiated the reform at the end of 2009, with a presidential decree issued on 24 December ordering the government to start planning the reform. In early August 2010 a draft law was posted on the Internet for public discussion. The website was popular, with more than 2,000 comments posted within 24 hours of its opening. Based on citizen feedback, several modifications to the draft were made. On 27 October 2010, President Medvedev submitted the draft to the lower house of the State Duma. The lower house of the Duma voted to approve the bill on 28 January 2011, and the upper house followed suit on 2 February. On 7 February, President Medvedev signed the bill into law. The changes came into effect on 1 March 2011.

Around 217 billion rubles ($7 billion) were allocated to the police reform from the federal budget for the time frame 2012–2013.

=== Education ===
President Medvedev initiated new policy called "Our New School" and instructed the government to present a review on the implementation of the initiative every year.

In May 2009, Medvedev set up the Presidential Commission of the Russian Federation to Counter Attempts to Falsify History to the Detriment of Russia's Interests.

=== Technology ===
Medvedev named technological innovation one of the key priorities of his presidency. In May 2009, Medvedev established the Presidential Commission on Innovation, which he would personally chair every month. The commission comprises almost the entire Russian government and some of the best minds from academia and business.

== Foreign policy ==
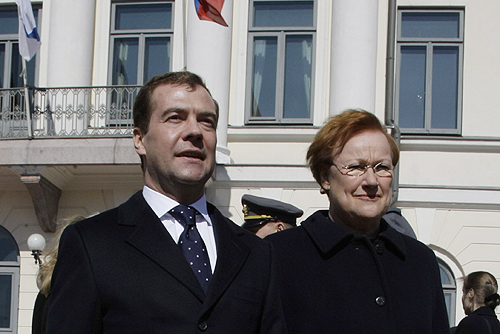
With Finnish President Tarja Halonen, 20 April 2009

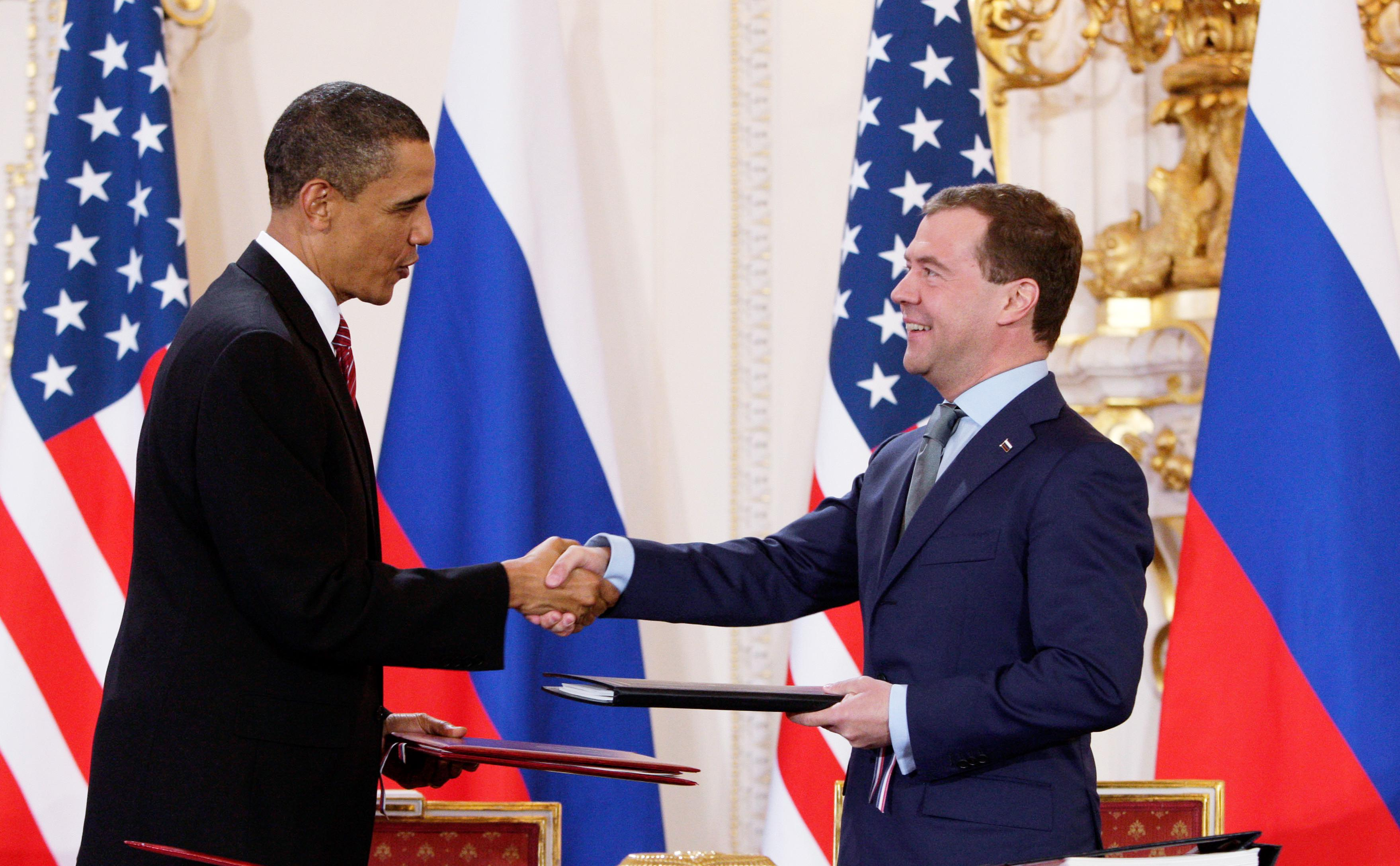
With U.S. President Barack Obama, 8 April 2010

=== 2008 South Ossetia war ===
The most serious foreign policy event during Medvedev's presidency was the 2008 South Ossetia war. Tensions between Georgia and Russian-supported separatist regions of Abkhazia and South Ossetia had been rising throughout the year 2008, with both sides accusing each other of preparing for a war. In the night of 7–8 August, Georgia launched a massive military attack against South Ossetia. 7 Russian peacekeepers stationed in the region were killed in the attack. The Georgian side said that the actions of Russian peacekeepers and Ossetians were provocative and they intended to make Georgia feel forced to start the military operation. On 8 August, Russia reacted by sending its military forces into South Ossetia and launching air strikes against Georgian military infrastructure. Russia and Abkhazia opened a second front by attacking the Kodori Gorge, held by Georgia. In five-days of fighting, the Georgian assault was repelled and its forces were expelled from both of the separatist regions The war drove tensions in Russia–United States relations to a post–Cold War high. On 26 August, following a unanimous vote of the Federal Assembly of Russia, Medvedev issued a presidential decree officially recognizing Abkhazia and South Ossetia as independent states, an action condemned by the G8.

=== Medvedev Doctrine ===
On 31 August 2008, Medvedev announced a shift in the Russian foreign policy under his government, built around five main principles, collectively known as the Medvedev Doctrine:

1. Fundamental principles of international law are supreme.
2. The world will be multipolar.
3. Russia will not seek confrontation with other nations.
4. Russia will protect its citizens wherever they are.
5. Russia will develop ties in friendly regions.

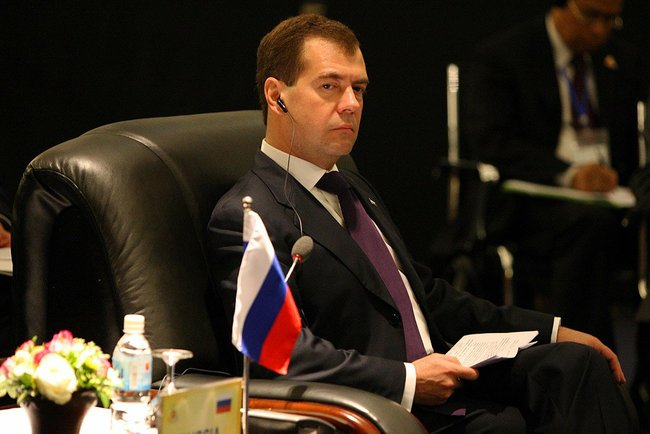
President Dmitry Medvedev at the 2nd ASEAN-Russia Summit in Hanoi, Vietnam, 30 October 2010

In his address to the parliament on 5 November 2008 he also promised to deploy the Iskander missile system and radar-jamming facilities in Kaliningrad Oblast to counter the U. S. missile defence system in Eastern Europe. Following U.S. President Barack Obama's announcement on 17 September 2009, that Washington would not deploy missile-defense elements in the Czech Republic and Poland, Dmitry Medvedev said he decided against deploying Iskander missiles in Russia's Kaliningrad Oblast.

In August 2009, Medvedev published an open letter blaming Ukraine's president Viktor Yushchenko for "the anti-Russian position of the current Ukrainian authorities", (Note: In the videoblog, Dmitry Medvedev accused Viktor Yushchenko of arming the Georgian military with Ukrainian weapons which were used in the war in South Ossetia in August 2008. Among other issues in the relationship, such as the Black Sea Fleet, gas disputes, Medvedev also accused Yushchenko of attempting to eliminate the Russian language from everyday life in Ukraine. Medvedev also accused the Yushchenko administration of being willing to engage in historical revisionism and heroisation of Nazi collaborators, and imposing on the international community "a nationalistic interpretation of the mass famine of 1932–1933 in the USSR, calling it the "genocide of the Ukrainian people".) which analysts said was timed to influence the 2010 Ukrainian presidential election. It elicited a response, (Note: In the letter Ukrainian President Yushchenko called Ukraine's position on the 2008 events in Georgia coincident with "the known positions of virtually all other countries" with "an exceptional respect for the sovereignty, territorial integrity and inviolability of borders of Georgia or any other sovereign states", called arms trade with Georgia legal since Georgia has not been and now is not a subject of any international sanctions or embargo, objected to Russian criticism about Ukraine joining NATO (emphasizing that the desire of Ukraine to membership in NATO was in no way directed against Russia and the final decision on accession to NATO will be held only after a national referendum), accused the Black Sea Fleet of "gross violations of bilateral agreements and the legislation of Ukraine", accused Russia of trying "to deprive Ukraine of its view of its own history" and accused Russia that not Ukraine but Russia itself is "virtually unable to realize the right to meet their national and cultural needs" of the Ukrainian minority in Russia.) and would later influence the pro-Russian policies of president Viktor Yanukovych.

== 2012 presidential election ==
On 24 September 2011, during the United Russia party congress, Medvedev recommended Vladimir Putin as the party's presidential candidate for the presidential election the following year and revealed that the two men had already made a deal that would allow Putin to run for president in 2012, being ineligible to do so in 2008 because of term limits. Medvedev added that he himself wanted to remain in government in some other capacity. Putin accepted Medvedev's offer the same day, and endorsed him for the position of the prime minister of Russia should United Russia, who were being led by Medvedev, win in the upcoming legislative election.

Putin won the election on 4 March 2012, and was inaugurated on 7 May, as Medvedev's presidency ended and he was appointed prime minister.

== See also ==
- Presidency of Vladimir Putin
- List of international presidential trips made by Dmitry Medvedev

== Notes ==
Russian presidential administrations
Preceded by Vladimir Putin	Medvedev Presidency; 2008–2012	Succeeded by Vladimir Putin
