= Electoral history of Sergey Mironov =

List of elections featuring Sergey Mironov as a candidate

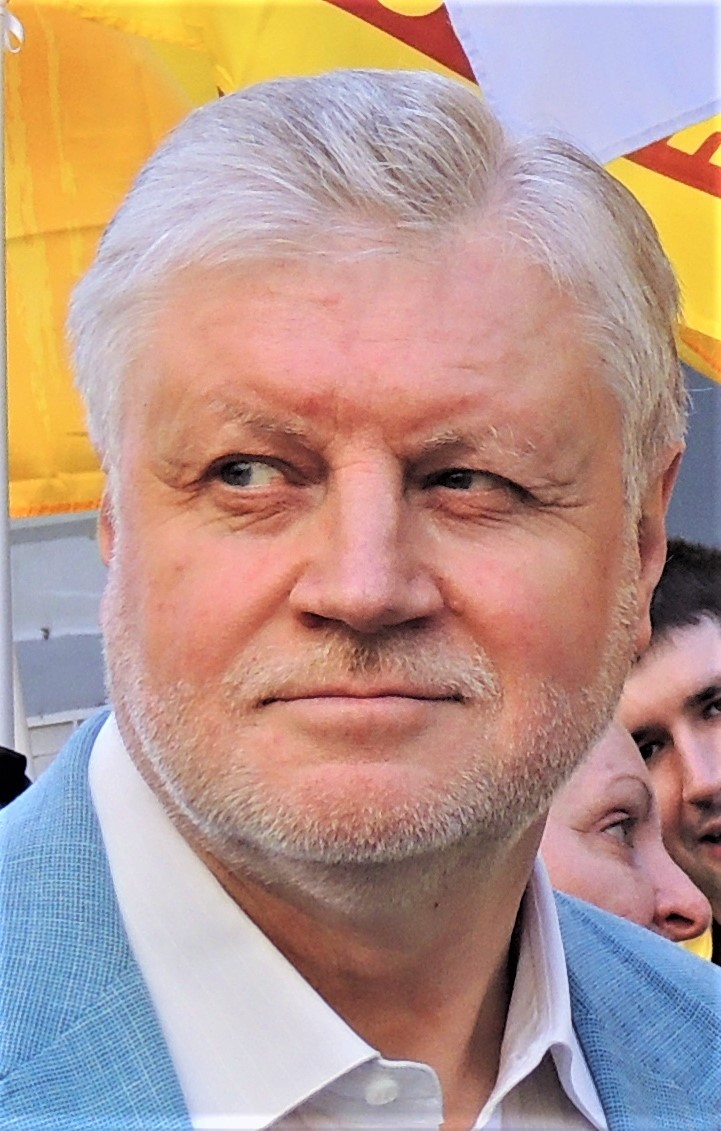
Sergey Mironov

Electoral history of Sergey Mironov, Member of the State Duma, former Senator from Saint Petersburg and 3rd Chairman of the Federation Council.

== 1998 Saint Petersburg Legislative Assembly election ==
12 constituency
Nominee	Result	
Sergey M. Mironov	21,815	69.33%
Dmitry Zapolsky	4,128	13.12%
Andrey Golubkov	1,538	4.89%
Sergey V. Mironov	539	1.71%
Sergey Nirov	536	1.70%
Alexey Mironov	270	0.86%
Sergey Malekhin	145	0.46%
Against all	2,494	7.93%

== Chairman of the Federation Council elections ==
=== 2001 ===
Unopposed
For		Against		Abstaining		No voting	
151	84.8%	0	0.0%	0	0.0%	27	15.2%

=== 2003 ===
Unopposed
For		Against		Abstaining		No voting	
159	89.3%	0	0.0%	2	1.1%	17	9.6%

=== 2007 ===
Unopposed
For		Against		Abstaining		No voting	
156	90.7%	0	0.0%	1	0.6%	15	8.7%

== 2011 Chairman of the State Duma election ==
Candidate	Votes	%
√ Sergey Naryshkin (UR)	238	52.9%
Ivan Melnikov (CPRF)	208	46.2%
Vladimir Zhirinovsky (LDPR)	204	45.3%
Sergey Mironov (JR)	203	45.1%

== Presidential elections ==
=== 2004 ===
2004 presidential election
Candidate	Party	Votes	%
Vladimir Putin	Independent	49,558,328	71.9
Nikolay Kharitonov	Communist Party	9,514,554	13.8
Sergey Glazyev	Independent	2,850,610	4.1
Irina Khakamada	Independent	2,672,189	3.9
Oleg Malyshkin	Liberal Democratic Party	1,405,326	2.0
Sergey Mironov	Russian Party of Life	524,332	0.8
Against all		2,397,140	3.5

=== 2012 ===
2012 presidential election
Candidates	Party	Votes	%
Vladimir Putin	United Russia	45,602,075	63.60
Gennady Zyuganov	Communist Party	12,318,353	17.18
Mikhail Prokhorov	Independent	5,722,508	7.98
Vladimir Zhirinovsky	Liberal Democratic Party	4,458,103	6.22
Sergey Mironov	A Just Russia	2,763,935	3.85
