= Nikolai Levichev =

Russian politician

- Николай Левичев
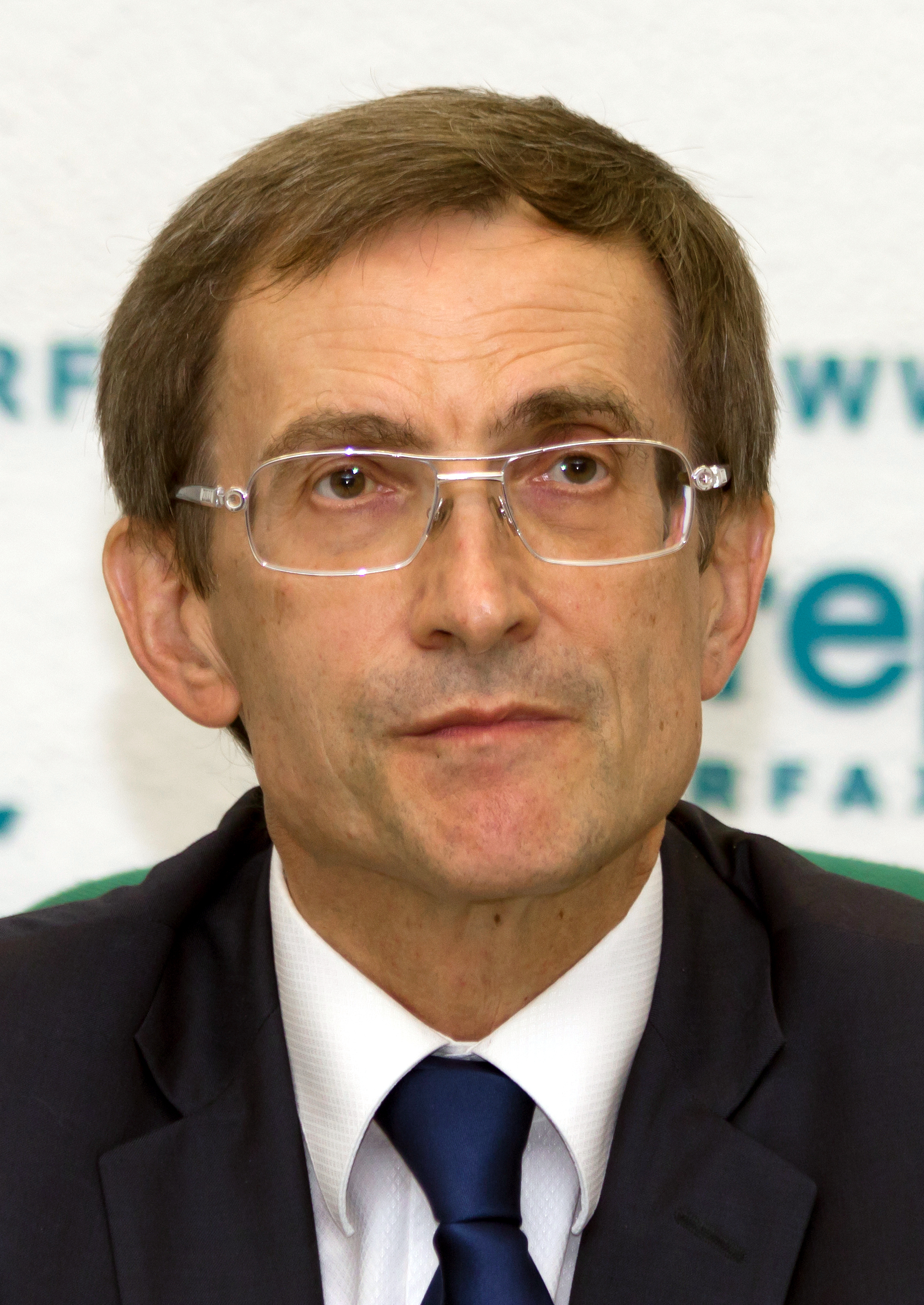
- Levichev in 2013

Leader of the Fair Russia Party
- In office April 16, 2011 – October 27, 2013
- Preceded by: Sergey Mironov
- Succeeded by: Sergey Mironov

Personal details
- Born: May 28, 1953 (age 73) Pushkin, Leningrad, Russian SFSR, Soviet Union
- Party: A Just Russia
- Spouse: Valentina Levicheva
- Education: Andrei Zhdanov Leningrad State University
- Website: www.levichev.info

Nikolai Levichev's voice
recorded July 2013

Nikolai Vladimirovich Levichev (Russian: Николай Владимирович Левичев; born May 28, 1953) is a Russian politician who served as leader of the centre‑left party A Just Russia. He serves as a deputy in the State Duma, and since February 2016 has been a member of the Central Election Commission of Russia.

== Early life and education ==
Levichev was born on 28 May 1953 in Pushkin, Leningrad Oblast, then part of the Soviet Union. His father was a professor of radio engineering in the military school, the author of several textbooks for students. His mother, a mathematician by training, worked as a graphic artist at the publishing house Science. His grandfather was a scholar, graduated from Department of Biology University of St. Petersburg, an honorary citizen of St. Petersburg. He graduated from eighth grade in 410 high school Pushkin, where he studied in the same class with Sergei Mironov, with whom he lived in a doorway. He won in math competitions. 9-10th grade he was in physical and mathematical school No. 239 of Leningrad (one of the top three special schools in the city), where he graduated in 1970.

He graduated from Leningrad State University with a degree in physics and initially worked in science-related government institutions before moving into politics. He studied at the same course with Vladimir Churov (since 2007 - Chairman of the CEC ).

In 1991, he worked in the Trade Unions. He graduated from the Academy of Social Sciences (AON) at the CPSU Central Committee, and in 1991, took postgraduate studies at the Academy of Social Sciences. He was in the Communist Party until its ban in August 1991. He graduated from the Academy of Civil Service. In 1991, he founded Ltd. Company The-C, then from 1991 to 2002 he was the general director of publishing house Publishing House The-C.

== Entrepreneurship ==
In April 1999, together with Alexander Podlesovym and the corporationsSociety NOYP, JSC STRONEK and JSC Quive established Investment Company (IC) AyBiEych» (IBH), which became the CEO of A. undergrowth.

== Political career ==
Levichev became politically active in the 2000s. He was a founding member of A Just Russia, established in 2006 with tacit Kremlin support as part of a "managed democracy" framework to simulate opposition. In April 2011, he succeeded Sergey Mironov as party leader. Under his leadership, the party maintained an ambiguous stance: officially social democratic but broadly supportive of President Vladimir Putin. Levichev stepped down in 2013, and Mironov resumed the chairmanship. Levichev, however, continued to serve as a deputy in the State Duma.

=== Work in the Central Election Commission of Russia ===
On 24 February 2016, Levichev was appointed to the Central Election Commission of the Russian Federation. His appointment was seen by observers as part of a broader effort by the Kremlin to maintain control over the electoral process while projecting institutional legitimacy. His role followed the tenure of Vladimir Churov, a figure heavily criticized for enabling electoral manipulation, although Levichev’s own term was viewed as less confrontational but similarly state-aligned.

== Political views ==
Levichev has expressed support for state-led economic and social policies and emphasized national sovereignty.

== Sanctions ==
Due to his parliamentary support for Russia’s annexation of Ukrainian territory, Levichev was designated by the European Union on 4 June 2022 under Council Regulation (EU) 2022/1270, which imposed an asset freeze and travel ban. The EU expanded its measures on 20 October 2022 (Regulation (EU) 2022/1905) after the further annexations of Donetsk, Luhansk, Kherson, and Zaporizhzhia.

In January 2023, Japan imposed sanctions on Nikolai Levichev.

The United Kingdom included him on its Russia sanctions list in March 2023.
