= A Just Russia =

Political party in Russia

Socialist Political Party "A Just Russia" Социалистическая политическая партия «Справедливая Россия»
- Abbreviation: SR
- Chairman: Sergey Mironov
- First Deputy Chairman: Alexander Babakov
- Deputy Chairmen: Zakhar Prilepin; Ruslan Tatarinov
- State Duma faction leader: Sergey Mironov
- Founders: Sergey Mironov; Alexander Babakov; Igor Zotov
- Founded: 28 October 2006; 19 years ago
- Merger of: Rodina (2006–2012); Russian Pensioners' Party (2006–2012); Russian Party of Life (2006)
- Headquarters: Moscow, Russia
- Membership (2012): 400,000 (claimed)
- Ideology: Democratic socialism; Social democracy; Social conservatism; Left-wing nationalism; Eurasianism
- Political position: Centre-left
- National affiliation: All-Russia People's Front; National Patriotic Forces of Russia
- Continental affiliation: Forum of Socialists of the CIS Countries
- International affiliation: Socialist International (2008–2022); Sovintern (since 2026)
- Colours: Yellow; Red
- Federation Council: 1 / 178
- State Duma: 28 / 450
- Governors: 1 / 85
- Regional parliaments: 226 / 3,983
- Ministers: 0 / 31

Website
- spravedlivo.ru
- Politics of Russia; Political parties; Elections; A: Also been described as centrist, and left-wing.

A Just Russia (Russian: Справедливая Россия, romanized: Spravedlivaya Rossiya; abbr. SR (Note: Full party name: Socialist Political Party "A Just Russia"; Russian: Социалистическая политическая партия «Справедливая Россия», romanized: Socialisticheskaya politicheskaya partiya "Spravedlivaya Rossiya", IPA: [sətsɨəlʲɪˈsʲtʲitɕɪskəjə pəlʲɪˈtʲitɕɪskəjə ˈpartʲɪjə sprəvʲɪdˈlʲivəjə rɐˈsʲijə (ˌɛsˌɛr)])) is a socially conservative and left-wing nationalist political party in Russia which considers itself "democratic socialist" and social-democratic. The party is considered to be part of the "systemic opposition" and is generally sympathetic to the agenda of incumbent president Vladimir Putin, including his foreign policy.

The party was formed on 28 October 2006 as a merger of the left-wing factions of Rodina, the Russian Party of Life and the Russian Pensioners' Party. Later, six further minor parties joined. It then called for a "New Socialism of the 21st Century" which guarantees the rights and freedoms of the individual and ensures the proper functioning of a welfare state. In 2011, Nikolai Levichev was elected as party chairman, succeeding Sergey Mironov who led the party between 2006 and 2011. On 27 October 2013, Mironov was re-elected as party chairman, and again on 28 October 2018. On 28 January 2021, the party merged with the For Truth and Patriots of Russia parties.

== History ==
=== Name ===
- 28 October 2006 – 25 June 2009: A Just Russia: Motherland/Pensioners/Life (Справедливая Россия: Родина/Пенсионеры/Жизнь)
- 25 June 2009 – 22 February 2021: A Just Russia (Справедливая Россия)
- 22 February 2021 – 25 October 2025: Socialist Political Party "A Just Russia – Patriots – For Truth" (Социалистическая политическая партия «Справедливая Россия – Патриоты – За правду»)
- since 25 October 2025: Socialist Political Party "A Just Russia" (Социалистическая политическая партия «Справедливая Россия»)

=== Establishment ===
On 26 March 2006, the deputy head of the presidential administration, Vladislav Surkov, met with Sergey Mironov, then the party leader of the Russian Party of Life, and 30 deputies from the party, where Surkov formulated the idea of building a two-party system in the country, in which the Kremlin could rely on one of two parties, the other being the ruling party, United Russia. Surkov stated: "Society has no 'second leg' to step on when the first one is numb. In Russia, a second large party is needed". Surkov suggested that the role of the "main leg" would be left to United Russia for the near future. In the meeting, Surkov also noted that in the 2003 legislative elections, United Russia received about 37% of the vote, which was about the same as the next three parties, the Communist Party, the Liberal Democratic Party, and Rodina, and said that ideally, the "second leg" should have the same level of electoral support as the three parties. According to researcher Luke March, a second party of power would incentivize United Russia to perform well, or strong performance for A Just Russia would have "Putin's influence spread all over the political field", quoting political commentator Sergei Markov.

A Just Russia formed on 28 October 2006 as a merger of three parties, namely Rodina, the Russian Party of Life and the Russian Pensioners' Party. Of these, the nationalist Rodina was the largest, having won 9% of the popular vote in the 2003 Duma elections. At the time of the merger, Rodina had 37 seats in the Duma. The Party of Pensioners had gained 3% of the vote, failing to cross the 5% election threshold and also been weakened by infighting in its leadership. The social-democratic Party of Life led by Sergey Mironov was still relatively young and had won only one regional election.

As the only party of the three with seats in the Duma, Rodina dominated the unification process. In simultaneous conventions held in Moscow on 26 August 2006, the Party of Life and the Party of Pensioners decided to join Rodina. Two months later on 28 October 2006, the new party held its founding congress which decided to change the party's name to A Just Russia. Mironov was elected the unified party's chairman while Rodina's former chairman Alexander Babakov became the secretary of the central council presidium and the leader of the Party of Pensioners Igor Zotov became secretary of the political council. The next year, A Just Russia expanded further, absorbing three additional small parties in 2007, namely the People's Party, the Party of Entrepreneurship Development and the Party of Constitutional Democrats.

Former logo of the party until 2011

At the party's founding convention, chairman Sergey Mironov expressed support for the direction given to the country by President Vladimir Putin, claiming that "we will not allow anyone to veer from it after Putin leaves his post in 2008". At the same time, he harshly criticised Putin's party United Russia and what Mironov called the largest party's "monopoly" of the nation's political, economic and administrative resources. Mironov characterised A Just Russia as a new "leftist political force" and a "hard opposition", saying that "if United Russia is the party of power, we will become the party of the people".

The members of the political party Spravedlivaya Rossiya (A Just Russia) are people who have united in order to strengthen the Russian state in the interests of the people, and to create a just and equitable society in Russia. Such a society, which honours traditions, is proud of its history, and respects the elder generation, is constantly evolving and looks to the future with confidence.

— From the party manifesto published in the founding congress of 28 August 2006

=== First election successes ===
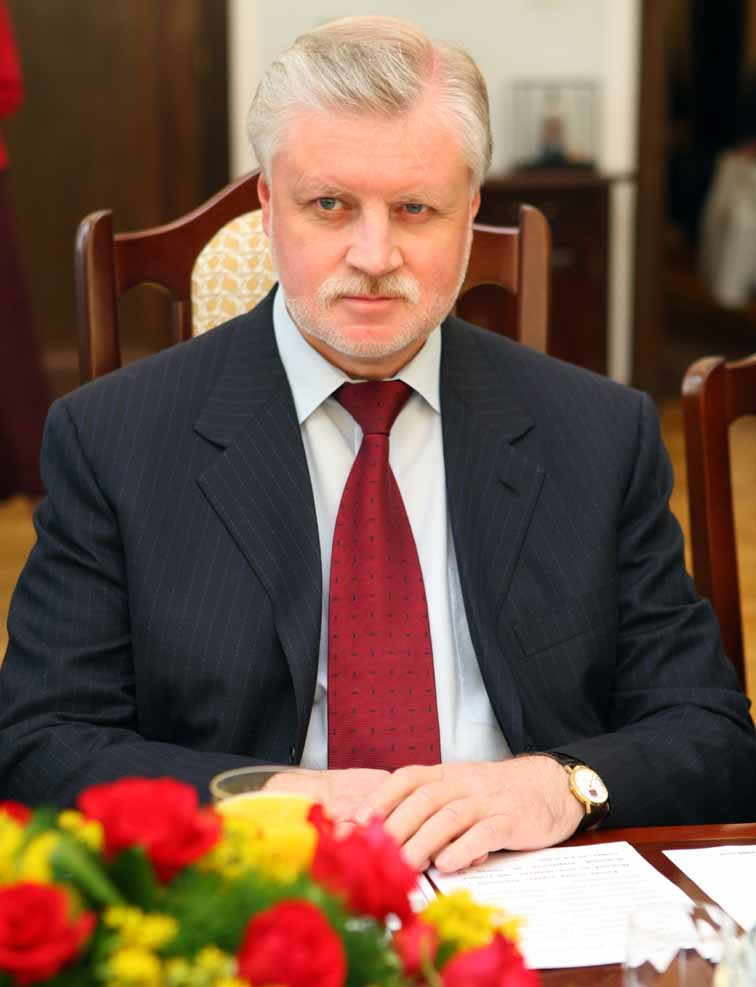
Sergey Mironov served as the party's chairman in 2006–2011 while also holding the position of the Federation Council chairman.

Shortly after its creation, A Just Russia participated in its first elections when the party's candidate Viktor Tarkhov won the mayoral race in Samara. The March 2007 regional elections were dominated by United Russia, but A Just Russia also put up a strong performance. In particular, the new party won a majority in the regional parliament in Stavropol Krai.

The emergence of A Just Russia changed Russia's political landscape and demonstrated that the country's leadership had been split between two parties. United Russia supporters in the presidential administration grew wary of the challenge posed by A Just Russia, worrying that United Russia would lose its position as "the president's party". Before the 2007 Duma elections, the Kremlin had withdrawn its support of A Just Russia and threw its weight entirely behind United Russia.

In a press conference on 19 January 2007 dedicated to upcoming Duma elections, Secretary of the Central Party Council of A Just Russia Alexander Babakov announced that the party had approximately 300,000 members.

In May 2007, A Just Russia's chairman Sergey Mironov proposed a merger between his party and the Communist Party of the Russian Federation in order to create a new unified socialist party.

=== 2007 Duma elections ===
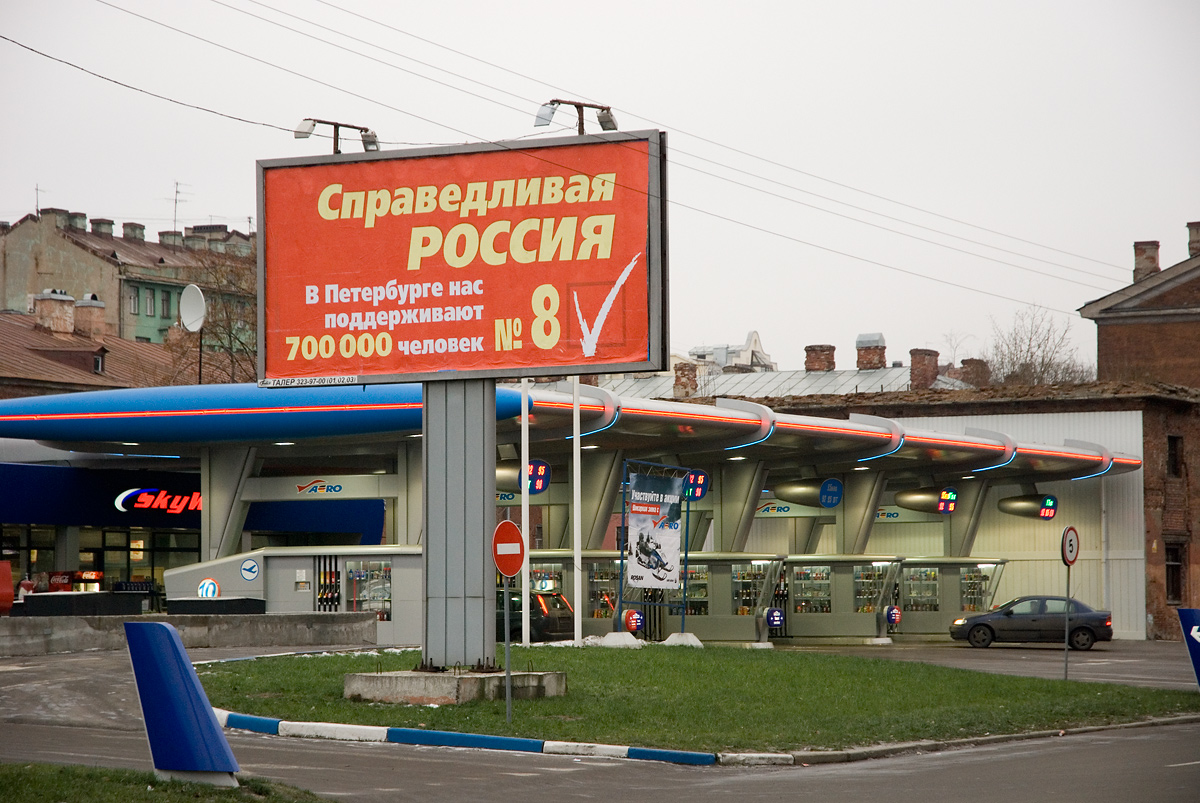
A Just Russia election poster in Saint Petersburg in November 2007, one month before the Duma elections in which the party received 16% of the votes from the city

In the run-up to the December 2007 Duma elections, President Vladimir Putin – the country's most popular politician – explicitly and unequivocally endorsed the United Russia party and decided to head its national list. Putin's decision significantly changed the election campaign and resulted in a massive boost to United Russia's popularity. This represented a harsh blow to A Just Russia which also had hoped to ride on Putin's popularity. Polls suggested the party could have difficulties crossing the 7% election threshold.

A Just Russia appointed three persons to its national list, namely chairman Sergey Mironov; Svetlana Goryacheva (a former member of the Communist Party of the Russian Federation); and Sergey Shargunov, a 27-year-old fiction author. In its regional lists, A Just Russia had 553 candidates, taking its total number of candidates to 556. This was more than the Communists (515), but less than United Russia (600). Although originally positioned as a centre-left party, under Mironov's leadership A Just Russia campaigned as a socialist alternative to the Communists.

In the end, A Just Russia received 5,383,639 votes (7.74%), becoming the fourth party to cross the 7% election threshold and enter the Duma after United Russia, the Communists and the Liberal Democratic Party of Russia. As a result, A Just Russia got 38 of the 450 seats (8.4%) in the Duma. The party received its highest share of votes in Astrakhan (20%), Saint Petersburg (16%) and Stavropol (13%). In Saint Petersburg, the hometown of chairman Mironov, A Just Russia became the second largest party. Mironov said he would not take up his seat in the Duma himself, but instead continue as the Chairman of the Federation Council. A Just Russia's performance in the elections was a slight disappointment, especially since one of its predecessor parties, Rodina, had won 9% of the votes in the 2003 elections.

==== Post-election ====
On 10 December 2007, A Just Russia was part of a coalition of parties which nominated Dmitry Medvedev as their candidate for the 2008 presidential elections.

On 25 April 2008, A Just Russia held its third annual congress, where the party expelled thousands of members who were not aware that they were members. The party's charter was amended at the congress to make mergers easier. The congress also disbanded the party's politburo and transferred its functions to the Central Council. Politburo's chairman Nikolai Levichev, who also heads A Just Russia's faction in the State Duma, was elected as the council's first secretary.

During its XXIII Congress On 30 June 2008, A Just Russia was accepted into the Socialist International, the worldwide organisation of social-democratic political parties.

The United Socialist Party of Russia and the Russian Ecological Party "The Greens" merged into the party in 2008.

In the 2007–2011 State Duma, A Just Russia became a strong supporter of the Medvedev modernisation programme, endorsing President Dmitry Medvedev's view that Russia must move towards a diversified post-industrial economy and democratisation of its political system. A Just Russia also advocated restoration of direct gubernatorial elections and lowering the Duma election threshold from 7% to 3%. A Just Russia voted against Prime Minister Vladimir Putin's anti-crisis plan in April 2009 and also voted against the governments budgets in 2010 and 2011. According to researcher Luke March, in the 2007–2011 Duma A Just Russia clearly moved towards Medvedev. The party has declared absolute opposition to Putin's government while remaining supportive of Medvedev.

On 2 February 2010, Mironov told talk show host Vladimir Pozner Jr. that "to say that we support Vladimir Putin in everything and personally is already outdated information", noting that the party "categorically opposed" Putin's budget. A scandal broke out with the ruling party, leading to A Just Russia and United Russia to sign a political agreement to jointly support Putin and Medvedev on certain strategic issues and agreeing to discuss disagreements between them. However, A Just Russia withdrew from the agreement a month later, with Mironov accusing United Russia of violating the agreement.

In March 2011, Mironov stated that the party would not support United Russia's candidate for the next presidential election, and that it would decide on its nomination later in the autumn. At the party congress on 16 April 2011, Nikolai Levichev was elected party leader after Mironov was removed from the position. In May 2011, Mironov was removed from his position of Chairman of the Federation Council.

In August 2011, the party published its manifesto, announcing its transition to full opposition to the authorities.

=== 2011 Duma elections ===
In the 2011 legislative elections, the party received 13% of the vote, extending its number of seats to 64.

Following reports of electoral fraud at the election, party members joined in post-election protests against the results. Gennady Gudkov, a party heavyweight and deputy, was prominent at the demonstrations. Senior party members took part in demonstrations at Bolotnaya Square on 10 December, among them Gudkov and Oksana Dmitriyeva.

=== 2012 presidential election ===
Mironov was nominated as the party's candidate for the 2012 presidential election. Mironov stated that he would "enter the race not to participate, but to win", and also promised to nominate Oksana Dmitriyeva as prime minister if elected. Mironov called for a return to a socialist model of government. While he stated that he predicted a Putin victory, he declared that he would support Gennady Zyuganov in a hypothetical runoff against Putin. According to election results, Mironov came in last place, with 3.85% of the vote.

==== Post-election ====
On 22 May 2012, during a State Duma session where a bill was being considered to increase fines for those who violated protest laws, Mironov wore a white ribbon, a symbol that was being used by the anti-Kremlin opposition in protests against Putin's re-election, and the party remained silent in the discussion of the bill as a sign of protest. Mironov stated that the party "fundamentally disagrees with the content of the bill".

On 27 October 2012, Mironov called on members to stop wearing the white ribbon, the day after a United Russia deputy, Aleksandr Sidyakin, branded deputies who wore it as "traitors" and stomped on a white ribbon. Mironov urged members to distance themselves from the opposition, claiming that the rallies turned into a "political sect". He also threatened to expel Ilya Ponomaryov and Gudkov from the party for joining the opposition's Coordination Council. Ponomaryov and Gudkov were also among the deputies who were branded as traitors by Sidyakin. From 2012, members of the party who actively took part in protests left or were expelled from the party, including Gudkov and Ponomaryov. Dmitriyeva also distanced herself from the party.

In October 2013, Mironov was elected as party leader and in 2014, A Just Russia, along with United Russia, the Communist Party, and the Liberal Democratic Party, supported Putin's foreign policy following the Annexation of Crimea, and much of his domestic policy.

=== 2016 Duma elections ===
In the 2016 legislative elections, A Just Russia received 6% of the vote, losing most of its seats and retaining only 23 seats.

=== 2018 presidential election ===
In December 2017, Mironov outlined the party's new tasks, choosing not to participate in the 2018 presidential election due to his unwillingness to fight "for second place". Instead, the party would endorse Putin and work to limit the influence of United Russia on the agenda of Putin. Mironov stated that A Just Russia was, is, and will be in opposition to United Russia, but that it could not be "in opposition to Russia herself". Mironov also proposed "to honestly tell voters" that there was no "worthy alternative" to Putin. RBC reported that, according to sources close to the party's leadership, Mironov's unwillingness to participate in the election was due to fatigue and financial difficulties.

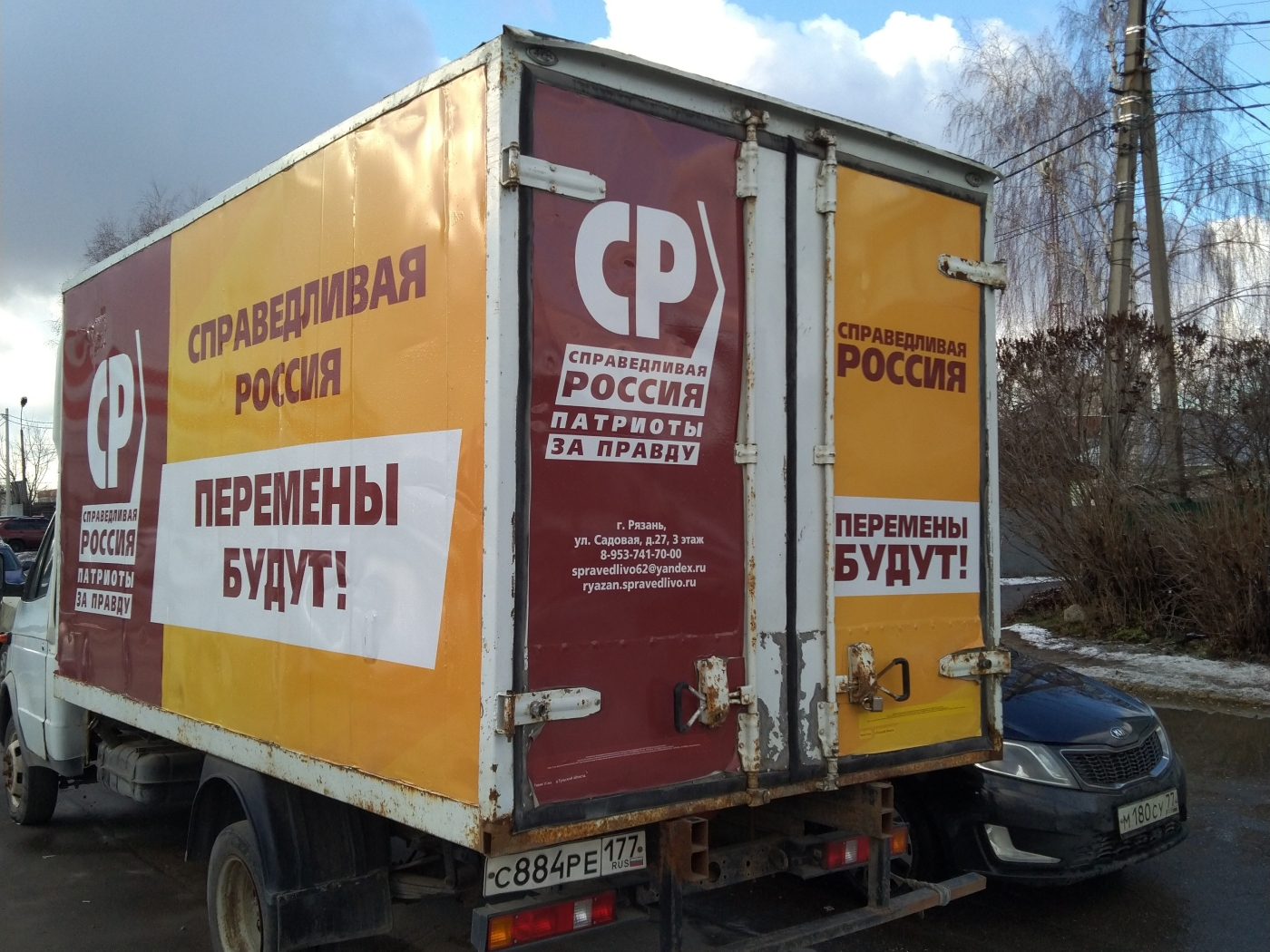
A van advertising the Just Russia political party, Ryazan. The sides read: "There will be changes!"

=== 2021 Duma elections ===
Logo of the A Just Russia – Patriots – For Truth party (2021–2025)

Ahead of the 2021 legislative elections, A Just Russia merged with the parties Patriots of Russia and For Truth in January 2021, forming A Just Russia – Patriots – For Truth. Mironov remained party leader, and according to their unification manifesto, the party would run on "12 principles of truth, patriotism and justice", including "strengthening the role of the state in the economy, developing a progressive taxation scale, toughening punishments for corruption, increasing the minimum wage, pensions and social benefits, phasing out of the high school state exams and budget decentralization". The party also reportedly planned to come in second place in the election, after United Russia, but eventually came third, after United Russia and the Communist Party of the Russian Federation.

==== Post-election ====
In February 2022, the party voted in favour of the recognition of the Donetsk People's Republic and the Luhansk People's Republic by the Russian Federation and later it supported the 2022 Russian invasion of Ukraine. As a result of these announcements, A Just Russia – For Truth was expelled from the Socialist International in March 2022.

In July 2022, the leader of the Communist Party of the Russian Federation, Gennady Zyuganov proposed a merging with A Just Russia – For Truth, but only if that party adopted the Communist programme. The day before, the leader of the A Just Russia Sergey Mironov said that he "does not see any obstacles to the creation in Russia of a large coalition of left-wing patriotic forces".

At its annual congress on 25 October 2025, A Just Russia – For Truth reverted to its pre-2021 name, A Just Russia. One of the reasons for the return was the de facto retreat of the former leaders of Patriots of Russia and For Truth from the party's leadership in recent years: Gennady Semigin resigned in 2024, and Zakhar Prilepin barely participated in the party leadership. Furthermore, Mironov stated that the acronym SRPZP offended him, "while everyone knows A Just Russia." The position of co-chairs, created in 2021 for Semigin and Prilepin, was abolished, as well as Semigin's and Prilepin's positions of Chairman of the Central Council and Secretary of the Chamber of Deputies. In their place, the positions of first deputy chairman of the party were created, with Alexander Babakov appointed, and two ordinary deputy chairmen, with Ruslan Tatarinov and Zakhar Prilepin appointed. Sergei Mironov was unanimously re-elected chairman.

== Membership ==
In 2012, the party claimed to have 400,000 members and claimed to be the largest left-wing party in Russia. It has regional branches in all federal subjects of Russia.

== Ideology and platform ==
A Just Russia calls for the creation of a welfare state with less economic inequality, but protecting individual property rights and maintaining a market economy. Under the leadership of Sergey Mironov, the party has presented itself as a socialist alternative to the Communist Party of the Russian Federation, and describes its ideology as "New Socialism of the 21st century". In the party platform, this "New Socialism" is defined as the antithesis of "barbarous, oligarchic capitalism". It represents a more individualist or liberal socialism. It is described as social democratic and democratic socialist.

Improving the socio-economic position of the average Russian is the party's primary aim. The party advocates for strengthening the welfare state through expanded social support, improved access to public services, poverty reduction, and increased spending on employment programmes to be increased to 1% of GDP. In the State Duma, the party emphasises its role as "constructive opposition" that opposes high-level corruption and supports further democratisation of the political system. In the 2007–2011 Duma, A Just Russia declared absolute opposition to Prime Minister Vladimir Putin's government, voting against the government's budgets in 2010 and 2011 while remaining strongly supportive of President Dmitry Medvedev and his modernisation programme. Despite such positions, A Just Russia endorsed Putin in the 2018 Russian presidential election.

In Russia's international relations, A Just Russia proposes moving away from the Western sphere and strengthening relations between the former Soviet states. The party opposes so-called "western" ideas such as LGBT rights.

Two of its deputies, Gennady Nosovko and Dmitry Gorovtchov, have on multiple occasions, at least in 2014, 2015, if not in 2012 and 2018 and 2022, proposed a bill that would unfetter mercenaries, who would be able "to provide armed escort of ships; train security forces; assist with mine clearing, protection of officials and facilities; take part in alternative settlement of armed conflicts" and more besides according to the 2014 bill, which would put them under the supervision of the Federal Security Service.

== Chairmen ==
No.	Portrait	Chairmen	Took office	Left office					
1		Sergey Mironov (b. 1953)	28 October 2006	16 April 2011					
2		Nikolai Levichev (b. 1953)	16 April 2011	27 October 2013					
3		Sergey Mironov (b. 1953)	27 October 2013	Incumbent	Co–chairmen				
3		Sergey Mironov (b. 1953)	27 October 2013	Incumbent	No.	Portrait	Co–Chairman	Took office	Left office
3		Sergey Mironov (b. 1953)	27 October 2013	Incumbent	1		Zakhar Prilepin (b. 1975)	22 February 2021	25 October 2025
3		Sergey Mironov (b. 1953)	27 October 2013	Incumbent	2		Gennady Semigin (b. 1964)	22 February 2021	26 October 2024

== International cooperation ==
A Just Russia used to be a full member of the Socialist International, but on 7 March 2022 the party was expelled for its support of the Russian invasion of Ukraine.

It also maintains friendly relations with Latin American left-wing political parties. A Just Russia repeatedly sent greetings to annual meetings of São Paulo Forum.

== Electoral results ==
=== Presidential ===
Election	Candidate	First round		Second round		Result
Election	Candidate	Votes	%	Votes	%	Result
2008	Endorsed Dmitry Medvedev	52,530,712	70.3	—N/a		Won
2012	Sergey Mironov	2,763,935	3.9	—N/a		Lost
2018	Endorsed Vladimir Putin	56,430,712	76.7	—N/a		Won
2024	Endorsed Vladimir Putin	76,277,708	88.48	—N/a		Won

=== State Duma ===
Election	Leader	Votes	%	Seats	+/–	Rank	Government
2007	Sergey Mironov	5,383,639	7.74	38 / 450		4th	Support
2011	Nikolai Levichev	8,695,522	13.24	64 / 450	▲26	▲3rd	Opposition
2016	Sergey Mironov	3,275,053	6.22	23 / 450	▼41	▼4th	Opposition (2016–2020)
2016	Sergey Mironov	3,275,053	6.22	23 / 450	▼41	▼4th	Support (2020–2021)
2021	Sergey Mironov	4,201,715	7.46	27 / 450	▲4	4th	Support
2026	Sergey Mironov	3,589,806	5.42	17 / 450	▼10	▼5th	

== Mergers ==
The following parties have merged into A Just Russia. The dates in brackets show when the merger took place and when it ended.

- Patriots of Russia (January 2021)
- For Truth (January 2021)
- Party of Social Justice (September 2008)
- United Socialist Party of Russia (May 2007)
- People's Party of the Russian Federation (April 2007)
- Party of Entrepreneurship Development (2007)
- Party of Constitutional Democrats (2007)
- The Greens (June 2009 – February 2012; re-established as an independent party in 2012)
- Rodina (October 2006 – September 2012; re-established as an independent party in 2012)
- Russian Pensioners' Party (October 2006 – April 2012; re-established as an independent party in 2012)
- Russian Party of Life (October 2006)

== Literature ==
- Sakwa, Richard (2011). The Crisis of Russian Democracy: Dual State, Factionalism and the Medvedev Succession. Cambridge University Press. ISBN 978-0521145220.
- March, Luke (2009). "Managing Opposition in a Hybrid Regime: Just Russia and Parastatal Opposition" (PDF). Slavic Review. 68 (3): 504–527. doi:10.1017/S0037677900019707. hdl:20.500.11820/a87bce70-0ac3-46c3-b8d0-3cfcfdf76053. S2CID 152699982.
