= Sergey Mironov =

Russian politician (born 1953)

Sergey Mironov MP
- Сергей Миронов
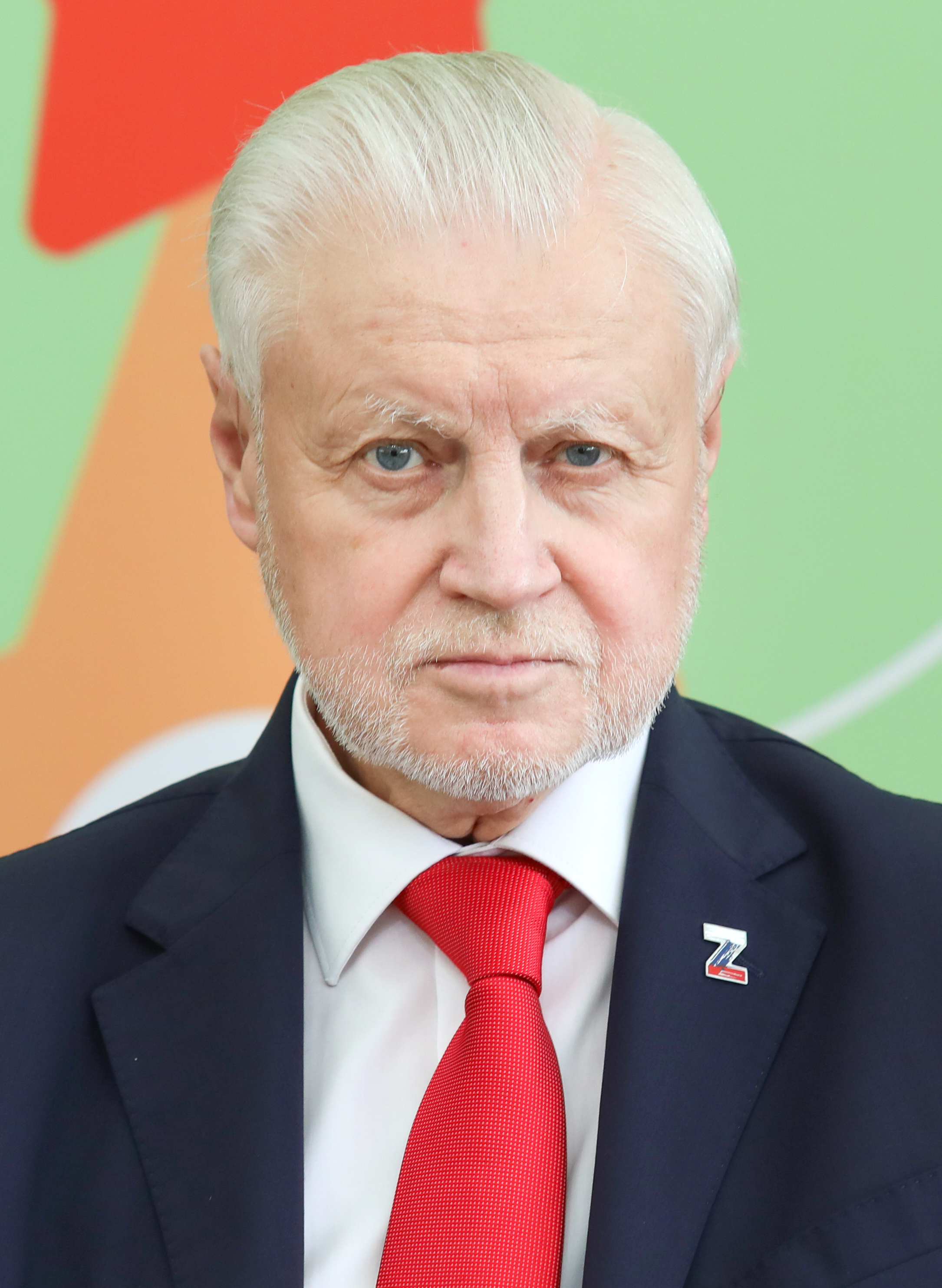
- Mironov in 2025

Parliamentary leader of A Just Russia in the State Duma
- Incumbent
- Assumed office 14 June 2011
- Preceded by: Nikolai Levichev

Member of the State Duma
- Incumbent
- Assumed office 14 June 2012
- Preceded by: Elena Vtorygina
- Constituency: Party-list (2012–present)

3rd Chairman of the Federation Council
- In office 5 December 2001 – 18 May 2011
- President: Vladimir Putin; Dmitry Medvedev
- Preceded by: Yegor Stroyev
- Succeeded by: Aleksander Torshin (acting); Valentina Matviyenko

Russian Federation Senator from Saint Petersburg
- In office 13 June 2001 – 18 May 2011
- Preceded by: Sergey Tarasov
- Succeeded by: Vadim Tyulpanov

Leader of A Just Russia
- Incumbent
- Assumed office 27 October 2013
- Preceded by: Nikolai Levichev
- In office 28 October 2006 – 16 April 2011
- Succeeded by: Nikolai Levichev

Personal details
- Born: 14 February 1953 (age 73) Pushkin, Russian SFSR, Soviet Union
- Party: A Just Russia (2006–present); Russian Party of Life (2002–2006)
- Spouses: Elena Danilova (m. 1977; div. 1984); Lyubov Ivanovna (m. 1984; div. 2003); Irina Yurievna (m. 2003; div. 2013); Olga Radievskaya (m. 2013; div. 2020); Inna Varlamova (m. 2022)
- Children: 4 (1 adopted)
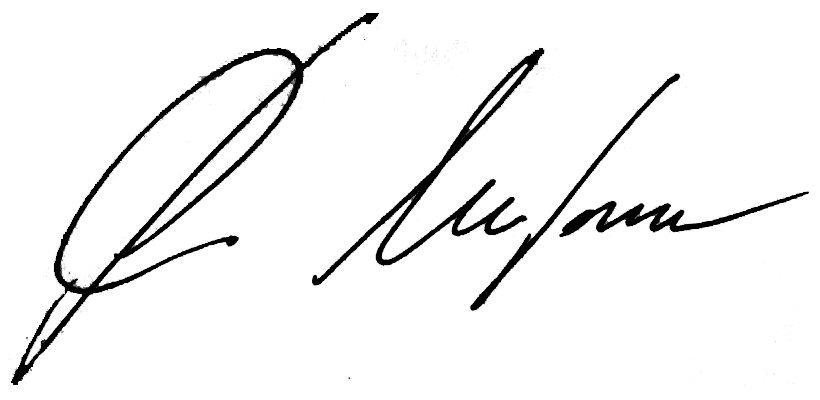
- Signature
- Website: www.mironov.ru
- Sergey Mironov's voice Recorded 12 May 2014

Sergey Mikhailovich Mironov (Russian: Сергей Михайлович Миронов; born 14 February 1953) is a Russian politician. He served as Chairman of the Federation Council, the upper house of the Russian parliament, from 2001 to 2011. He leads the faction A Just Russia in the State Duma.

== Life and career ==
In 1967 he joined the Komsomol.

In the 1970s, Mironov served in the airborne troops in the Soviet Army. In 1973 he was elected as deputy secretary committee of the Komsomol on ideological educational work at the Leningrad Mining Institute. After graduating from the Institute he worked as an engineer-geophysicist. After a brief time of working as an entrepreneur, he entered politics and, in 1994, was elected deputy of the Saint Petersburg Legislative Assembly. In June 2000, he was elected vice-chairman of the Saint Petersburg Legislative Assembly and, in 2001, entered the Federation Council of Russia as a representative of Saint Petersburg. In December 2001, Mironov was elected to be a Speaker of the Federation Council. Since February 2003, Mironov has been the Chairman of the Council of Inter-Parliamentary Assembly of States – members of the Commonwealth of Independent States and since April 2003 – Chairman of the Russian Party of Life. Sergey Mironov is from Saint Petersburg.

Mironov was a candidate in the 2004 presidential election. He was not considered to be a serious candidate and was quoted as saying: "We all want Vladimir Putin to be the next president." He polled less than one per cent of the vote.

In October 2006, he became the leader of the new left-wing opposition party A Just Russia (Справедливая Россия), which was formed by uniting Rodina, Mironov's Russian Party of Life, and the Russian Pensioners' Party. This effectively makes him the leader of the opposition as the three parties together would be stronger than the officially opposing Communist Party of the Russian Federation.

Mironov has proposed several times an amendment to the Russian constitution that would allow the President to be elected for 3 consecutive five or seven year terms. In 2007, Boris Gryzlov, leader of the rival United Russia party, said that changing the constitution would be unacceptable.

In the March 2012 presidential election, he received 3.86% of the votes.

During the 2022 Russian invasion of Ukraine, he referred to the Ukrainian government as a "Nazi regime" that "had to be destroyed".

In January 2023 he posted a photo of himself posing with a sledgehammer branded with Wagner Group logo atop an engraving of a pile of skulls. This sledgehammer was presented to him by the Wagner Group.

Russians critical of the 2022 Russian mobilization have used social media and other electronic means (e.g. Twitter) to enquire en masse Russia's top officials, who support war with Ukraine and mobilization, whether they themselves or their sons would go to the front. Most of them refused to answer or gave excuses, such as Mironov.

In late 2022, Russian opposition politician Nikita Yuferev accused Mironov of violating Russia's 2022 war censorship laws.

=== Sanctions ===
In March 2014, Mironov was included in list of Russian government sanctioned individuals because of their direct or alleged indirect involvement in the annexation of Crimea by the Russian Federation. On 25 July 2014, amidst the war in Donbas, the Ukrainian Interior Ministry launched criminal proceedings against Mironov for alleged financial support of pro-Russian armed groups.

Mironov was sanctioned by the United Kingdom government in 2014 in relation to the Russo-Ukrainian War, as well as by Canada under the Special Economic Measures Act (S.C. 1992, c. 17) in relation to the Russian invasion of Ukraine for Grave Breach of International Peace and Security.

== Political positions ==
Mironov opposes the legalization of short-barreled firearms in Russia, but, at the moment, admits the presence of such weapons in those who have served in the country's armed forces to have such weapons, thus softening his categorical position on this issue. Mironov himself has six premium short-barreled pistols. He also opposes euthanasia.

He is a supporter of the introduction of the death penalty for pedophilia. He supported calls for the death penalty for those who perpetrated the Crocus City Hall attack.

=== Project "Do or Go!" ===
On 11 February 2016, Mironov announced the start of an all-Russian campaign to collect 10 million signatures under demands against the prime minister and ministers. Mironov's project provides for the resignation of the government if the following demands of the Russians are not met. Their list is replenished during the action in accordance with the proposals of citizens.

During the first day of the action, over 70,000 signatures were collected, by August 2016 - about 5 million. The first signature under the requirements within the framework of the project "Do or Go!" was put by himself Mironov.

Mironov's project was preceded by a successful action to collect a million signatures against payments for capital repairs until the state fulfilled its obligations to citizens.

== Environmental views ==
Mironov is a supporter of the experimental method of TNVR (Trap–neuter–vaccinate–return), legalizing the free presence of stray dogs in the urban environment. In November 2018, he initiated, together with deputy Vladimir Burmatov, a bill allowing the return of these animals to the streets of cities after sterilization. By decision of the Supreme Court of the Russian Federation in January 2017, the TNVR method was banned in the Rostov Oblast as not complying with the current legislation in the field of ensuring sanitary and epidemiological well-being of the population and prevention of contagious diseases, and in October 2018, the City Court of Saint Petersburg banned TNVR in this subject of the federation as well. The explanatory note to the bill states the need not to limit the regions in their authority to treat these animals, suggesting that they should be guided by humane considerations and not depend on the position of courts and veterinarians on this issue.

In July 2018, Mironov had already proposed a similar bill, according to which "all stray animals that have been sterilized and vaccinated should be released in the same place from which they were taken by specialists".

Mironov's initiative was criticized by cynologists, the head of the shelter "Four with a Tail" Diana Gordeeva noted that any dog is vaccinated against rabies once a year, and every stray dog will have to be searched for in industrial zones and heating mains, caught and vaccinated again, which is difficult in practice. At the same time, sterilized dogs will still have aggression towards humans and other animals, they will continue to fight for food and territory, and they will still be potentially dangerous.

For many years, he has denied the anthropogenic nature of ozone holes and global climate change, and believes that the signing of international climate agreements, in particular the "Kyoto Protocol" and the "Paris Agreement", serves only the economic interests of individual companies and countries.

== Personal life ==
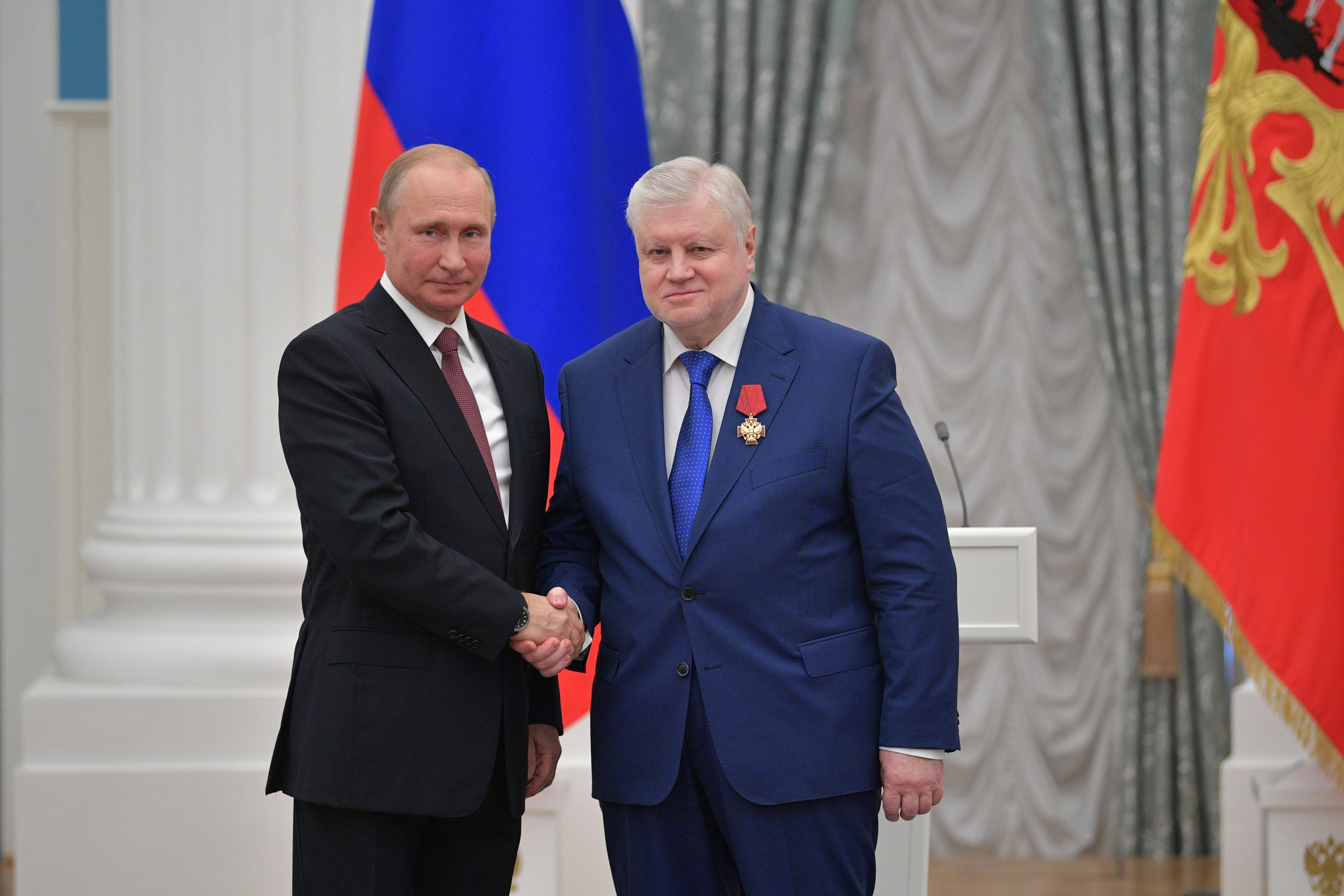
Mironov with Vladimir Putin on 27 June 2018

His third wife Irina Yurievna Mironova is an officer apparatus to the Interparliamentary Assembly of the CIS. They have a son and a daughter.

An investigation by BBC News found that in 2022 Mironov and his wife had adopted a 10 months old girl Marharyta Prokopenko that was abducted from Ukraine's town of Kherson by Inna Varlamova during Russian occupation to Moscow under the pretext of "medical examination". In Moscow, her birth certificate was falsified, changing her name to Maryna Mironova and birthplace to Russia.

In 2008, President Vladimir Putin awarded Mironov the Order "For Merit to the Fatherland", 3rd degree.

In 2011, after an initiative of United Russia in the Legislative Assembly of Saint Petersburg, Mironov was recalled from the Federation Council.

=== Wealth ===
According to The Insider in a report published in January 2022, Mironov's family owns an elite apartment in Moscow worth 350 million rubles, which is almost 70 times more than the politician's officially declared annual income. The apartment has an area of 235 square meters and is located in the residential complex "Park Palace" on Prechistenskaya embankment. Mironov's ex-wife Olga and their minor son live in it, and since 2015 its official owner has been Olga's brother, who could not buy such expensive real estate with his own money, since the annual revenue of his business is less than 14 million rubles.

== Electoral history ==
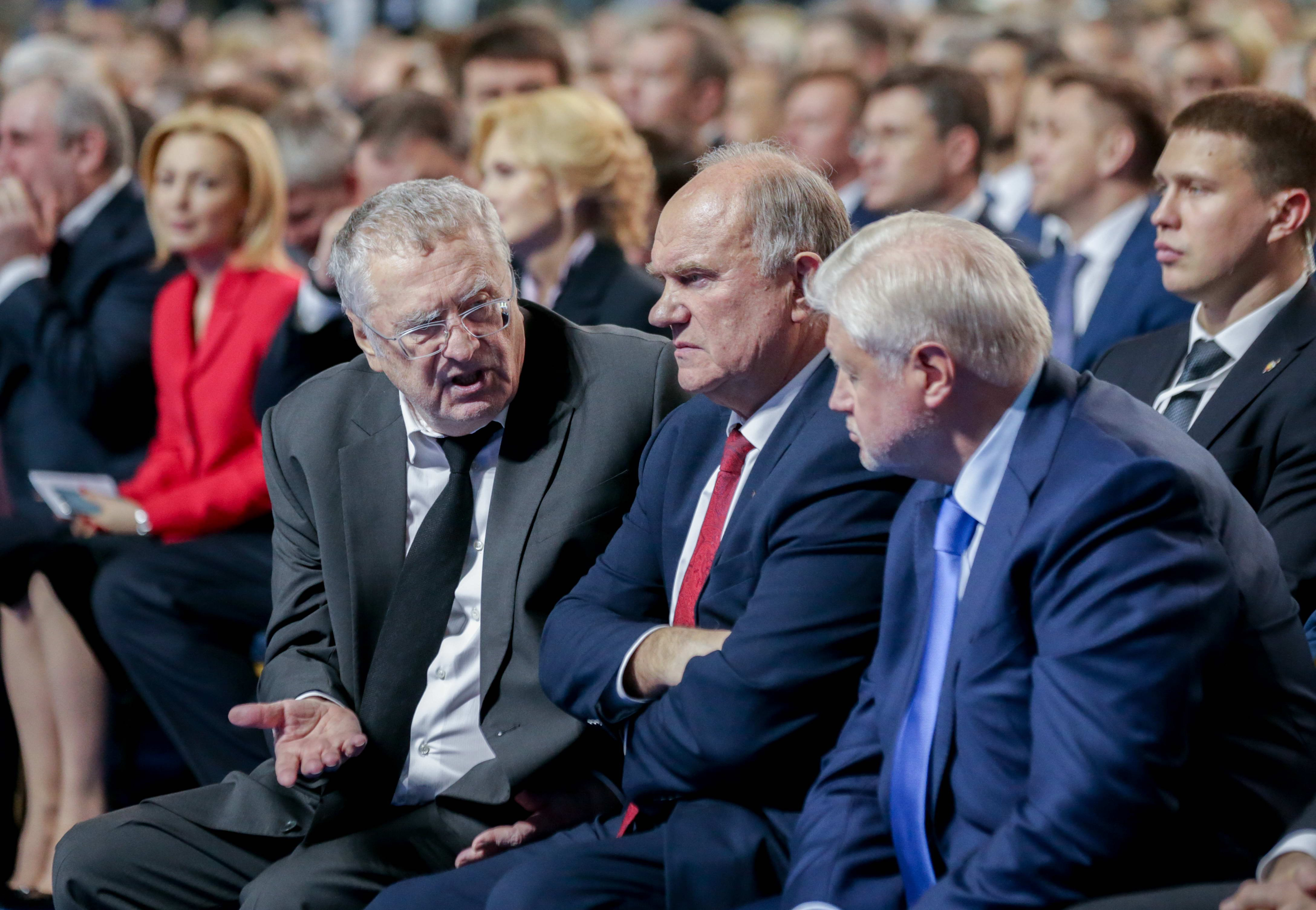
Mironov with Vladimir Zhirinovsky and Gennady Zyuganov on 20 February 2019

=== 2004 presidential campaign ===
Mironov ran for president in the 2004 presidential election as the nominee of the Russian Party of Life. His candidacy was seen largely as a ploy to lend credence to the contest, as he was widely known to be a strong supporter of Vladimir Putin. He was even quoted as declaring, "We all want Vladimir Putin to be the next president."

Mironov's campaign slogan was "Justice and Responsibility".

Most Russians were unfamiliar with Mironov and were disinterested in his candidacy.

=== 2012 presidential campaign ===
Running in 2012 as the A Just Russia nominee, Mironov called for a return to a socialist model of government. Mironov was nominated by his party on 10 December 2011.

While he stated that he predicted a Putin victory, he declared that he would support Gennady Zyuganov in a hypothetical runoff against Putin.

== Honours and awards ==
- Order of Merit for the Fatherland, 3rd class (14 February 2008) - for outstanding contribution to the strengthening and development of Russian statehood and parliamentarism
- Jubilee Medal "300 Years of the Russian Navy"
- Medal "In Commemoration of the 300th Anniversary of Saint Petersburg" (2003)
- Medal "In Commemoration of the 1000th Anniversary of Kazan" (2005)
- Medal "For military cooperation" (Ministry of Internal Affairs of Russia, 2005)
- Three times awarded personal firearms - Makarov, PMM and Vector pistols
