= Medvedev Doctrine =

2008 Russian foreign policy

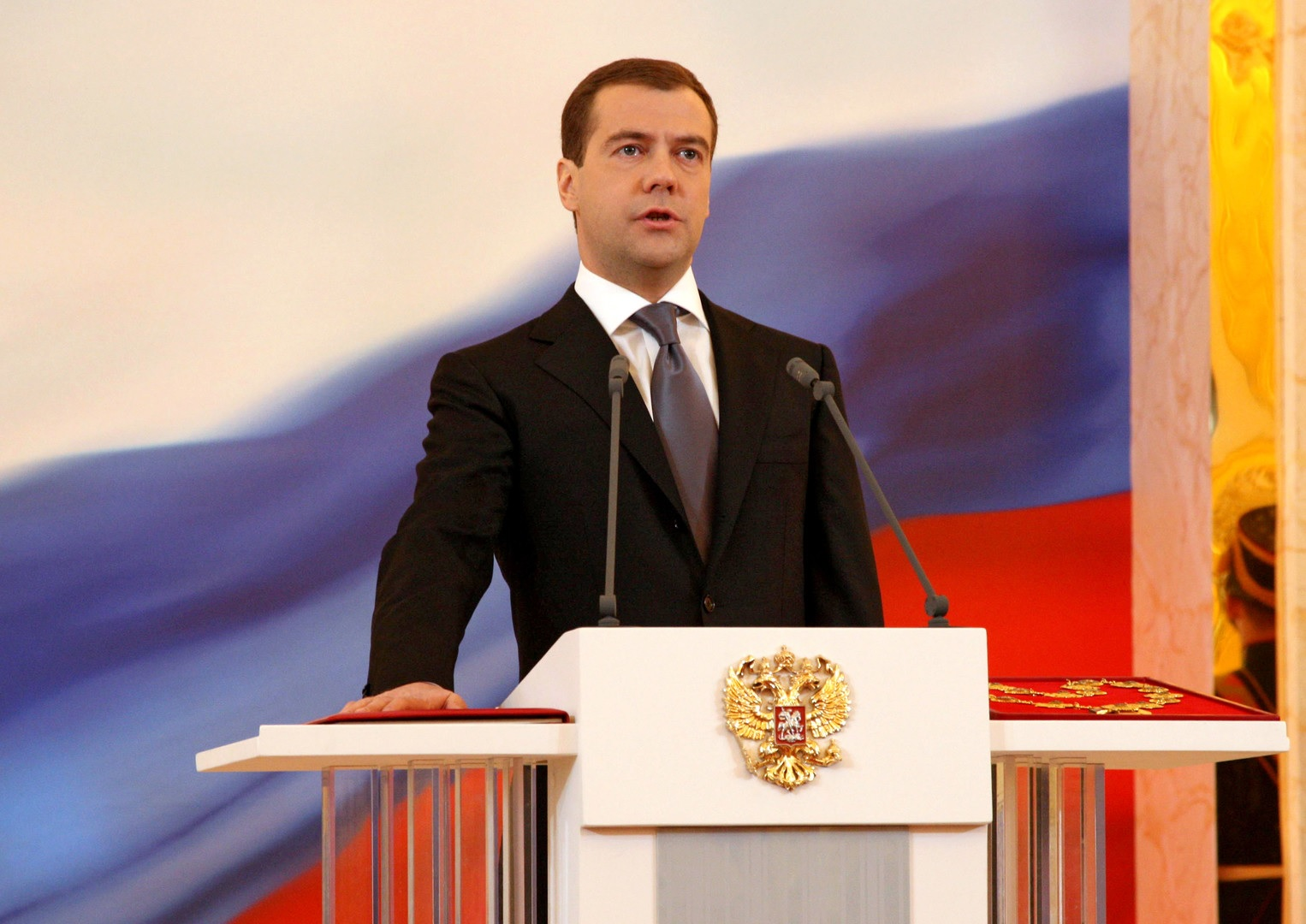
Dmitry Medvedev in 2008, during his inauguration as President of Russia

The Medvedev Doctrine is a set of five principles stated by President of Russia Dmitry Medvedev in an interview to Channel One Russia on Sunday August 31, 2008, in the aftermath of the Russo-Georgian War. They may be summarized as follows:

1. "Russia recognizes the primacy of the fundamental principles of international law"
2. "The world should be multi-polar"
3. "Russia does not want confrontation with any other country"
4. "Protecting the lives and dignity of our citizens, wherever they may be, is an unquestionable priority for our country"
5. "As is the case of other countries, there are regions in which Russia has privileged interests"

== Origin ==
The doctrine was officially announced in the wake of the Russo-Georgian war. The Russian intervention began on August 7, 2008 when Russian military forces crossed the border into Georgia in response to a Georgian attack on South Ossetia. The Russian government justified the invasion by claiming the citizens of South Ossetia & Abkhazia were Russian citizens and Georgia was involved in genocide and ethnic cleansing. The Medvedev doctrine therefore sought to enshrine the principles justifying their actions in Georgia while setting the stage for further actions intended to push back against the West.

== Criticism ==
The doctrine has been the subject of scrutiny and criticism. For example, the Atlantic Council found it hypocritical for Russia to reject the current world order and simultaneously respect it's judicial expression in international law. Furthermore, Russia's performance in the Russo-Georgian War brought into question whether or not Russia could actually uphold the Medvedev doctrine.
