= 2nd ASEAN–Russia Summit =

The Second Association of South East Asian Nations–Russia Summit is the second summit of ASEAN leaders and the leader from Russia. It was chaired by Vietnam on October 30, 2010.

== See also ==
  - 1st ASEAN Summit

== Background ==
The ASEAN–Russian summit is a political and economic organization of ten countries located in Southeast Asia, which was formed on August 8, 1967, by Indonesia, Malaysia, the Philippines, Singapore and Thailand. Since then, membership has expanded to include Brunei, Burma (Myanmar), Cambodia, Laos, and Vietnam. Its aims include the acceleration of economic growth, social progress, and cultural development among its members, the protection of the peace and stability of the region, and to provide opportunities for member countries to discuss differences peacefully.
