= Russian Party of Life =

Russian Party of Life Российская партия жизни
- Abbreviation: RPL (English); РПЖ (Russian)
- Leader: Sergey Mironov
- Founded: 29 June 2002; 24 years ago
- Dissolved: 28 October 2006; 19 years ago
- Merged into: A Just Russia
- Headquarters: Moscow, Russia
- Youth wing: Energy of Life
- Membership: 112,000
- Ideology: Economic liberalism Third Way; Russian nationalism
- Political position: Centre
- Colours: Red; Blue

Website
- rpvita.ru

The Russian Party of Life (RPL) (Note: Russian: Российская партия жизни (РПЖ), romanized: Rossijskaja partija žizni (RPŽ), IPA: [rɐˈsʲijskəjə ˈpartʲɪjə ˈʐɨzʲnʲɪ (ˌɛrˌpɛˈʐɛ)]) was a political party in Russia, led by Sergey Mironov (Speaker of the Federation Council, the upper house of the Russian parliament). According to its website, the party was liberal on economic issues and nationalistic on everything else. Its headquarters were located in Moscow.

In the legislative elections on 7 December 2003, the alliance of the Party of Russia's Rebirth and the Russian Party of Life party won only 1.9% of the popular vote and no seats, despite attracting to its list a number of Russian celebrities, most famously Oxana Fedorova.

The Russian Party of Life merged with Rodina and the Russian Pensioners' Party into a new party, A Just Russia, on 28 October 2006.

== History ==
Candidate of Historical Sciences Ye. S. Volk noted:

Under the auspices of the Speaker of the Federation Council Sergey Mironov, the third person in the state, a congress of the Party of Life took place. Its creation was welcomed by President Vladimir Putin himself. So far, neither the program nor the ideology of the new political association has been clearly defined, and therefore its prospects are quite vague. Moreover, the one party in power—United Russia—is already functioning successfully. But if, for some reason, the Kremlin changes its mind about supporting the existing center-left party and decides to rely on the Party of Life, then it will not be difficult to "promote" it...

=== Dissolution ===
In July 2006, Sergey Mironov, at a joint press conference with the new leader of the Rodina party, Alexander Babakov, announced their intention to unite their parties. Mironov and Babakov declared their readiness to unite under their wing all left forces – except the Communist Party of the Russian Federation – and thus enter the State Duma, becoming one of the system parties along with United Russia. Speaking at the press conference, both Babakov and Mironov did not hide that the main opponent of the new party would be United Russia as "a party of political monopoly, a bureaucracy without borders, a path to nowhere."

On 10 October, Interfax hosted a press conference of the leaders of three political parties: the leader of the Party of Life, Sergey Mironov; the leader of the Rodina party, Alexander Babakov; and the leader of the Pensioners Party, Igor Zotov. At the conference, it was announced that the three parties had united into a new party, A Just Russia, and that the Party of Life had been transformed into the social movement "Russian Charter of Life."

On 23 October, the newly-elected chairman of the Samara regional branch, Viktor Tarkhov, was elected mayor of the city in the elections of the head of the city of Samara, becoming the first party candidate to be elected head of a city, ahead of the candidate from United Russia.

It was assumed that the new united party would become the new party of power.
