= Medvedev modernisation programme =

2009 Russian modernisation programme

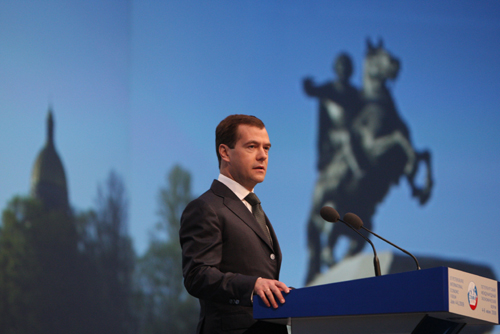
Dmitry Medvedev addressing to the St. Petersburg International Economic Forum in 2009

The Medvedev modernisation programme was an initiative launched by President of Russia Dmitry Medvedev in 2009, which aimed at modernising Russia's economy and society, decreasing the country's dependency on oil and gas revenues and creating a diversified economy based on high technology and innovation. The programme was based on the top 5 priorities for the country's technological development: efficient energy use; nuclear technology; information technology; medical technology and pharmaceuticals; and space technology in combination with telecommunications.

== Announcement ==
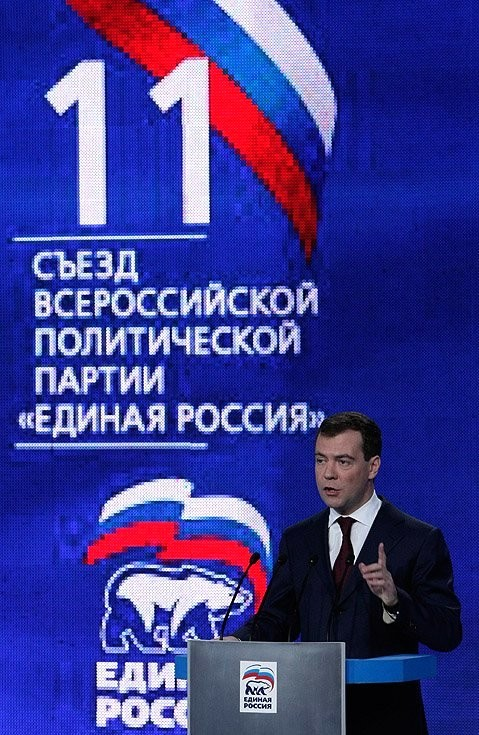
Medvedev making a speech at the 11th United Russia Party Congress on 21 November 2009, after the publication of Go Russia! and its discussion in the Russian media

=== Background ===
After the near total collapse in 1998, the Russian economy recovered as a result of high oil prices during the presidency of Vladimir Putin, but remained heavily dependent on energy and raw material exports. In the first decade of the 2000s, global oil prices kept rising, fuelling economic growth. Medvedev later stated his belief that this was not only a boom, but also damaging to the Russian economy, saying that if the oil price is too high, "we’d never change the structure of our economy... We haven’t done anything in the last 10 years because oil kept rushing higher and higher."

There had been repeated calls for a more diversified economy under Putin; already in 2005, Putin's Prime Minister Mikhail Fradkov warned about the dependency of the economy on raw material exports, and in 2007 Deputy Prime Minister Sergey Ivanov said that without diversification, the Russian economy will sooner or later face a collapse. Dmitry Medvedev, elected as president in 2008, made economic modernisation his prime presidential agenda. Medvedev's statements regarding this issue went much further than other statements by the Russian leadership. In 2009, Medvedev founded the Presidential Commission on Innovation. The commission comprises almost the entire Russian government and some of the best minds from academia and business.

=== "Go Russia!" ===
Medvedev outlined his programme in an article called "Go Russia!" that was published online in September 2009. In the article, he formulated his strategic objective of modernising Russia. He criticised Russia's economic "backwardness" and what he called Russia's "humiliating" dependency on oil and raw materials. He described the Russian society as "archaic" and "paternalistic" and said that the country can no longer rely on the achievements of the past to secure a prosperous future. In Medvedev's view, Russia should aim for a modern, diversified economy based on high technology and innovation. Medvedev criticised the previous attempts to modernise Russia—those initiated by Peter I the Great and the Soviet Union—saying that the results they brought came at too high a cost, and this time modernisation must come not through coercion but via the development of the creative potential of every individual, through private entrepreneurship and initiative.

Medvedev identified five key areas for economic modernisation, in which breakthroughs must be achieved:

- Energy efficiency and new fuels
- Medical technologies and pharmaceuticals
- Nuclear power engineering
- Information technologies
- Space and telecommunications

Medvedev further discussed and publicised his programme in his second state of the nation address in November 2009, as well as in a televised speech in December 2009.

== Programme structure ==
=== Efficient use of energy and resources ===
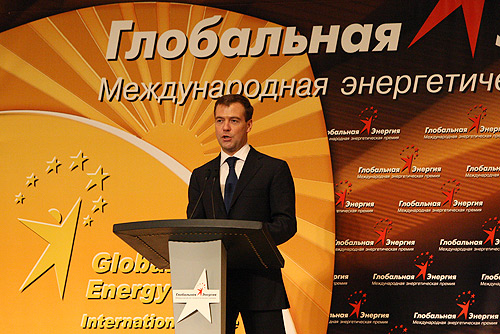
Dmitry Medvedev at the 2008 International Global Energy Prize award ceremony

As of 2014, the energy intensity of the Russian economy was estimated to be about 2.5 times more than the world average. The government set an aim of 40% decrease of the energy intensity by 2020. It was estimated that the main potential of achieving this aim lies within the housing sector and the budget organisations. The following state projects were initiated to increase energy efficiency:

State projects
English	Russian	Details
Count, save and pay	Считай, экономь и плати	establishing and propagation of the thrifty model of energy resources use; governmental coordination of mass installation and production of counters and economizers.
New light	Новый свет	gradual replacement of traditional incandescent light bulbs with more efficient types of lamps; development of the national production of energy saving devices.
Energetically efficient city block	Энергоэффективный квартал	pilot project aimed to create efficient energy distribution and saving systems in urban blocks of several Russian cities.
Energetically efficient social sector	Энергоэффективный социальный сектор	realisation of the energy efficiency programmes in schools and hospitals, with planned subsequent enlargement of the project scope to all social services.
Local energy systems	Малая комплексная энергетика	developing of the local systems of electricity generation and central heating, where such small-scale systems were thought to be more effective than large, centralized systems; development of the production of equipment for local energy generation and supply.
Innovative energy supply	Инновационная энергетика	stimulation of new innovative developments in energy sector; nationwide technological contests in the area of energy efficiency.

=== Nuclear technology ===
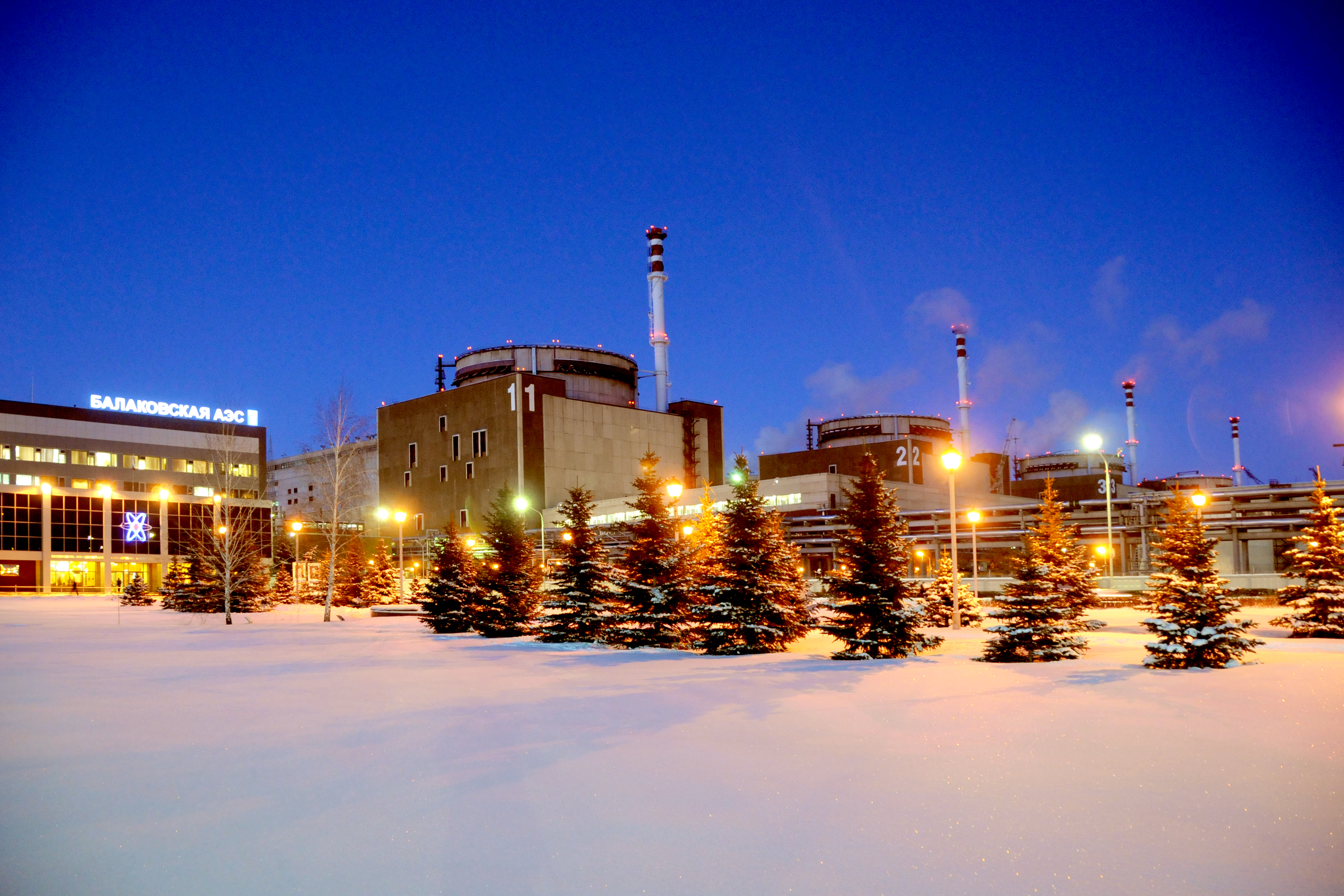
Balakovo Nuclear Power Plant, one of the largest in Russia

Nuclear power in Russia is managed by Rosatom State Corporation. The aim of the programme was to increase the total share of nuclear energy from 16.9% to 23% by 2020. It was planned to allocate 127 billion rubles ($5.42 billion) to a federal program dedicated to the next generation of nuclear energy technology. About 1 trillion rubles ($42.7 billion) was to be allocated from the federal budget to nuclear power and industry development before 2015. The programme aimed to establish secure, cheap, and long-term nuclear energy supply in Russia as well as increase Russian exports of nuclear energy and technology abroad. Besides construction of the new nuclear power plants in Russia and elsewhere, the following major state projects were initiated in the area of nuclear technology:

State Projects
English	Russian	Details
Development of the Standard Project of the optimised and informatised powerblock based on the VVER technology (VVER-TOI)	Создание Типового Проекта оптимизированного и информатизированного энергоблока технологии ВВЭР (ВВЭР-ТОИ)	development by 2012 of all the technology needed for a modern nuclear power station with the VVER-type reactor, adapted for Russian as well as for American and European markets.
New technological platform: closed nuclear fuel cycle and fast-neutron reactors	Новая технологическая платформа: замкнутый ядерный топливный цикл и реакторы на быстрых нейтронах	development by 2030 of a new technological base in nuclear technology, characterised by the usage of closed nuclear fuel cycle and fast-neutron reactors. This technology allows better efficiency of nuclear fuel usage, an important advantage in light of the expected future squeeze in the world's uranium supply. Russia is a world leader in fast-neutron reactor technology.
Controlled thermonuclear fusion	Управляемый термоядерный синтез	development by 2050 of practical methods of controlled thermonuclear fusion, the technology aimed to produce cheap energy fully independent from non-renewable resources.

=== Information technology ===
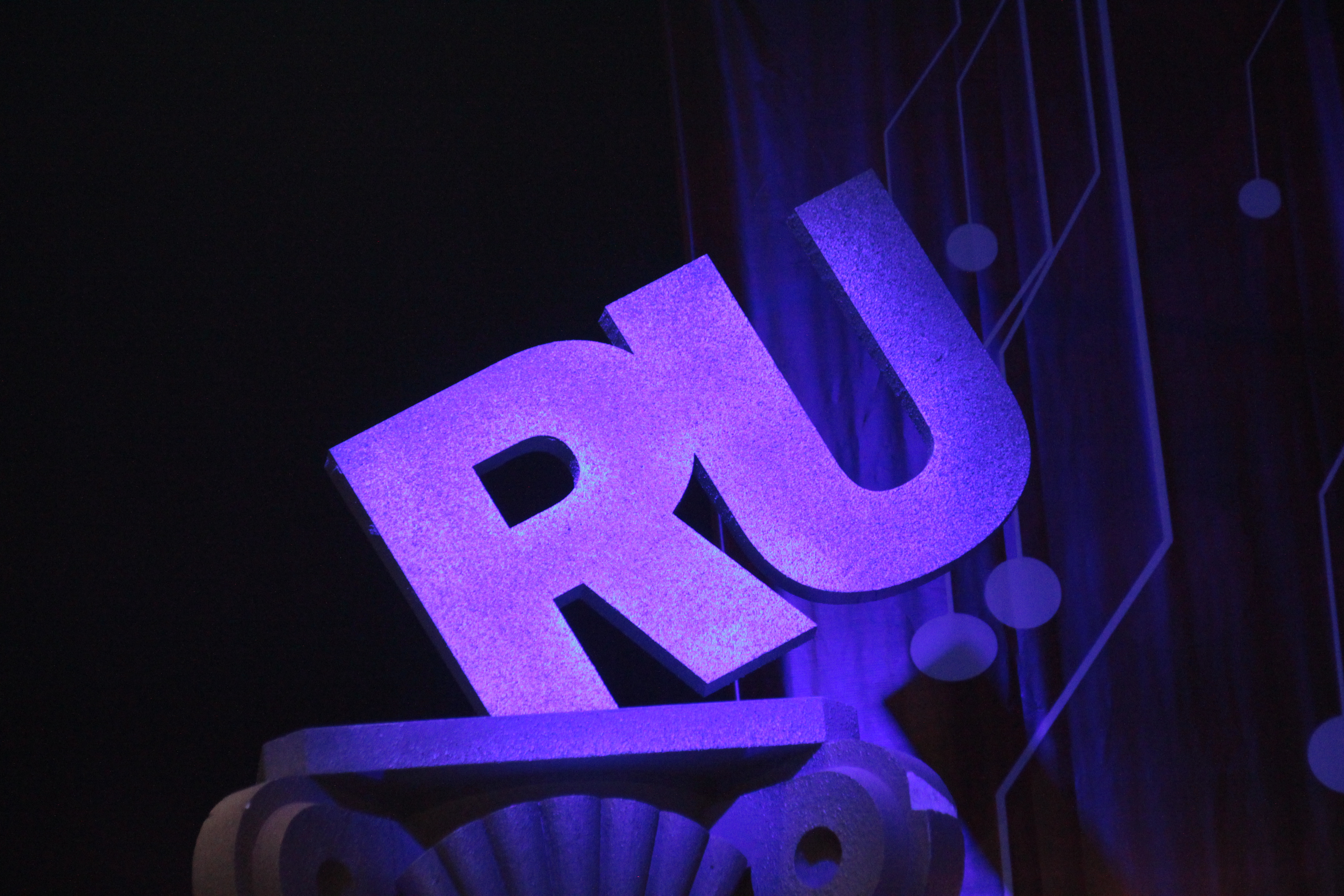
Runet logo at the 2009 Runet Prize ceremony

The government planned to develop the information society in Russia and counter a shortage of IT specialists due to high demand. In 2009 Russian companies employed more than 1 million IT specialists, making up 1.34% of the country's workforce, a figure lower than in other major economies such as the United States (3.74%), United Kingdom (3.16%), and Germany (3.14%).

The following major state projects were realized or planned in the area of information technology:

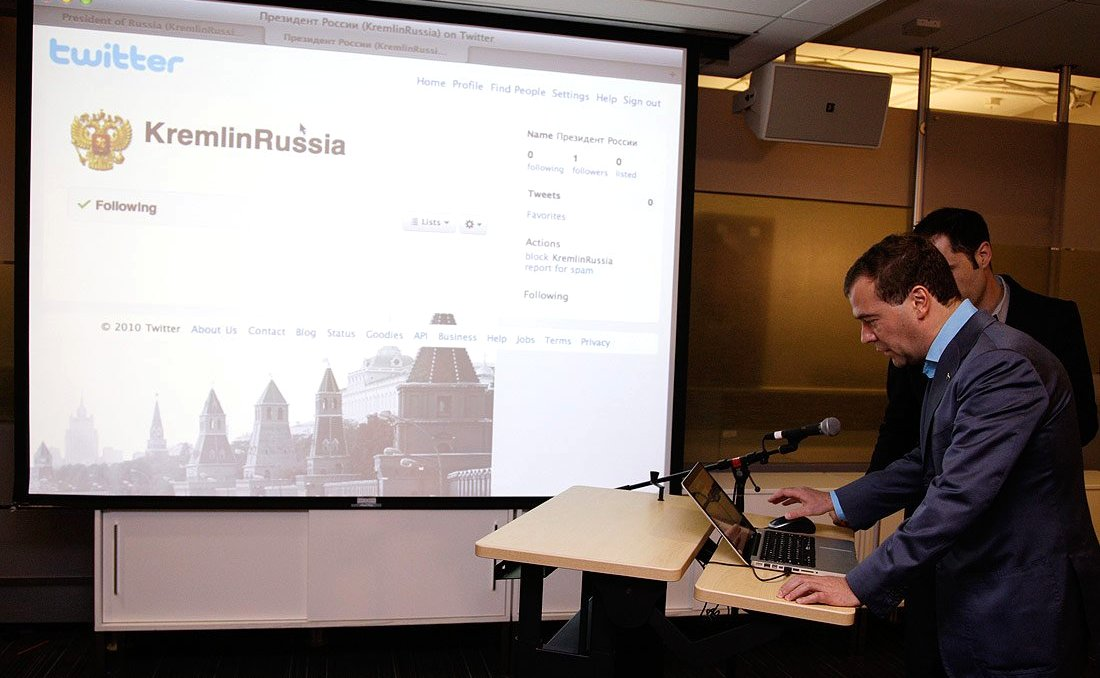
Dmitry Medvedev posts on Twitter.

State projects
English	Russian	Details
Development of supercomputing and grid technology	Развитие суперкомпьютеров и ГРИД-технологий	creation of the common space for the domestically produced high-performance supercomputers on the basis of grid computing, in order to provide means for the complex calculations for nuclear technology centers, aircraft industry and other major clients which need high-performance computing for computer simulation of their projects.
Electronic government	Электронное правительство	gradual movement towards the e-government, which includes the providing of interaction with the state and access to the state services via Internet and other communication technologies; reducing the volume of paper documentation in favour of electronic one (first in the pilot regions, then on the state level); full transfer to the public announcement of the government procurement orders in electronic form.
IT and communication services in education and social development	ИКТ-услуги в области развития образования и социального развития личности	creation and development of the new e-learning Internet resources aimed into improving the access to higher and professional education, especially for people with disabilities, inhabitants of remote regions of the country, and Russian speakers outside of Russia; establishment of the special centers for the education of specialists in IT and the involvement of gifted secondary and higher education students into IT development.
IT and communication services in medical science, health care and social security	ИКТ-услуги в области медицины, здравоохранения и социального обеспечения	creation and development of the Internet resources and automatic systems aimed into providing quality state services in public health and social security; IT-based monitoring of the personal health of citizens; development of systems that improve the interaction between medical scientists and physicians; transfer of medical records into the electronic form and introduction of the similar electronic "social cards".
IT and communication services in public and personal security	ИКТ-услуги в области безопасности жизнедеятельности	development of systems of automatic speech recognition, closed-circuit television and security-related pattern recognition.
Supercomputer education	Суперкомпьютерное образование	creation of the national system of education of specialists in supercomputing on the basis of Supercomputer Consortium of Russian universities; 500 experts in supercomputing were planned to be prepared in 2010–2012, and 25 universities were expected to join the system of supercomputer education.

=== Space technology and telecommunications ===
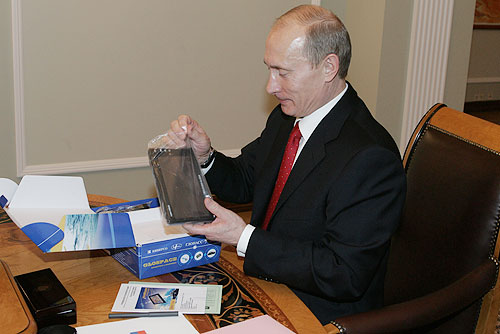
Vladimir Putin with GLONASS navigator

Much of the sector area still awaited large-scale commercialisation,. aimed to be achieved by the combination of space technology and telecommunications. The following state projects were initiated in this area:

State projects
English	Russian	Details
Space-based navigation, including the commercialisation of the GLONASS system	Космическая навигация, включая коммерческое использование системы ГЛОНАСС	providing the satellite navigation services of Russian GLONASS system to various type of clients, including emergency services, construction and freight companies, natural gas and petroleum industry, energy supply and logistics, and individual customers.
Space-based monitoring and search	Мониторинг и слежение из космоса	distant space-based monitoring of the Earth atmosphere and surface, aimed into the search of mineral resources, ecological control, climate change and weather forecasting, and rescue operations support.
Space-based targeting systems	Системы наведения из космоса	implementation of the capabilities of military and anti-terrorist space-based targeting systems into the area of dealing with certain types of emergencies, control of the atmospheric processes etc.
Space-based telecommunications in the broadband access systems	Космические телекоммуникации, как часть системы широкополосного доступа	transfer to the space-based broadband access systems, including in the area of digital television and radio.

The funding of Russian Federal Space Agency Roscosmos has almost tripled from 2007, standing at $3.1 billion in 2011. President Medvedev and the modernisation programme is credited with the increase.

=== Medical technology and pharmaceuticals ===
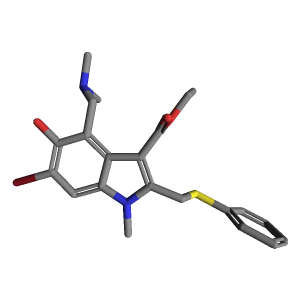
3D model of Arbidol molecule, a Russian antiviral treatment for influenza, popular in Russia and China

Despite a number of achievements, Russia was significantly behind the world leaders in medical technology and pharmaceutical production. The country produced only 20% of the drugs used domestically, while 80% is imported.

The specific major state projects in the area of medical technology and pharmaceuticals were not defined or announced. The government aimed to achieve the primarily domestical production of the most needed types of medical equipment and pharmaceuticals, as well as support the development and commercialization of new innovative products, especially those related to biotechnology, cell and nuclear medicine, and nanotechnology.

== See also ==
- Timeline of largest projects in the Russian economy
